= Ji So-yun =

South Korean footballer (born 1991)

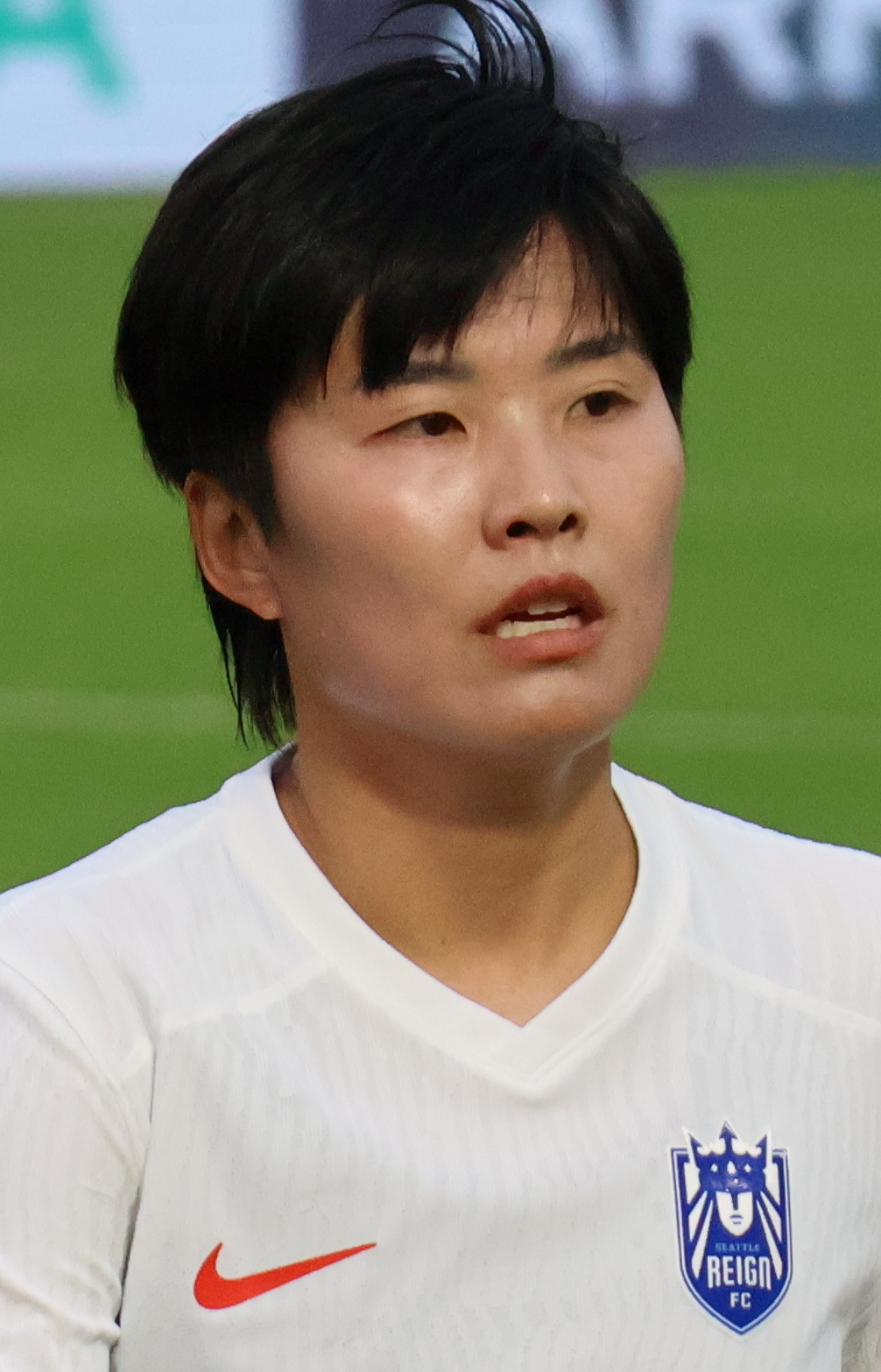
- Ji with Seattle Reign FC in 2024

Personal information
- Date of birth: 21 February 1991 (age 35)
- Place of birth: Seoul, South Korea
- Height: 1.60 m (5 ft 3 in)
- Position: Midfielder

Team information
- Current team: Suwon FC
- Number: 10

Youth career
- 2006–2008: Dongsan Information Industry High School

College career
Years	Team	Apps	(Gls)
2009–2010	Hanyang Women's University		

Senior career*
Years	Team	Apps	(Gls)
2011–2013	INAC Kobe Leonessa	48	(21)
2014–2022	Chelsea	124	(37)
2022–2024	Suwon FC	23	(8)
2024–2025	Seattle Reign FC	39	(5)
2025	→ Birmingham City (loan)	10	(1)
2026–	Suwon FC	26	(6)

International career^{‡}
2007–2008	South Korea U17	15	(11)
2007–2010	South Korea U20	17	(13)
2009	South Korea Universiade	4	(0)
2006–	South Korea	182	(76)
Medal record
Women's football
Representing South Korea
FIFA U-20 Women's World Cup
Bronze medal – third place	2010 Germany
Summer Universiade
Gold medal – first place	2009 Belgrade
AFC Women's Asian Cup
Runner-up	2022 India
Asian Games
Bronze medal – third place	2010 Guangzhou
Bronze medal – third place	2014 Incheon
Bronze medal – third place	2018 Jakarta–Palembang
Bronze medal – third place	2026 Aichi–Nagoya
AFC U-19 Women's Championship
Runner-up	2009 China
EAFF Championship
Winner	2025 South Korea
Bronze medal – third place	2010 Japan
Bronze medal – third place	2013 South Korea
Bronze medal – third place	2022 Japan
- * Club domestic league appearances and goals as of 9 November 2026 ‡ National team caps and goals as of 2 October 2026

- Ji So-yun
- Hangul: 지소연
- Hanja: 池笑然
- RR: Ji Soyeon
- MR: Chi Soyŏn

Ji So-yun (Korean: 지소연, Korean pronunciation: [tɕi.so.jʌn]; born 21 February 1991) is a South Korean professional footballer who plays as a midfielder for WK League club Suwon FC and the South Korea national team. She is South Korea's all-time top goalscorer, with 76 goals.

== Early life ==
Ji grew up in Imun-dong, Seoul, where she lived in government-subsidised housing with her mother, Kim Ae-ri, and younger brother. Her parents divorced when she was in elementary school. Ji's mother was diagnosed with cervical cancer for which she underwent surgery in 2002, and has also received treatment for ovarian tumours and chronic pain, which forced her to give up work. As a result the family received government benefits and struggled financially. When Ji's family background later became publicly known, she received grants from Dongdaemun Police Station and Dongdaemun District Office. Ji's parents, particularly her father, initially objected to her pursuing a career in football. However, she was encouraged to play by the owner of a local bunsik shop.

As a middle schooler, Ji was involved in a fight in which her school's players physically assaulted girls from a rival football team. Ji's family was one of several which had to pay compensation. Her mother has cited this incident as a turning point for Ji, who became determined to support her family through playing football rather than adding to their financial burdens.

== Youth career ==
In 1998, when Ji was in the second grade at Imun Elementary School, she caught the attention of coach Kim Kwang-yeol, who suggested she join the football academy at the school. Kim had thought she was a boy and only realised she was a girl when he saw her resident registration number on the application form, but considered it a waste of Ji's talent if she were unable to play, so invited her to play for the boys' team anyway. Ji was the only girl on the team. She appeared in the television show Let's Go! Dream Team that saw elementary schoolers take on professional football players in a penalty shoot-out. Even as a fifth grader, she was regularly included in Imun's starting XI alongside older boys, and coaches considered her to be several years ahead of her male peers, none of whom went on to play football professionally.

After graduating from elementary school, Ji finally had the opportunity to play for an elite girls' team as she attended Oju Middle School in Seoul's Songpa District, where Choi In-cheol was the girls' football coach. She soon earned a reputation as the best emerging talent in South Korean women's football, playing a key role for Oju as the team won nine domestic tournaments in a row, and achieved a record 60-match unbeaten streak.

Choi In-cheol left Oju in 2004 to manage the girls' football team at Dongsan Information Industry High School, and upon graduating from middle school Ji followed him there in 2006. The same year, Ji became a household name as the youngest football player ever to represent South Korea at senior level. Following her breakout performances at international level, she was shortlisted for AFC Women's Youth Player of the Year in 2007.

Ji was a star player for her high school team, scoring goals in important matches including the final of the 2008 Spring Championship, in which Dongsan beat Hyundai High School 3–0. She scored four of Dongsan's goals in the final of the 2008 Chunghakgi National Girls' Football Festival, which saw the team beat Incheon Design High School 7–1. In the same year she became the first woman to play in a charity match annually held for children with cancer and teenage breadwinners by Hong Myung-bo. As she reached the end of her high school career, Ji considered going directly into works football but decided to go to college to continue developing as a player before signing with a club. She had received interest from several clubs but Choi In-cheol encouraged her to go to college, partly to protect her from the controversy and media attention that had surrounded Park Eun-sun when she signed with Seoul City directly from high school a few years earlier.

== Club career ==
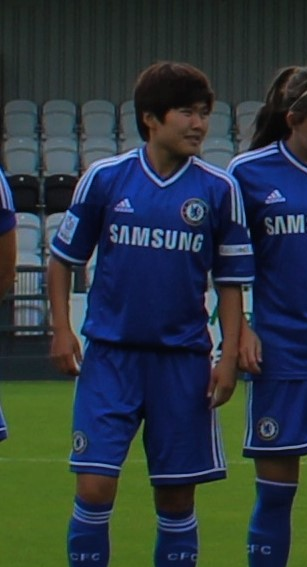
Ji with Chelsea in 2014

Ji had long hoped to play in the United States but considering a potential move too risky, she decided to sign a contract with Nadeshiko League side INAC Kobe Leonessa, initially joining the club for one year. Ji played for INAC Kobe for three years, making 48 appearances and scoring 21 goals in total, helping the side to win three consecutive Nadeshiko League titles. She was named in the league's Best XI in 2012 and 2013.

In November 2013, Ji was subject to a transfer bid from English club Chelsea. She agreed to a two-year contract in January 2014. When the transfer was officially confirmed later that month, Chelsea manager Emma Hayes said of Ji: "She is one of the best midfielders in the world and our fans will love her." In one of her final matches for the Japanese club, Ji scored against her soon-to-be new club, Chelsea, in the International Women's Club Championship final.

Ji was named Players' Player of the Year after her first season in England, as Chelsea narrowly missed out on the FA WSL 1 title on the last day of the season. She was named PFA Women's Players' Player of the Year in April 2015 and was also named in the PFA WSL Team of the Year.

In the 2015 FA Women's Cup final, staged at Wembley Stadium for the first time, Ji scored the only goal of the match to win the cup for Chelsea. In October 2015 she also scored in Chelsea's 4–0 win over Sunderland which secured the club's first FA WSL 1 title and a league and cup double.

Ji made her 100th appearance for Chelsea in a 1–1 draw against Arsenal on 1 April 2018 in the middle of the 2017–18 season. She once again contributed to her club's double, as well as helped them advance to the semi-finals of the UEFA Women's Champions League in that season.

On 29 August 2020, Ji led Chelsea to a 2–0 win over Manchester City by performing the role of the key playmaker in the Women's FA Community Shield, held for the first time since 2008. She was named the Player of the Match by BBC, which broadcast the match. At the end of 2020, she was on the list of eleven nominees for The Best FIFA Women's Player award alongside her teammates Pernille Harder and Sam Kerr. In the light of her performances for Chelsea over the years and the instrumental role she played in Chelsea's 2020–21 FA WSL winning team, Suzanne Wrack of The Guardian claimed that Ji was the best foreign player in the history of WSL. Chelsea won all domestic cups in addition to the league title during the season, achieving a quadruple.

After spending eight years with Chelsea, Ji left the club following the 2021–22 season. She made over 200 appearances and scored 68 goals in all competitions, and won six league titles, four FA Cups, two league cups, and one Community Shield.

On 24 May 2022, Ji returned to her homeland and joined WK League side Suwon FC, her first spell with a South Korean club. On her WK League debut on 18 August 2022, she scored a brace in a 3–0 victory against Boeun Sangmu. She had helped Suwon advance to the final at the 2023 WK League, and scored two goals in a 3–1 first leg win over Incheon Hyundai Steel Red Angels. Despite her effort, her club lost 7–5 on aggregate after the second leg.

On 24 January 2024, the National Women's Soccer League club Seattle Reign FC announced that they had signed Ji on a two-year contract through the 2025 season.

After spending two seasons with the Reign, including a loan spell at Women's Super League 2 club Birmingham City, Ji rejoined her former club Suwon FC in January 2026. During the 2025–26 AFC Women's Champions League, she scored the opener in the 4–0 quarter-final win over Wuhan Jianghan University, but missed a penalty in the 2–1 semi-final loss to North Korean club Naegohyang.

== International career ==
Ji represented South Korea at senior level before appearing at youth level. In October 2006, she made her senior team debut while playing at the 2006 Peace Queen Cup. On 30 November 2006, she became the youngest goalscorer (15 years, 282 days) for the South Korean senior team after scoring two goals against Chinese Taipei at the 2006 Asian Games.

Ji played for the South Korea under-17s at the 2007 AFC U-16 Women's Championship and the 2008 FIFA U-17 Women's World Cup. She scored two goals in four matches at the U-17 World Cup.

Ji participated in the 2009 Summer Universiade when attending Hanyang Women's University. She won a gold medal and the Most Valuable Player award at the tournament.

While Ji was part of the national under-20 team, South Korea finished second at the 2009 AFC U-19 Women's Championship and third at the 2010 FIFA U-20 Women's World Cup. She showed her goal scoring ability at both tournaments, becoming the top goalscorer at the AFC U-19 Championship and the second top goalscorer at the U-20 World Cup, ultimately winning the Silver Ball and the Silver Shoe awards at the U-20 World Cup.

On 13 June 2015, Ji scored her first World Cup goal with a penalty kick in a Group E match against Costa Rica at the 2015 FIFA Women's World Cup. After finishing as runners-up in Group E, South Korea reached the World Cup knockout stages for the first time.

Ahead of the 2022 AFC Women's Asian Cup final, Ji had scored four goals in the competition, including a crucial goal in a 1–0 win over Australia in the quarter-finals. She also scored a penalty that gave South Korea a 2–0 lead at half-time in the final against China. South Korea came close to winning their first major women's football title, but the final ended in a 3–2 defeat after conceding three goals in the second half.

== Career statistics ==
=== Club ===
As of match played 31 March 2025

Appearances and goals by club, season and competition
Club	Season	League			National cup (Note: Includes Empress's Cup, Women's FA Cup)		League cup (Note: Includes Nadeshiko League Cup, FA Women's League Cup (FA WSL Cup))		Continental (Note: Includes UEFA Women's Champions League)		Other		Total	
Club	Season	Division	Apps	Goals	Apps	Goals	Apps	Goals	Apps	Goals	Apps	Goals	Apps	Goals
INAC Kobe Leonessa	2011	Nadeshiko League	16	8	4	0	—		—		—		20	8
INAC Kobe Leonessa	2012	Nadeshiko League	16	4	3	0	6	3	—		—		25	7
INAC Kobe Leonessa	2013	Nadeshiko League	16	9	4	6	9	3	—		2 (Note: Appearances in International Women's Club Championship)	1	31	19
INAC Kobe Leonessa	Total		48	21	11	6	15	6	—		2	1	76	34
Chelsea	2014	FA WSL 1	12	3	2	2	5	4	—		—		19	9
Chelsea	2015	FA WSL 1	14	5	4	3	4	2	4	0	—		26	10
Chelsea	2016	FA WSL 1	16	5	4	5	1	0	2	0	—		23	10
Chelsea	2017	FA WSL 1	7	4	3	2	—		—		—		10	6
Chelsea	2017–18	FA WSL 1	14	6	3	2	5	1	6	3	—		28	12
Chelsea	2018–19	Women's Super League	17	6	3	1	2	0	8	2	—		30	9
Chelsea	2019–20	Women's Super League	13	6	2	0	4	1	—		—		19	7
Chelsea	2020–21	Women's Super League	19	2	1	0	4	0	8	1	1 (Note: Appearance in Women's FA Community Shield)	0	33	3
Chelsea	2021–22	Women's Super League	12	0	4	2	1	0	5	0	—		22	2
Chelsea	Total		124	37	26	17	26	8	33	6	1	0	210	68
Suwon FC	2022	WK League	5	5	—		—		—		1 (Note: Appearances in WK League play-offs)	1	6	6
Suwon FC	2023	WK League	18	3	—		—		—		3	2	21	5
Suwon FC	Total		23	8	—		—		—		4	3	27	11
Seattle Reign FC	2024	National Women's Soccer League	26	3	—		—		—		2 (Note: Appearances in NWSL x Liga MX Femenil Summer Cup)	0	28	3
Seattle Reign FC	2025	National Women's Soccer League	3	1	—		—		—		—		3	1
Seattle Reign FC	Total		29	4	—		—		—		2	0	31	4
Career total			224	70	37	23	41	14	33	6	9	4	344	117

=== International ===
Scores and results list South Korea's goal tally first, score column indicates score after each Ji goal.

List of international goals scored by Ji So-yun
No.	Date	Venue	Opponent	Score	Result	Competition
1	30 November 2006	Doha, Qatar	Chinese Taipei	1–0	2–0	2006 Asian Games
2	30 November 2006	Doha, Qatar	Chinese Taipei	2–0	2–0	2006 Asian Games
3	17 February 2007	Masan, South Korea	India	1–0	5–0	2008 Summer Olympics qualification
4	15 April 2007	Hai Phong, Vietnam	Vietnam	1–1	2–1	2008 Summer Olympics qualification
5	15 April 2007	Hai Phong, Vietnam	Vietnam	2–1	2–1	2008 Summer Olympics qualification
6	12 August 2007	Cheongju, South Korea	Vietnam	1–0	2–1	2008 Summer Olympics qualification
7	26 August 2009	Tainan, Taiwan	Northern Mariana Islands	1–0	19–0	2010 EAFF Women's Championship qualification
8	26 August 2009	Tainan, Taiwan	Northern Mariana Islands	11–0	19–0	2010 EAFF Women's Championship qualification
9	26 August 2009	Tainan, Taiwan	Northern Mariana Islands	12–0	19–0	2010 EAFF Women's Championship qualification
10	26 August 2009	Tainan, Taiwan	Northern Mariana Islands	16–0	19–0	2010 EAFF Women's Championship qualification
11	26 August 2009	Tainan, Taiwan	Northern Mariana Islands	19–0	19–0	2010 EAFF Women's Championship qualification
12	30 August 2009	Tainan, Taiwan	Chinese Taipei	5–0	6–0	2010 EAFF Women's Championship qualification
13	10 February 2010	Tokyo, Japan	China	1–2	1–2	2010 EAFF Women's Championship
14	14 November 2010	Guangzhou, China	Vietnam	1–1	6–1	2010 Asian Games
15	16 November 2010	Guangzhou, China	Jordan	1–0	5–0	2010 Asian Games
16	16 November 2010	Guangzhou, China	Jordan	2–0	5–0	2010 Asian Games
17	16 November 2010	Guangzhou, China	Jordan	5–0	5–0	2010 Asian Games
18	22 November 2010	Guangzhou, China	China	2–0	2–0	2010 Asian Games
19	7 March 2011	Paralimni, Cyprus	Russia	1–0	2–1	2011 Cyprus Women's Cup
20	18 June 2011	Ehime, Japan	Japan	1–1	1–1	Friendly
21	3 September 2011	Jinan, China	Japan	1–1	1–2	2012 Summer Olympics qualification
22	14 January 2013	Chongqing, China	Canada	2–0	3–1	Friendly
23	6 March 2013	Paralimni, Cyprus	South Africa	1–0	2–0	2013 Cyprus Women's Cup
24	8 March 2013	Paralimni, Cyprus	Northern Ireland	1–0	3–0	2013 Cyprus Women's Cup
25	27 July 2013	Seoul, South Korea	Japan	1–0	2–1	2013 EAFF Women's East Asian Cup
26	27 July 2013	Seoul, South Korea	Japan	2–0	2–1	2013 EAFF Women's East Asian Cup
27	5 March 2014	Paralimni, Cyprus	Switzerland	1–1	1–1	2014 Cyprus Women's Cup
28	7 March 2014	Paralimni, Cyprus	Republic of Ireland	1–1	1–1	2014 Cyprus Women's Cup
29	15 May 2014	Ho Chi Minh City, Vietnam	Myanmar	1–0	12–0	2014 AFC Women's Asian Cup
30	17 May 2014	Ho Chi Minh City, Vietnam	Thailand	1–0	4–0	2014 AFC Women's Asian Cup
31	12 November 2014	Hsinchu, Taiwan	Guam	1–0	15–0	2015 EAFF Women's East Asian Cup qualification
32	12 November 2014	Hsinchu, Taiwan	Guam	8–0	15–0	2015 EAFF Women's East Asian Cup qualification
33	15 November 2014	Hsinchu, Taiwan	Hong Kong	1–0	9–0	2015 EAFF Women's East Asian Cup qualification
34	13 January 2015	Shenzhen, China	China	2–2	3–2	Friendly
35	15 January 2015	Shenzhen, China	Mexico	2–1	2–1	Friendly
36	4 March 2015	Nicosia, Cyprus	Italy	1–1	1–2	2015 Cyprus Women's Cup
37	5 April 2015	Incheon, South Korea	Russia	1–0	1–0	Friendly
38	8 April 2015	Incheon, South Korea	Russia	2–0	2–0	Friendly
39	13 June 2015	Montreal, Canada	Costa Rica	1–1	2–2	2015 FIFA Women's World Cup
40	3 March 2017	Nicosia, Cyprus	Scotland	1–0	2–0	2017 Cyprus Women's Cup
41	6 March 2017	Larnaca, Cyprus	New Zealand	2–0	2–0	2017 Cyprus Women's Cup
42	5 April 2017	Pyongyang, North Korea	India	8–0	10–0	2018 AFC Women's Asian Cup qualification
43	5 April 2017	Pyongyang, North Korea	India	10–0	10–0	2018 AFC Women's Asian Cup qualification
44	11 April 2017	Pyongyang, North Korea	Uzbekistan	2–0	4–0	2018 AFC Women's Asian Cup qualification
45	11 April 2017	Pyongyang, North Korea	Uzbekistan	4–0	4–0	2018 AFC Women's Asian Cup qualification
46	19 August 2018	Palembang, Indonesia	Maldives	1–0	8–0	2018 Asian Games
47	21 August 2018	Palembang, Indonesia	Indonesia	10–0	12–0	2018 Asian Games
48	21 August 2018	Palembang, Indonesia	Indonesia	12–0	12–0	2018 Asian Games
49	31 August 2018	Palembang, Indonesia	Chinese Taipei	1–0	4–0	2018 Asian Games
50	28 February 2019	Sydney, Australia	Argentina	4–0	5–0	2019 Cup of Nations
51	28 February 2019	Sydney, Australia	Argentina	5–0	5–0	2019 Cup of Nations
52	3 March 2019	Brisbane, Australia	Australia	1–1	1–4	2019 Cup of Nations
53	6 March 2019	Melbourne, Australia	New Zealand	1–0	2–0	2019 Cup of Nations
54	9 April 2019	Chuncheon, South Korea	Iceland	1–1	1–1	Friendly
55	6 October 2019	Chicago, United States	United States	1–0	1–1	Friendly
56	3 February 2020	Seogwipo, South Korea	Myanmar	1–0	7–0	2020 AFC Women's Olympic Qualifying Tournament
57	3 February 2020	Seogwipo, South Korea	Myanmar	3–0	7–0	2020 AFC Women's Olympic Qualifying Tournament
58	9 February 2020	Seogwipo, South Korea	Vietnam	3–0	3–0	2020 AFC Women's Olympic Qualifying Tournament
59	17 September 2021	Tashkent, Uzbekistan	Mongolia	5–0	12–0	2022 AFC Women's Asian Cup qualification
60	21 January 2022	Pune, India	Vietnam	1–0	3–0	2022 AFC Women's Asian Cup
61	21 January 2022	Pune, India	Vietnam	3–0	3–0	2022 AFC Women's Asian Cup
62	24 January 2022	Pune, India	Myanmar	2–0	2–0	2022 AFC Women's Asian Cup
63	30 January 2022	Pune, India	Australia	1–0	1–0	2022 AFC Women's Asian Cup
64	6 February 2022	Navi Mumbai, India	China	2–0	2–3	2022 AFC Women's Asian Cup
65	19 July 2022	Kashima, Japan	Japan	1–1	1–2	2022 EAFF E-1 Football Championship
66	22 February 2023	Bristol, England	Italy	1–1	1–2	2023 Arnold Clark Cup
67	8 July 2023	Seoul, South Korea	Haiti	1–1	2–1	Friendly
68	22 September 2023	Wenzhou, China	Myanmar	2–0	3–0	2022 Asian Games
69	25 September 2023	Wenzhou, China	Philippines	3–1	5–1	2022 Asian Games
70	24 February 2024	Oeiras, Portugal	Czech Republic	1–0	2–1	Friendly
71	5 April 2024	Icheon, South Korea	Philippines	2–0	3–0	Friendly
72	23 February 2025	Al Hamriyah, United Arab Emirates	Thailand	3–0	4–0	2025 Pink Ladies Cup
73	9 July 2025	Suwon, South Korea	China	2–2	2–2	2025 EAFF E-1 Football Championship
74	16 July 2025	Suwon, South Korea	Chinese Taipei	1–0	2–0	2025 EAFF E-1 Football Championship
75	14 March 2026	Sydney, Australia	Uzbekistan	4–0	6–0	2026 AFC Women's Asian Cup
76	17 September 2026	Osaka, Japan	Bangladesh	4–0	6–0	2026 Asian Games

== Honours ==
INAC Kobe Leonessa

- Nadeshiko League: 2011, 2012, 2013
- Empress's Cup: 2011, 2012, 2013
- Nadeshiko League Cup: 2013
- International Women's Club Championship: 2013

Chelsea

- Women's Super League: 2015, 2017, 2017–18, 2019–20, 2020–21, 2021–22
- Women's FA Cup: 2014–15, 2017–18, 2020–21, 2021–22
- FA Women's League Cup: 2019–20, 2020–21
- Women's FA Community Shield: 2020
- UEFA Women's Champions League runner-up: 2020–21

South Korea U20

- FIFA U-20 Women's World Cup third place: 2010
- AFC U-19 Women's Championship runner-up: 2009

South Korea Universiade

- Summer Universiade: 2009

South Korea

- AFC Women's Asian Cup runner-up: 2022
- Asian Games bronze medal: 2010, 2014, 2018, 2026
- EAFF Championship: 2025

Individual

- Summer Universiade Most Valuable Player: 2009
- FIFA U-20 Women's World Cup Silver Ball: 2010
- FIFA U-20 Women's World Cup Silver Shoe: 2010
- AFC U-19 Women's Championship top goalscorer: 2009
- Asian Games top goalscorer: 2010
- IFFHS Asian Women's Team of the Year: 2020, 2021, 2022, 2023, 2025
- IFFHS Asian Women's Team of All Time: 2021
- Korean FA Women's Player of the Year: 2010, 2011, 2013, 2014, 2019, 2021, 2022, 2024
- WK League Midfielder of the Year: 2022, 2023
- WK League top assist provider: 2023
- Nadeshiko League Best XI: 2012, 2013
- FA Women's Players' Player of the Year: 2014
- PFA Women's Players' Player of the Year: 2014–15
- PFA Women's Super League Team of the Year: 2014–15, 2015–16, 2017–18, 2018–19, 2019–20
- London Football Award for Women's Super League Player of the Year: 2015

Records

- South Korea all-time appearance leader: 182 appearances
- South Korea all-time top goalscorer: 76 goals
