= 2025 EAFF E-1 Football Championship (women) =

2025년 EAFF E-1 풋볼 챔피언십

Tournament details
- Host country: South Korea
- Dates: 9–16 July
- Teams: 4 (from 1 sub-confederation)
- Venues: 2 (in 2 host cities)

Final positions
- Champions: South Korea (2nd title)
- Runners-up: China
- Third place: Japan
- Fourth place: Chinese Taipei

Tournament statistics
- Matches played: 6
- Goals scored: 18 (3 per match)

The 2025 EAFF E-1 Football Championship was an association football tournament organized by the East Asian Football Federation. It was the ninth edition of the women's tournament of the EAFF E-1 Football Championship, the women's football championship of East Asia. On 1 December 2023, East Asian Football Federation announced that the tournament would be postponed to 2025, to accommodate a congested international match calendar, allowing player availability for member associations.

== Teams ==
On 17 April 2023, the East Asian Football Federation announced that seven teams including Chinese Taipei, Guam, Hong Kong, Macau, Mongolia, North Korea, and Northern Mariana Islands will compete in the preliminary round for the fourth slot in the final round, joining China, Japan, and South Korea.

| Final round | Preliminary round |
|---|---|
| South Korea (hosts); Japan; China | Chinese Taipei; Hong Kong; Guam; Mongolia; Macau (hosts and non-ranked); North Korea (withdrawn); Northern Mariana Islands (non-FIFA member) |

== Preliminary round ==
The preliminary round was held in Zhuhai and Macau from 30 November to 6 December 2023. The seven teams were split into two groups of three or four and played a round robin system.

=== Group A ===
==== Table ====
| Pos | Team | Pld | W | D | L | GF | GA | GD | Pts | Qualification |
|---|---|---|---|---|---|---|---|---|---|---|
| 1 | North Korea | 3 | 3 | 0 | 0 | 47 | 0 | +47 | 9 | Advance to preliminary final |
| 2 | Hong Kong | 3 | 2 | 0 | 1 | 12 | 12 | 0 | 6 | Advance to preliminary third place match |
| 3 | Northern Mariana Islands | 3 | 1 | 0 | 2 | 5 | 26 | −21 | 3 | Advance to preliminary fifth place match |
| 4 | Mongolia | 3 | 0 | 0 | 3 | 3 | 29 | −26 | 0 | |

Source: EAFF

==== Matches ====
30 November 2023
10:00

| Mongolia | 3–4 | Northern Mariana Islands |
|---|---|---|
| Enkhzu Batjargal 35'; Tsasan-Okhin Orogdol 60'; Namuun Bayarsaikhan 71' | Report | Andrei Chavez 23', 69'; Jannah Casarino 40', 90+4' (pen.) |

Suoka Sports Training Base Pitch 2, Zhuhai, China
Referee: Cha Min-ji (South Korea)
30 November 2023
16:00

| Hong Kong | 0–11 | North Korea |
|---|---|---|
| | Report | Sung Hyang-sim 5', 16'; Choe Kum-ok 13', 29'; Kim Kyong-yong 32'; Chung Pui Ki 41' (o.g.); Ri Su-jong 50'; Hong Song-ok 67'; Kim Jong-sim 73'; Ri Hak 90+1'; Han Jin-hong 90+2' |

Suoka Sports Training Base Pitch 2, Zhuhai, China
Referee: Dong Fangyu (China)

2 December 2023
10:00

| Northern Mariana Islands | 1–6 | Hong Kong |
|---|---|---|
| Andrei Chavez 74' | Report | Anke Leung 25' (pen.), 52'; Chan Wing Sze 36'; Cheung Wai Ki 45', 83'; So Hoi Lam 90+2' |

Suoka Sports Training Base Pitch 2, Zhuhai, China
Referee: Cha Min-ji (South Korea)
2 December 2023
16:00

| North Korea | 19–0 | Mongolia |
|---|---|---|
| Kim Chung-mi 4', 26', 83'; Hong Song-ok 6', 19', 75'; Han Jin-hong 9'; Kim Jong-sim 12', 53'; Song Chun-sim 14'; Pong Song-ae 16', 90'; Ju Hyo-sim 51' (pen.); Kim Hye-yong 55', 65'; Ri Su-jong 69', 85', 87'; Myong Yu-jong 80' | Report |

Suoka Sports Training Base Pitch 1, Zhuhai, China
Referee: Tian Jin (China)

4 December 2023
10:00

| Northern Mariana Islands | 0–17 | North Korea |
|---|---|---|
| | Report | Han Jin-hong 4', 59', 61'; Kim Jong-sim 19'; Kim Hye-yong 30', 46', 49'; Ri Su-jong 35', 71'; Kim Chung-mi 41'; Song Chun-sim 43'; Pong Song-ae 55'; Ri Kum-hyang 64' (pen.); Choe Kum-ok 66'; Hong Song-ok 73'; Sung Hyang-sim 86'; Kim Kyong-yong 90' |

Suoka Sports Training Base Pitch 2, Zhuhai, China
Referee: Dong Fangyu (China)
4 December 2023
13:00

| Hong Kong | 6–0 | Mongolia |
|---|---|---|
| Cheung Wai Ki 5', 49'; Wei Lan 26'; Amanda Khishigtsengel 31' (o.g.); Chan Wing Sze 48'; Chu Po Yan 67' | Report |

Suoka Sports Training Base Pitch 1, Zhuhai, China
Referee: Tian Jin (China)

=== Group B ===
==== Table ====
| Pos | Team | Pld | W | D | L | GF | GA | GD | Pts | Qualification |
|---|---|---|---|---|---|---|---|---|---|---|
| 1 | Chinese Taipei | 2 | 2 | 0 | 0 | 19 | 0 | +19 | 6 | Advance to preliminary final |
| 2 | Guam | 2 | 1 | 0 | 1 | 6 | 3 | +3 | 3 | Advance to preliminary third place match |
| 3 | Macau (H) | 2 | 0 | 0 | 2 | 0 | 22 | −22 | 0 | Advance to preliminary fifth place match |

Source: EAFF
(H) Hosts

==== Matches ====
30 November 2023
13:00

| Macau | 0–16 | Chinese Taipei |
|---|---|---|
| | Report | Chan Pi-han 5'; Li Yu-wen 18', 46', 50'; Su Yu-hsuan 23', 76', 87'; Lin Hsin-hui 24', 36'; Wu Kai-ching 25', 28'; Lan Yu-chieh 29', 86'; He Jia-shiuan 61'; Chang Chi-lan 71'; Liu Yu-chiao 83' |

Suoka Sports Training Base Pitch 1, Zhuhai, China
Referee: Yu Hong (China)

2 December 2023
13:00

| Macau | 0–6 | Guam |
|---|---|---|
| | Report | Jenae Perez 35'; Rebecca Bartosh 40', 70'; Kaia Malakooti 54'; Mariah Anaya 67'; Inyssa Perez 82' |

Suoka Sports Training Base Pitch 2, Zhuhai, China
Referee: Park Se-jin (South Korea)

4 December 2023
16:00

| Chinese Taipei | 3–0 | Guam |
|---|---|---|
| Lin Hsin-hui 1'; Ting Chi 8'; Zhuo Li-ping 62' | Report |

Suoka Sports Training Base Pitch 1, Zhuhai, China
Referee: Park Se-jin (South Korea)

== Preliminary placement round ==
=== Preliminary fifth place match ===
6 December 2023
13:00

| Northern Mariana Islands | 4–0 | Macau |
|---|---|---|
| Jannah Casarino 18', 80'; Pia Ngewakl 66', 75' | Report |

Suoka Sports Training Base Pitch 1, Zhuhai, China
Referee: Cha Min-ji (South Korea)

=== Preliminary third place match ===
6 December 2023
16:00

| Hong Kong | 1–1 | Guam |
|---|---|---|
| Cheung Wai Ki 65' | Report | Mariah Anaya 2' |
Penalties
| Cheung Wai Ki (penalty scored); So Hoi Lam (penalty scored); Fung Sharon (penalty scored); Chung Pui Ki (penalty scored) | 4–2 | (penalty missed) Rebecca Bartosh; (penalty scored) Inyssa Perez; (penalty scored) Lexi Taitague; (penalty missed) Jenna Merrill |

Suoka Sports Training Base Pitch 2, Zhuhai, China
Referee: Tian Jin (China)

=== Preliminary final ===
7 December 2023
20:00

| North Korea | 5–0 | Chinese Taipei |
|---|---|---|
| Choe Kum-ok 26'; Ri Hak 35', 40', 64'; Song Chun-sim 55' | Report |

Estádio Campo Desportivo, Macau
Referee: Yu Hong (China)

Chinese Taipei entered the Final round due to North Korea's withdrawal.

== Preliminary goalscorers ==
There were 103 goals scored in 12 matches, for an average of 8.58 goals per match (as of 7 December 2023).

6 goals

- (North Korea) Ri Su-jong

5 goals

- (Hong Kong) Cheung Wai Ki
- (North Korea) Han Jin-hong
- (North Korea) Hong Song-ok
- (North Korea) Kim Hye-yong

4 goals

- (North Korea) Choe Kum-ok
- (North Korea) Kim Chung-mi
- (North Korea) Kim Jong-sim
- (North Korea) Ri Hak
- (Northern Mariana Islands) Jannah Casarino

3 goals

- (Chinese Taipei) Li Yu-wen
- (Chinese Taipei) Lin Hsin-hui
- (Chinese Taipei) Su Yu-hsuan
- (North Korea) Pong Song-ae
- (North Korea) Song Chun-sim
- (North Korea) Sung Hyang-sim
- (Northern Mariana Islands) Andrei Chavez

2 goals

- (Chinese Taipei) Lan Yu-chieh
- (Chinese Taipei) Wu Kai-ching
- (Guam) Mariah Anaya
- (Guam) Rebecca Bartosh
- (Hong Kong) Chan Wing Sze
- (Hong Kong) Anke Leung
- (North Korea) Kim Kyong-yong
- (Northern Mariana Islands) Pia Ngewakl

1 goal

- (Chinese Taipei) Chan Pi-han
- (Chinese Taipei) Chang Chi-lan
- (Chinese Taipei) He Jia-shiuan
- (Chinese Taipei) Liu Yu-chiao
- (Chinese Taipei) Ting Chi
- (Chinese Taipei) Zhuo Li-ping
- (Guam) Kaia Malakooti
- (Guam) Inyssa Perez
- (Guam) Jenae Perez
- (Hong Kong) Chu Po Yan
- (Hong Kong) So Hoi Lam
- (Hong Kong) Wei Lan
- (Mongolia) Enkhzul Batjargal
- (Mongolia) Namuun Bayarsaikhan
- (Mongolia) Tsasan-Okhin Orogdol
- (North Korea) Ju Hyo-sim
- (North Korea) Myong Yu-jong
- (North Korea) Ri Kum-hyang

1 own goal

- (Hong Kong) Chung Pui Ki (against North Korea)
- (Mongolia) Amanda Khishigtsengel (against Hong Kong)

== Final round ==
The final round was held in South Korea from 9 to 16 July 2025. Following the withdrawal of North Korea, Chinese Taipei will participate in the competition. Suwon World Cup Stadium has been confirmed as the venue for four matches on 9 and 16 July 2025, and the venue for the other two matches on 13 July 2025 is Hwaseong Stadium.

=== Table ===
| Pos | Team | Pld | W | D | L | GF | GA | GD | Pts | Result |
|---|---|---|---|---|---|---|---|---|---|---|
| 1 | South Korea (C, H) | 3 | 1 | 2 | 0 | 5 | 3 | +2 | 5 (Note: Head-to-head points: South Korea, China, Japan=2; Head-to-head goal difference: South Korea, China, Japan=0; Head-to-head goal for: South Korea=3, China=2, Japan=1.) | Champions |
| 2 | China | 3 | 1 | 2 | 0 | 6 | 4 | +2 | 5 | Runners-up |
| 3 | Japan | 3 | 1 | 2 | 0 | 5 | 1 | +4 | 5 | Third place |
| 4 | Chinese Taipei | 3 | 0 | 0 | 3 | 2 | 10 | −8 | 0 | Fourth place |

Source: EAFF.com
(C) Champions; (H) Hosts

=== Matches ===
9 July 2025
16:30

| Japan | 4–0 | Chinese Taipei |
|---|---|---|
| Yakata 22'; Takikawa 25'; Takahashi 48'; Chen Ying-hui 70' (o.g.) | Report |

Suwon World Cup Stadium, Suwon
Attendance: 193
Referee: Pansa Chaisanit (Thailand)
9 July 2025
20:00

| South Korea | 2–2 | China |
|---|---|---|
| Jang Sel-gi 45+1'; Ji So-yun 90+4' | Report | Yao Wei 15'; Shao Ziqin 67' |

Suwon World Cup Stadium, Suwon
Attendance: 923
Referee: Bùi Thị Thu Trang (Vietnam)

13 July 2025
16:30

| Chinese Taipei | 2–4 | China |
|---|---|---|
| Su Yu-hsuan 55'; Chen Yu-chin 68' | Report | Shao Ziqin 8', 90+6'; Shen Mengyu 16'; Wang Yanwen 82' |

Hwaseong Stadium, Hwaseong
Attendance: 184
Referee: Cha Min-ji (South Korea)
13 July 2025
20:00

| Japan | 1–1 | South Korea |
|---|---|---|
| Narumiya 37' | Report | Jeong Da-bin 86' |

Hwaseong Stadium, Hwaseong
Attendance: 1,641
Referee: Tam Ping Wun (Hong Kong)

16 July 2025
16:00

| Japan | 0–0 | China |
|---|---|---|
| | Report |

Suwon World Cup Stadium, Suwon
Attendance: 323
Referee: Pansa Chaisanit (Thailand)
16 July 2025
19:30

| South Korea | 2–0 | Chinese Taipei |
|---|---|---|
| Ji So-yun 70' (pen.); Jang Sel-gi 85' | Report |

Suwon World Cup Stadium, Suwon
Attendance: 597
Referee: Khin Nyein Chan (Myanmar)

=== Awards ===
| Best Goalkeeper | Best Defender | Top Scorer | Most Valuable Player |
|---|---|---|---|
| (South Korea) Kim Min-jung | (Japan) Rion Ishikawa | (China) Shao Ziqin | (South Korea) Jang Sel-gi |

=== Goalscorers ===
There were 18 goals scored in 6 matches, for an average of 3 goals per match (as of 16 July 2025).

3 goals

- (China) Shao Ziqin

2 goals

- (South Korea) Jang Sel-gi
- (South Korea) Ji So-yun

1 goal

- (China) Shen Mengyu
- (China) Wang Yanwen
- (China) Yao Wei
- (Chinese Taipei) Chen Yu-chin
- (Chinese Taipei) Su Yu-hsuan
- (Japan) Hana Takahashi
- (Japan) Yume Takikawa
- (Japan) Miyu Yakata
- (Japan) Yui Narumiya
- (South Korea) Jeong Da-bin

1 own goal

- (Chinese Taipei) Chen Ying-hui (against Japan)

== See also ==
- 2025 EAFF E-1 Football Championship
