= 2006 Peace Queen Cup =

Peace Queen Cup 2006 Korea

Tournament details
- Host country: South Korea
- Dates: 28 October – 4 November
- Teams: 8 (from 4 confederations)
- Venues: 6 (in 6 host cities)

Final positions
- Champions: United States (1st title)
- Runners-up: Canada

Tournament statistics
- Matches played: 13
- Goals scored: 33 (2.54 per match)
- Top scorer(s): (Canada) Christine Sinclair (6 goals)
- Best player: (United States) Kristine Lilly

The 2006 Peace Queen Cup was first edition of Peace Queen Cup. It was held from 28 October to 4 November 2006 in South Korea.

== Venues ==
Seoul	Suwon	Cheonan
Seoul World Cup Stadium	Suwon World Cup Stadium	Cheonan Stadium
Capacity: 66,806	Capacity: 43,959	Capacity: 30,000
2006 Peace Queen Cup is located in South Korea
Changwon	Masan	Gimhae
Changwon Civic Stadium	Masan Stadium	Gimhae Stadium
Capacity: 27,085	Capacity: 21,484	Capacity: 30,000

== Group stage ==
=== Group A ===
Team	Pld	W	D	L	GF	GA	GD	Pts
Canada	3	3	0	0	10	5	+5	9
Italy	3	1	1	1	5	5	0	4
(Brazil) São Paulo XI	3	1	1	1	4	5	–1	4
South Korea	3	0	0	3	2	6	–4	0

28 October 2006
13:30

South Korea	0–1	(Brazil) São Paulo XI
		Angelica 77'

Seoul World Cup Stadium, Seoul

28 October 2006
16:00

Italy	2–3	Canada
Boni 70'; Panico 88'		Sinclair 16', 34'; Robinson 74'

Seoul World Cup Stadium, Seoul

30 October 2006
16:00

São Paulo XI (Brazil)	1–1	Italy
Suzana 53'		Perelli 21'

Masan Stadium, Masan

30 October 2006
18:00

Canada	3–1	South Korea
Sinclair 23', 49', 68'		Hong Kyung-suk 25'

Masan Stadium, Masan

1 November 2006
14:30

South Korea	1–2	Italy
Park Eun-jung 48'		Hong Kyung-suk 42' (o.g.); Panico 54'

Changwon Civil Stadium, Changwon

1 November 2006
17:30

Canada	4–2	(Brazil) São Paulo XI
Franko 1'; Hermus 6'; Sinclair 28'; Wilkinson 33'		Roseli 13'; Nilda 85'

Changwon Civil Stadium, Changwon

=== Group B ===
Team	Pld	W	D	L	GF	GA	GD	Pts
United States	3	2	1	0	5	1	+4	7
Denmark	3	2	1	0	4	2	+2	7
Australia	3	1	0	2	2	4	–2	3
Netherlands	3	0	0	3	0	4	–4	0

29 October 2006
14:30

Netherlands	0–1	Australia
		Walsh 65'

Gimhae Stadium, Gimhae

29 October 2006
17:00

United States	1–1	Denmark
Lilly 72'		Andersen 12'

Gimhae Stadium, Gimhae

31 October 2006
16:00

Australia	0–2	United States
		Lilly 20'; Kai 35'

Cheonan Stadium, Cheonan

31 October 2006
18:00

Denmark	1–0	Netherlands
Madsen 80'

Cheonan Stadium, Cheonan

2 November 2006
14:30

United States	2–0	Netherlands
Tarpley 27'; Whitehill 45+1'

Suwon World Cup Stadium, Suwon

2 November 2006
17:30

Australia	1–2	Denmark
Munoz 69'		Juliussen 13'; Rasmussen 81'

Suwon World Cup Stadium, Suwon

== Final ==
4 November 2006
17:00

Canada	0–1	United States
		Lilly 69'

Seoul World Cup Stadium, Seoul

== Awards ==
Award	Winner(s)
Golden Ball	(United States) Kristine Lilly
Golden Shoe	(Canada) Christine Sinclair
Fair Play Award	South Korea

== Goalscorers ==
6 goals

- (Canada) Christine Sinclair

3 goals

- (United States) Kristine Lilly

2 goals

- (Italy) Patrizia Panico

1 goal

- (Australia) Caitlin Munoz
- (Australia) Sarah Walsh
- (Brazil) Angelica
- (Brazil) Nilda
- (Brazil) Roseli
- (Brazil) Suzana
- (Canada) Martina Franko
- (Canada) Randee Hermus
- (Canada) Jodi-Ann Robinson
- (Canada) Rhian Wilkinson
- (Denmark) Camilla Sand Andersen
- (Denmark) Maja Juliussen
- (Denmark) Janne Madsen
- (Denmark) Johanna Rasmussen
- (Italy) Valentina Boni
- (Italy) Giulia Perelli
- (South Korea) Hong Kyung-suk
- (South Korea) Park Eun-jung
- (United States) Natasha Kai
- (United States) Lindsay Tarpley
- (United States) Cat Whitehill

1 own goal

- (South Korea) Hong Kyung-suk (against Italy)
