= Han Jin-sook =

South Korean footballer (born 1979)

Han Jin-sook 한진숙
Personal information
- Date of birth: 15 December 1979 (age 46)
- Position: Midfielder

Senior career*
Years	Team	Apps	(Gls)
- Daekyo Kangaroos

International career^{‡}
1998–2007	South Korea	22	(0)
- * Club domestic league appearances and goals ‡ National team caps and goals as of 10 June 2007

Han Jin-sook (Korean: 한진숙; born 15 December 1979) is a South Korean women's international footballer who plays as a midfielder. She is a member of the South Korea women's national football team. She was part of the team at the 2003 FIFA Women's World Cup. On club level she plays for Daekyo Kangaroos in South Korea.

== International goals ==
No.	Date	Venue	Opponent	Score	Result	Competition	Ref.
1.	1 August 2008	Jeonju World Cup Stadium, Jeonju, South Korea	China	1–0	2–0	2005 EAFF Women's Football Championship	

== Honors ==
=== International ===
- EAFF Women's Football Championship: 2005
