= 2015 EAFF Women's East Asian Cup =

2015年东亚杯女子足球赛

Tournament details
- Host country: China
- Dates: 1–8 August
- Teams: 4 (from 1 sub-confederation)

Final positions
- Champions: North Korea (2nd title)
- Runners-up: South Korea
- Third place: Japan
- Fourth place: China

Tournament statistics
- Matches played: 6
- Goals scored: 19 (3.17 per match)
- Top scorer: (North Korea) Ra Un-sim (3 goals)
- Best player: (North Korea) Wi Jong-sim

The 2015 EAFF Women's East Asian Cup was the fifth edition of the EAFF Women's East Asian Cup, an international women's football tournament organised by the East Asian Football Federation. Nine of ten EAFF member nations entered the tournament. Only Mongolia, which had not yet launched an active women's national team, did not participate.

== Rounds ==
Round	Participants	Host	Date
Preliminary round 1	GUM, MAC, NMI	Guam	20–24 July 2014
Preliminary round 2	TPE, HKG, KOR, GUM	Chinese Taipei	12–18 November 2014
Final Round	CHN, JPN, PRK, KOR	China	1–8 August 2015

== Preliminary round 1 ==
All matches were held in Guam (UTC+10).

Hosts Guam advanced to the next round with two wins.

Team	Pld	W	D	L	GF	GA	GD	Pts
Guam (H)	2	2	0	0	18	0	+18	6
Northern Mariana Islands	2	1	0	1	7	7	0	3
Macau	2	0	0	2	0	18	−18	0

Source: EAFF
(H) Hosts
20 July 2014
17:30

Guam	7−0	Northern Mariana Islands
Surber 7', 90'; Valla 8'; Zavala 30'; Amezola 50'; Kobinsky 51'; Kaufman 85'

GFA National Training Center, Dededo
Referee: Law Bik Chi (Hong Kong)

22 July 2014
17:30

Guam	11−0	Macau
? (?); Kobinsky (?); Surber (?); Kaufman (?); Perez (?); Willter (?)

GFA National Training Center, Dededo
Referee: Rikako Kuwahara (Japan)

24 July 2014
17:30

Northern Mariana Islands	7−0	Macau
Vergara 19'; Maxberry 28', 65'; Race 45'; Silberburger 73'; Castillo 81'; Schuler 90+3'

GFA National Training Center, Dededo
Referee: Rikako Kuwahara (Japan)

=== Awards ===
Top Scorer	Most Valuable Player
(Guam) Paige Surber	(Guam) Samantha Kaufman

== Preliminary round 2 ==
All matches were held in Taiwan (UTC+8).

Team	Pld	W	D	L	GF	GA	GD	Pts
South Korea	3	3	0	0	26	0	+26	9
Chinese Taipei (H)	3	2	0	1	6	2	+4	6
Hong Kong	3	1	0	2	3	11	−8	3
Guam	3	0	0	3	0	22	−22	0

Source: EAFF
(H) Hosts
12 November 2014
10:30 UTC+8

South Korea	15−0	Guam
Ji So-yun 26', 66'; Yoo Young-a 30'; Kim Hye-yeong 36'; Jeon Ga-eul 39', 56', 70', 90+1'; Kim Hye-ri 43'; Park Hee-young 49'; Yeo Min-ji 73'; Lee Jung-eun 76', 79', 83', 90+2'	report

Hsinchu County Stadium, Zhubei
Attendance: 70
Referee: Ho Sun-hui (North Korea)
12 November 2014
14:30 UTC+8

Chinese Taipei	2–0	Hong Kong
Tan Wen-lin 64', 72'	report

Hsinchu County Stadium, Zhubei
Attendance: 400
Referee: Mai Hoàng Trang (Vietnam)

15 November 2014
10:30 UTC+8

Hong Kong	0–9	South Korea
	report	Ji So-yun 16' (pen.); Jeon Ga-eul 18'; Lee Jung-eun 25', 42'; Yeo Min-ji 26', 36', 45+2', 77'; Kim Do-yeon 58'

Hsinchu County Stadium, Zhubei
Attendance: 103
Referee: Mai Hoàng Trang (Vietnam)
15 November 2014
14:30 UTC+8

Chinese Taipei	4–0	Guam
Lin Ya-han 6'; Yu Hsiu-chin 43', 77'; Lai Li-chin 49'	report

Hsinchu County Stadium, Zhubei
Attendance: 563
Referee: Kajiyama Fusako

18 November 2014
16:00 UTC+8

Guam	0–3	Hong Kong
	report	Kay Fung 8', 38'; Wong Shuk Fan 65'

Taipei Municipal Stadium, Taipei
Attendance: 127
Referee: Jung Ji Young
18 November 2014
19:00 UTC+8

Chinese Taipei	0–2	South Korea
	report	Kwon Hah-nul 32'; Jeon Ga-eul 53'

Taipei Municipal Stadium, Taipei
Attendance: 488
Referee: Kajiyama Fusako

=== Awards ===
Top Scorer	Most Valuable Player
(South Korea) Jeon Ga-eul (South Korea) Lee Jung-eun	(South Korea) Kwon Hah-nul

=== Goals ===
6 goals

- (South Korea) Jeon Ga-eul
- (South Korea) Lee Jung-eun

5 goals

- (South Korea) Yeo Min-ji

3 goals

- (South Korea) Ji So-yun

2 goals

- (Chinese Taipei) Tan Wen-lin
- (Chinese Taipei) Yu Hsiu-chin
- (Hong Kong) Kay Fung

1 goals

- (Chinese Taipei) Lai Li-chin
- (Chinese Taipei) Lin Ya-han
- (Hong Kong) Wong Shuk Fan
- (South Korea) Kim Do-yeon
- (South Korea) Kim Hye-ri
- (South Korea) Kim Hye-yeong
- (South Korea) Kwon Hah-nul
- (South Korea) Park Hee-young
- (South Korea) Yoo Young-a

== Final round ==
=== Match officials ===
Referees

- (Australia) Casey Reibelt
- (Myanmar) Thein Aye
- (Thailand) Pannipar Kamnueng
- (Vietnam) Mai Hoàng Trang

Assistant referees

- (Australia) Renae Coghill
- (Malaysia) Widiya Shamsuri
- (Singapore) Rohaidah Mohamed Nasir
- (Thailand) Praphaiphit Tarik
- (Chinese Taipei) Liu Hsiu-mei

=== Matches ===
The final stage was held in Wuhan, China on 1 to 8 August 2015. Venue: China
Date: 1 – 8 August 2015 All times listed are local (UTC+8).

Team	Pld	W	D	L	GF	GA	GD	Pts
North Korea	3	3	0	0	9	4	+5	9
South Korea	3	2	0	1	3	3	0	6
Japan	3	1	0	2	5	6	−1	3
China (H)	3	0	0	3	2	6	−4	0

Source: EAFF
(H) Hosts
1 August 2015
18:20 UTC+8

North Korea	4–2	Japan
Ri Ye-gyong 36', 66'; Ra Un-sim 79', 81'	report	Masuya 49'; Sugita 70'

Wuhan Sports Center Stadium, Wuhan
Referee: Casey Reibelt (Australia)
1 August 2015
21:00 UTC+8

China	0–1	South Korea
	report	Jung Seol-bin 27'

Wuhan Sports Center Stadium, Wuhan
Referee: Pannipar Kamnueng (Thailand)

4 August 2015
18:20 UTC+8

Japan	1–2	South Korea
Nakajima 30'	report	Cho So-hyun 54'; Jeon Ga-eul 90+3'

Wuhan Sports Center Stadium, Wuhan
Referee: Thein Aye (Myanmar)
4 August 2015
21:00 UTC+8

China	2–3	North Korea
Li Dongna 32' (pen.); Wang Shanshan 52'	report	Kim Yun-mi 5'; Wi Jong-sim 24', 69'

Wuhan Sports Center Stadium, Wuhan
Referee: Mai Hoàng Trang (Vietnam)

8 August 2015
17:10 UTC+8

South Korea	0−2	North Korea
	report	Yun Song-mi 22'; Ra Un-sim 52'

Wuhan Sports Center Stadium, Wuhan
Referee: Casey Reibelt (Australia)
8 August 2015
20:10 UTC+8

China	0–2	Japan
	report	Kumi Yokoyama 88'; Ami Sugita 90+1'

Wuhan Sports Center Stadium, Wuhan
Referee: Mai Hoàng Trang (Vietnam)

=== Awards ===
Best Goalkeeper	Best Defender	Top Scorer	Most Valuable Player
(South Korea) Kim Jung-mi	(North Korea) Kim Nam-hui	(North Korea) Ra Un-sim	(North Korea) Wi Jong-sim

=== Goals ===
3 goals

- (North Korea) Ra Un-sim

2 goals

- (Japan) Ami Sugita
- (North Korea) Ri Ye-gyong
- (North Korea) Wi Jong-sim

1 goals

- (China) Li Dongna
- (China) Wang Shanshan
- (Japan) Emi Nakajima
- (Japan) Kumi Yokoyama
- (Japan) Rika Masuya
- (North Korea) Kim Yun-mi
- (North Korea) Yun Song-mi
- (South Korea) Cho So-hyun
- (South Korea) Jeon Ga-eul
- (South Korea) Jung Seol-bin

== Final ranking ==
Pos	Team	Pld	W	D	L	GF	GA	GD	Pts	Final result
1	North Korea	3	3	0	0	9	4	+5	9	Champions
2	South Korea	6	5	0	1	29	3	+26	15	Runners-up
3	Japan	3	1	0	2	5	6	−1	3	Third place
4	China	3	0	0	3	2	6	−4	0	Fourth place
5	Chinese Taipei	3	2	0	1	6	2	+4	6	Eliminated in Second Preliminary Round
6	Hong Kong	3	1	0	2	3	11	−8	3	Eliminated in Second Preliminary Round
7	Guam	5	2	0	3	18	22	−4	6	Eliminated in Second Preliminary Round
8	Northern Mariana Islands	2	1	0	1	7	7	0	3	Eliminated in First Preliminary Round
9	Macau	2	0	0	2	0	18	−18	0	Eliminated in First Preliminary Round

Source: EAFF

Per statistical convention in football, matches decided in extra time are counted as wins and losses, while matches decided by penalty shoot-out are counted as draws.
