= Northern Mariana Islands women's national football team =

Women's national association football team representing the Northern Mariana Islands

Northern Mariana Islands
- Association: Northern Mariana Islands Football Association
- Confederation: AFC (Asia)
- Sub-confederation: EAFF (East Asia)
- FIFA code: MNP
First colors	Second colors

First international
- Northern Mariana Islands 0–7 Guam (Dededo, Guam; April 1, 2007)

Biggest win
- Northern Mariana Islands 7–0 Macau (Dededo, Guam; July 24, 2014)

Biggest defeat
- South Korea 19–0 Northern Mariana Islands (Tainan County, Taiwan; August 26, 2009)

The Northern Mariana Islands women's national football team is the international women's football team of the Commonwealth of the Northern Mariana Islands, controlled by the Northern Mariana Islands Football Association.

The association is a member of the East Asian Football Federation and the Asian Football Confederation.

== Results and fixtures ==
The following is a list of match results in the last 12 months, as well as any future matches that have been scheduled.

Legend

Win Draw Lose Fixture

=== 2026 ===
5 June EAFF E-1 Football Championship Preliminary round	Chinese Taipei	5–0	Northern Mariana Islands	Dededo, Guam
19:15 UTC+10	Hsu Yi-yun 12'; Matsunaga 16', 66'; Su Yu-hsuan 58'; Chen Ying-hui 62'	Report		Stadium: GFA National Training Center; Attendance: 175; Referee: Pansa Chaisanit (Thailand)

7 June EAFF E-1 Football Championship Preliminary round	Northern Mariana Islands	0–13	Chinese Taipei	Dededo, Guam
14:30 UTC+10		Report	Liu Yu-chiao 1', 41'; Huang Ke-sin 13'; Wu Kai-ching 17', 45'; Chang Chi-lan 49', 62', 75'; He Jia-shuan 60', 64', 83'; Chen Ying-hui 67' (pen.); Li Yi-wen 90'	Stadium: GFA National Training Center; Attendance: 75; Referee: Sugino Azusa (Japan)

== Coaching staff ==
=== Current coaching staff ===
As of 21 May 2023.

Name	Role

=== Manager history ===
As of 14 January 2022, after the match against Guam.

Name	Period	Matches	Wins	Draws	Losses	Winning %	Notes

(If statistics are unavailable, display former coaches in bulleted list form)

== Players ==
=== Current squad ===
The following players 20 were called up for the 2024 EAFF E-1 Football Championship Preliminary round from 30 November to 7 December 2023 in Zhuhai, China.

Caps and goals correct as of: 2 December 2023, after the match against Hong Kong

No.	Pos.	Player	Date of birth (age)	Caps	Goals	Club
1	GK	Deseha Iha Salas Mendiola	25 August 2006 (age 20)	2	0	(Northern Mariana Islands Football Association)
12	GK	Mia Ysabela Dela Pacion Abuan	25 April 2007 (age 19)	1	0	(Northern Mariana Islands Football Association)
2	DF	Christina Ngelkes Aldan Atalig	4 February 2005 (age 21)	2	0	(Northern Mariana Islands Football Association)
14	DF	Dianne Marie Jaylo Pablo	15 January 1998 (age 28)	2	0	(Northern Mariana Islands Football Association)
15	DF	Sophia Marie Agasang Quintos	13 March 2006 (age 20)	1	0	(Northern Mariana Islands Football Association)
17	DF	Gabrielle Rose Race	17 April 1998 (age 28)	1	0	(Northern Mariana Islands Football Association)
19	DF	Julie Anne Mago Chavez	19 April 2008 (age 18)	0	0	(Northern Mariana Islands Football Association)
20	DF	Kelsey Lynn McClellan	31 July 1990 (age 36)	2	0	(Northern Mariana Islands Football Association)
21	DF	Tyana Cristine Derla Kileleman Hix	29 July 2005 (age 21)	0	0	(Northern Mariana Islands Football Association)
22	DF	Bernadette Tapanee Horey	16 April 2000 (age 26)	2	0	(Northern Mariana Islands Football Association)
3	MF	Britany Nec Kanha Wally	4 July 2000 (age 26)	2	0	(Northern Mariana Islands Football Association)
5	MF	Khristelle Lysa Alita Itaas	11 July 2003 (age 23)	2	0	(Northern Mariana Islands Football Association)
6	MF	Summer Angel Castro Manahane	12 June 2006 (age 20)	0	0	(Northern Mariana Islands Football Association)
9	MF	Andrei Kaithlyn Mago Chavez	12 May 2007 (age 19)	2	3	(Northern Mariana Islands Football Association)
10	MF	Pia Helene Edangel Sablan Ngewakl	22 December 2006 (age 19)	2	0	(Northern Mariana Islands Football Association)
11	MF	Guinevere Rina Coleman Borja	12 February 2001 (age 25)	2	0	(Northern Mariana Islands Football Association)
13	MF	Katrina Ortizo Costales	20 February 2003 (age 23)	2	0	(Northern Mariana Islands Football Association)
16	MF	Tamia Lei Derla Kileleman Hix	23 January 2007 (age 19)	2	0	(Northern Mariana Islands Football Association)
7	FW	Rizza Uvero Relucio	20 November 2006 (age 19)	2	0	(Northern Mariana Islands Football Association)
8	FW	Jannah Nillo Casarino	1 October 2004 (age 22)	2	2	(Northern Mariana Islands Football Association)

(Players are listed within position group by kit number, order of caps, then alphabetically)
(Players' ages, caps, goals and clubs should be up to date – not as of the squad announcement, as per this discussion)

=== Recent call-ups ===
The following players have also been called up to the Northern Mariana Islands squad within the last twelve months.

Pos.	Player	Date of birth (age)	Caps	Goals	Club	Latest call-up
Notes: ^{INJ} = Withdrew due to injury; ^{PRE} = Preliminary squad / standby; ^{RET} = Retired from the national team; ^{SUS} = Serving suspension; ^{WD} = Player withdrew from the squad due to non-injury issue.

(Players are listed within position group by order of latest call-up, caps, and then alphabetically)
(Injury icons should not be used in rosters as they violate MOS:TEXTASIMAGES as outlined in this discussion)

== Records ==
As of 14 January 2022, after the match against Guam.

Players in bold are still active with Northern Mariana Islands.

=== Most appearances ===
Rank	Name	Caps	Goals	Career

=== Top goalscorers ===
Rank	Name	Goals	Caps	Ratio	Career

(If the section features an image, remove the columned formatting)

== Competitive record ==
=== AFC Women's Asian Cup ===
AFC Women's Asian Cup record										Qualification record					
Year	Round	Position	GP	W	D	L	GS	GA		GP	W	D	L	GS	GA
(Hong Kong) 1975 to (Australia) 2006	Did not exist									Did not exist					
(Vietnam) 2008	Not an AFC member									Not an AFC member					
(China) 2010	Could not enter*									Could not enter*					
(Vietnam) 2014	Could not enter*									Could not enter*					
(Jordan) 2018	Could not enter*									Could not enter*					
(India) 2022	Did not enter									Did not enter					
(Australia) 2026	Did not enter									Did not enter					
Total	—	0/20	–	–	–	–	–	–	–	–	–	–	–	–	

*Draws include knockout matches decided on penalty kicks. As the AFC Women's Asian Cup is also qualification for the FIFA Women's World Cup, the Northern Mariana Islands are ineligible for the World Cup. Starting with the 2022 Women's Asian Cup qualifying round, they are allowed to qualify for the Asian Cup only.

=== EAFF E-1 Football Championship ===
EAFF E-1 Football Championship record										Qualification record					
Year	Round	Position	GP	W	D	L	GS	GA		GP	W	D	L	GS	GA
(South Korea) 2005	Did not exist									Did not exist					
(China) 2008	Not an EAFF member									Not an EAFF member					
(Japan) 2010	Did not qualify									4	0	0	4	1	51
(South Korea) 2013	Did not qualify									2	0	0	2	0	17
(China) 2015	Did not qualify									2	1	0	1	7	7
(Japan) 2017	Did not qualify									2	0	1	1	0	5
(South Korea) 2019	Did not qualify									3	0	2	1	2	3
(Japan) 2022	Did not participate									Not held					
(South Korea) 2025	Did not qualify									4	2	0	2	9	26
(China) 2028	Did not qualify									2	0	0	2	0	18
Total	—	0/10	–	–	–	–	–	–	–	19	3	3	13	19	127

*Draws include knockout matches decided on penalty kicks.

== See also ==
- Sports in the Northern Mariana Islands
  - Football in the Northern Mariana Islands
    - Women's football in the Northern Mariana Islands
- Northern Mariana Islands men's national football team
