= Giulia Perelli =

Giulia Perelli may refer to:

- Giulia Perelli (footballer)
- Giulia Perelli (tennis)
