= Kwon Hah-nul =

South Korean footballer (born 1988)

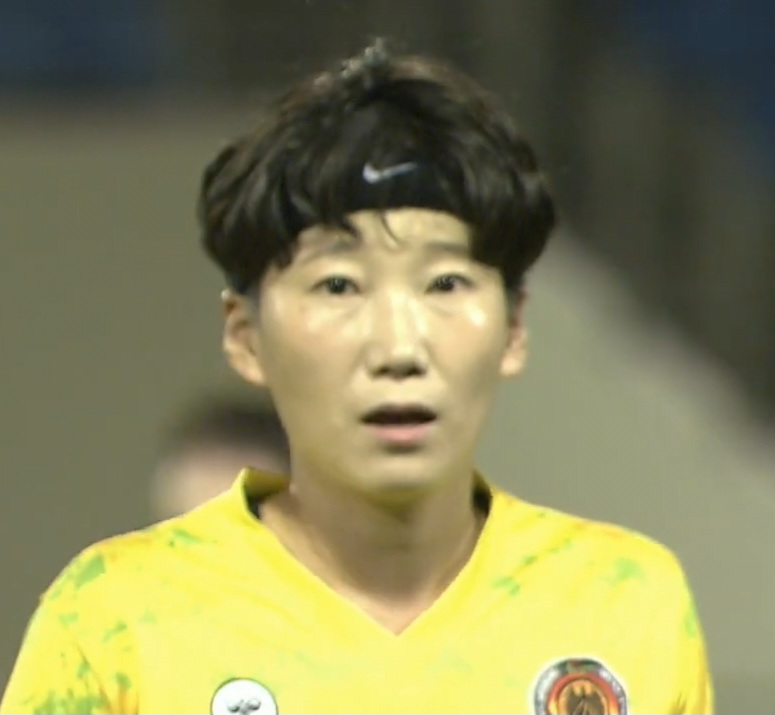

Personal information
- Date of birth: 7 March 1988 (age 38)
- Height: 1.57 m (5 ft 2 in)
- Position: Midfielder

Team information
- Current team: Mungyeong Sangmu
- Number: 8

Senior career*
Years	Team	Apps	(Gls)
2010–	Mungyeong Sangmu		

International career
2005	South Korea U17	5	(3)
2004–2007	South Korea U20	11	(4)
2006–2023	South Korea	109	(15)
- * Club domestic league appearances and goals

Kwon Hah-nul (Korean: 권하늘, Korean pronunciation: [kwʌn.ɦa.nɯl] or [kwʌn] [ha.nɯl]; born 7 March 1988) is a South Korean professional footballer and soldier who plays as a midfielder for Mungyeong Sangmu. A member of the so-called '88 line' group of Korean women's footballers born in 1988, Kwon is considered a legend of Korean women's football and in 2015, she became the first woman to make 100 appearances for the South Korean national team.

== Early life ==
Kwon enjoyed various sports, including football, as a young child but as there were no U-12 girls' football teams in Goyang at the time, she joined an athletics club instead. A church pastor suggested she should take up football, and although at first her mother was opposed to the idea, Kwon started playing football after transferring to Shindo Elementary School in Uijeongbu, initially playing for a boys' team. Kwon went on to attend Uiduk University.

== Club career ==
Kwon was selected by Busan Sangmu in the first round of the 2010 WK League new players draft.

By 2015, Kwon passed her long-service examination and was promoted to Sergeant first class. Known as a long-serving 'one-club woman', Kwon has since been promoted to Master sergeant.

She achieved the milestone of 300 WK League appearances in 2024. Having previously served as club captain from 2019 to 2023, Kwon took on the role again in the 2026 WK League season.

== International career ==
Kwon made her senior debut for South Korea as a high school student at the 2006 Asian Games in Qatar. She was part of the South Korean squad that won the bronze medal at the 2010 Asian Games. When South Korea repeated the achievement at the 2014 Asian Games, Kwon scored one of three goals in the bronze medal match against Vietnam. She played at the 2015 FIFA Women's World Cup, where South Korea progresseed to the knockout stage of the tournament for the first time ever. Later the same year, Kwon became the first South Korean woman to join the FIFA Century Club, making her 100th senior international appearance at the 2015 EAFF East Asian Cup.

== Career statistics ==
=== International ===
As of match played 28 September 2023

Appearances and goals by national team and year
National team	Year	Apps	Goals
South Korea	2006	5	0
South Korea	2007	7	0
South Korea	2008	17	1
South Korea	2009	6	4
South Korea	2010	11	2
South Korea	2011	10	1
South Korea	2012	6	0
South Korea	2013	9	0
South Korea	2014	17	7
South Korea	2015	15	0
South Korea	2016	2	0
South Korea	2021	1	0
South Korea	2022	1	0
South Korea	2023	2	0
Total		109	15

Scores and results list South Korea's goal tally first, score column indicates score after each Kwon Hah-nul goal.

List of international goals scored by Kwon Hah-nul
No.	Date	Venue	Opponent	Score	Result	Competition	Ref.
1	14 June 2008	Suwon World Cup Stadium, Suwon, South Korea	New Zealand	1-1	2-1	2008 Peace Queen Cup	
2	24 August 2009	Tainan County Stadium, Tainan County, Taiwan	Guam	4-0	9-0	2010 EAFF Women's Football Championship qualifiers	
3	24 August 2009	Tainan County Stadium, Tainan County, Taiwan	Guam	5-0	9-0	2010 EAFF Women's Football Championship qualifiers	
4	24 August 2009	Tainan County Stadium, Tainan County, Taiwan	Guam	7-0	9-0	2010 EAFF Women's Football Championship qualifiers	
5	30 August 2009	Tainan County Stadium, Tainan County, Taiwan	Chinese Taipei	3-0	6-0	2010 EAFF Women's Football Championship qualifiers	
6	14 November 2010	University Town Stadium, Guangzhou, China	Vietnam	4-1	6-1	2010 Asian Games	
7	14 November 2010	University Town Stadium, Guangzhou, China	Vietnam	6-1	6-1	2010 Asian Games	
8	11 September 2011	Shandong Provincial Stadium, Jinan, China	Australia	1-0	1-2	2012 Olympic qualifiers	
9	11 March 2014	Tasos Markos Stadium, Paralimni, Cyprus	New Zealand	1-0	4-0	2014 Cyprus Cup	
10	11 March 2014	Tasos Markos Stadium, Paralimni, Cyprus	New Zealand	4-0	4-0	2014 Cyprus Cup	
11	15 May 2014	Nhong That Stadium, Ho Chi Minh City, Vietnam	Myanmar	8-0	12-0	2014 AFC Women's Asian Cup	
12	21 September 2014	Munhak Stadium, Incheon, South Korea	Maldives	8-0	13-0	2014 Asian Games	
13	21 September 2014	Munhak Stadium, Incheon, South Korea	Maldives	12-0	13-0	2014 Asian Games	
14	1 October 2014	Incheon Football Stadium, Incheon, South Korea	Vietnam	1-0	3-0	2014 Asian Games	
15	18 November 2014	Taipei Municipal Stadium, Taipei, Taiwan	Chinese Taipei	1-0	2-0	2015 EAFF Women's East Asian Cup qualifiers	
