= Hong Kyung-suk =

South Korean footballer (born 1984)

Personal information
- Date of birth: October 14, 1984 (age 42)
- Place of birth: South Korea
- Height: 1.70 m (5 ft 7 in)
- Positions: Defender; midfielder

Team information
- Current team: Bhutan (coach)

Youth career
- Yeojoo Institute of Technology

Senior career*
Years	Team	Apps	(Gls)
2005–2007	Seoul Amazones		
2008–2015	Daekyo Kangaroos	36	(1)

International career^{‡}
2002–2010	South Korea	58	(4)

Managerial career
- 2022–2023: Bhutan
Medal record
Women's football
Representing South Korea
Asian Games
Bronze medal – third place	2010 Guangzhou	Team
- * Club domestic league appearances and goals ‡ National team caps and goals as of 06:54, 20 March 2026 (UTC)

- Hong Kyung-suk
- Hangul: 홍경숙
- RR: Hong Gyeongsuk
- MR: Hong Kyŏngsuk

Hong Kyung-suk (Korean: 홍경숙, Korean pronunciation: [hoŋ.ɡjʌŋ.suk̚] or [hoŋ] [kjʌŋ.suk̚]; born October 14, 1984) is a South Korean football coach and former international player who served as head coach for the Bhutanese women's national football team.

== Club career ==
Hong played for Seoul City Amazones before transferring to Daekyo Kangaroos. In 2012 she became the first WK League player to return to the league after having given birth.

== International career ==
Hong was part of the South Korean squad that won bronze at the 2010 Asian Games, the country's first medal in women's football at the tournament.

== Career statistics ==
Scores and results list South Korea's goal tally first, score column indicates score after each Hong Kyung-suk goal.

List of international goals scored by Hong Kyung-suk
No.	Date	Venue	Opponent	Score	Result	Competition	Ref.
1	4 October 2002	Yangsan Stadium, Yangsan, South Korea	Chinese Taipei	1–0	2–1	2002 Asian Games	
2	20 April 2004	Hiroshima Stadium, Hiroshima, Japan	Myanmar	7-0	7-0	2004 Olympics qualifying competition	
3	30 October 2006	Masan Sports Complex, Masan, South Korea	Canada	1-1	1-3	2006 Peace Queen Cup	
4	26 August 2009	Tainan County Stadium, Tainan, Taiwan	Northern Mariana Islands	6-0	19-0	2010 Women's East Asian Cup qualifiers	

== Honours ==
=== South Korea ===
- Women's East Asian Cup champions: 2005
