= Lan Yu-chieh =

Taiwanese footballer (born 2000)

Personal information
- Date of birth: 16 November 2000 (age 25)
- Place of birth: Kaohsiung City, Taiwan
- Position: Midfielder

Team information
- Current team: Kaohsiung Sunny Bank

Senior career*
Years	Team	Apps	(Gls)
- Kaohsiung Sunny Bank

International career^{‡}
2014	Chinese Taipei U14		(1)
2014	Chinese Taipei U16		(2)
2016–2018	Chinese Taipei U19	6	(5)
2019–	Chinese Taipei	8	(0)
- * Club domestic league appearances and goals ‡ National team caps and goals as of 10 February 2020

Lan Yu-chieh (Chinese: 藍昱絜; born 16 November 2000) is a Taiwanese footballer who plays as a midfielder for Taiwan Mulan Football League club Kaohsiung Sunny Bank and the Chinese Taipei women's national team.

== International goals ==
No.	Date	Venue	Opponent	Score	Result	Competition
1.	30 November 2023	Suoka Sports Training Base Pitch 1, Zhuhai, China	Macau	6–0	16–0	2024 EAFF E-1 Football Championship
2.	30 November 2023	Suoka Sports Training Base Pitch 1, Zhuhai, China	Macau	15–0	16–0	2024 EAFF E-1 Football Championship
