= Miyu Yakata =

Japanese footballer

Personal information
- Date of birth: 30 December 1999 (age 26)
- Place of birth: Kyoto Prefecture, Japan
- Height: 1.60 m (5 ft 3 in)
- Position: Forward

Team information
- Current team: MyNavi Sendai Ladies
- Number: 13

Senior career*
Years	Team	Apps	(Gls)
2013–2020	Cerezo Osaka Sakai Ladies	123	(35)
2021–2023	MyNavi Sendai Ladies	38	(11)
2023–2025	Cerezo Osaka Yanmar Ladies		
2025–	MyNavi Sendai Ladies		

International career^{‡}
2025–	Japan	1	(1)
- * Club domestic league appearances and goals ‡ National team caps and goals as of 9 July 2025

Miyu Yakata (born 30 December 1999) is a Japanese professional footballer who plays as a forward for WE League club MyNavi Sendai Ladies and the Japan national team.

== Club career ==
Yakata made her WE League debut on 12 September 2021.

== International career ==
On 9 July 2025, on her debut for Japan, she scored her first international goal at 2025 EAFF E-1 Football Championship in South Korea against Chinese Taipei.

== Career statistics ==
=== International goals ===
List of international goals scored by Miyu Yakata
No.	Date	Venue	Opponent	Score	Result	Competition
1.	9 July 2025	Suwon World Cup Stadium, Suwon, South Korea	Chinese Taipei	1–0	4–0	2025 EAFF E-1 Football Championship
