= Kim Sang-hoon =

South Korean footballer and coach

Kim Sang-hoon 김상훈/金湘勳
Personal information
- Full name: Kim Sang-hoon
- Date of birth: 8 June 1973 (age 53)
- Place of birth: South Korea
- Height: 1.85 m (6 ft 1 in)
- Position: Defender

Youth career
- 1992–1996: Soongsil University

Senior career*
Years	Team	Apps	(Gls)
1996–2001	Ulsan Hyundai Horangi	110	(4)
2002–2003	Pohang Steelers	41	(1)
2004	Seongnam Ilhwa Chunma	9	(0)
Total		160	(5)

International career
1995–1996	South Korea U-23	5	(0)
1995–1999	South Korea	17	(6)

Managerial career
- 2006–2009: Guam women's
- 2011–2013: Ulsan Hyundai (assistant coach)
- 2014–2015: Guam women's
- 2018–2019: Mokpo City FC
- 2020–2021: Guam women's
- 2021–2022: Guam
- 2022–2023: Guam
- * Club domestic league appearances and goals as of 30 April 2010

Kim Sang-hoon (born 8 June 1973) is a football coach and former player from South Korea.

== Club career ==
Kim has spent most of his club career playing for Ulsan Hyundai Horangi.

== International career ==
Kim frequently represented South Korea between 1995 and 1999. He has played in 1996 Summer Olympics.

== Managerial career ==
Kim is currently the Head Coach of the Matao, Guam National Team - his first time at the helm of the team. Kim initially returned to Guam in 2020 to serve as Technical Director at Guam FA and Head Coach of Masakåda, Guam Women's National Team before taking on the role of Head Coach of the Guam Men's National Team in late 2021. He had been appointed Guam women's national football team manager from 2014 to 2015. His first stint at the helm of the team was from 2006 to 2009.
