= Risa Shimizu (footballer) =

Japanese footballer

Risa Shimizu 清水 梨紗
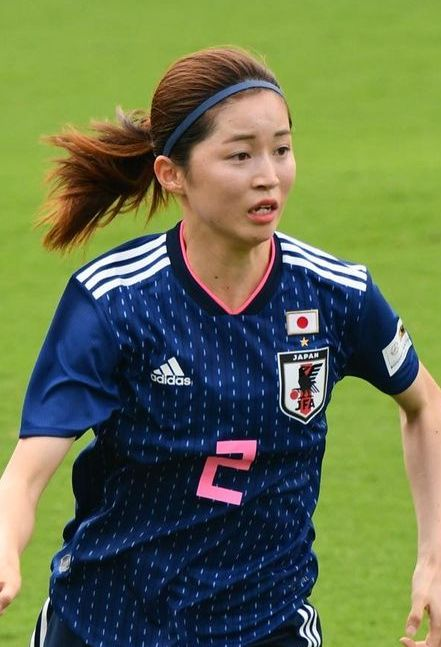
- Shimizu with Japan in 2019

Personal information
- Date of birth: June 15, 1996 (age 30)
- Place of birth: Kōbe, Hyōgo, Japan
- Height: 1.60 m (5 ft 3 in)
- Position: Defender

Team information
- Current team: Manchester City
- Number: 2

Youth career
- 2009–2012: Tokyo Verdy Beleza

Senior career*
Years	Team	Apps	(Gls)
2013–2022	Tokyo Verdy Beleza	165	(4)
2022–2024	West Ham United	44	(1)
2024–	Manchester City	1	(0)
2025–2026	→ Liverpool (loan)	14	(0)

International career^{‡}
2012	Japan U-17	4	(1)
2018–	Japan	91	(4)
Medal record
Women's football
Representing Japan
AFC Women's Asian Cup
Winner	2018 Jordan
Winner	2026 Australia
Asian Games
Gold medal – first place	2018 Jakarta-Palembang	Team
AFC U-19 Women's Championship
Winner	2015 China
AFC U-16 Women's Championship
Winner	2011 China
- * Club domestic league appearances and goals as of 22:40, 7 November 2026 (UTC) ‡ National team caps and goals as of 22:40, 7 November 2026 (UTC)

Risa Shimizu (清水 梨紗, Shimizu Risa; IPA: [ɕimizɯ ɾisa]; born June 15, 1996) is a Japanese professional football player who plays as a right-back for Women's Super League club Manchester City and the Japan national team.

Born and raised in Kobe, Hyogo Prefecture, Shimizu played youth football for Tokyo Verdy Beleza and subsequently began her professional career with the club in 2013. Shimizu moved to West Ham United in 2022. She made her senior international debut for the Japan national team in 2018 and has since won 73 caps.

== Early life and career ==
Shimizu was born in Kobe, Hyōgo Prefecture on June 15, 1996. She began playing football aged seven years old, influenced by her two years older sister. Her family moved to Yokohama, in Kanagawa Prefecture the following year, and she joined local club FC Susukino Ladies. By the time she was ten, Shimizu was a prolific striker for her team in national junior competitions.

In 2009, aged 12, she was accepted into Menina, the nation's top youth academy of the club she would later play for, Tokyo Verdy Beleza. She initially played as a forward but was gradually converted into a midfielder, and eventually settled on the fullback position which she would specialise. While at the academy, she befriended and rose through the ranks with fellow players such as Yui Hasegawa and Yuka Momiki, all of whom would go on to play for the Japan national team together.

In addition to football, Shimizu was a talented runner from an early age and had competed in statewide marathon competitions at elementary level.

== Club career ==
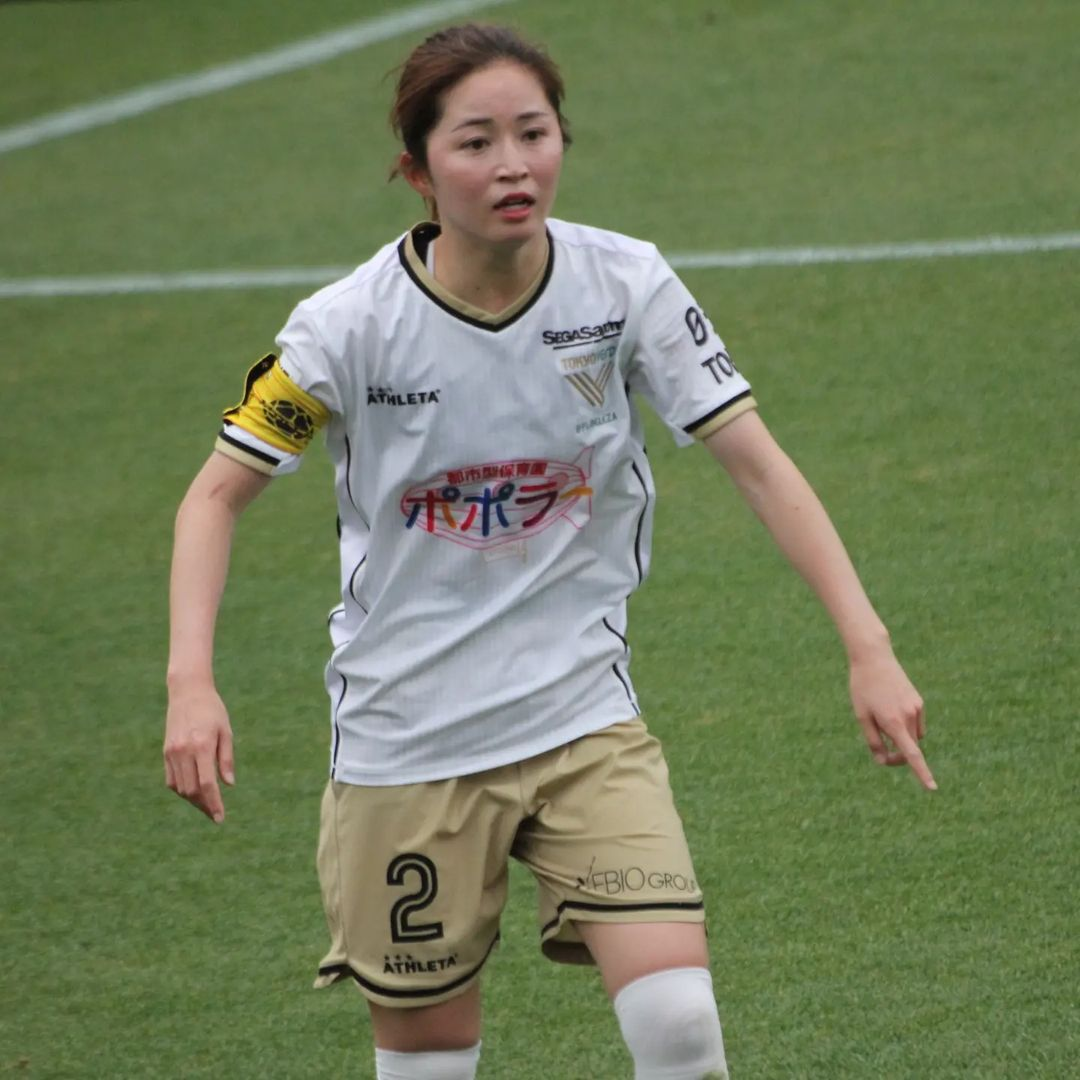
Shimizu wearing the captain's armband for Tokyo Verdy Beleza in 2022

=== Tokyo Verdy Beleza ===
Having progressed through the youth set-up of Tokyo Verdy Beleza, the club with the most number of titles in the top flight of women's football in Japan, Shimizu was promoted to the senior team at the age of seventeen. On 23 March 2013, she made her debut in the Nadeshiko League against FC Kibi IU Charme. She established herself as the first choice right-back in her first professional season, making 24 appearances in all competitions.

She scored her first goal for the club on 15 June 2014, in a match against the same opponents she made her debut with. In the 2015 Nadeshiko League season, Shimizu played in every single league game and was one of the key figures who led the team to win the championship that year, ending a five-year drought for the domestic title. In the years since, she has won multiple trophies with Beleza; including five successive domestic titles, five Empress's Cup, three Nadeshiko League Cup and the inaugural AFC Women's Club Championship. She had won the domestic triple crown with Beleza, having done so in consecutive year in the 2018 and 2019 season.

One of the most consistent performers in the league, Shimizu was first chosen to the Nadeshiko League Best XI in the 2017 season and has since been selected for five consecutive seasons, including the first inaugural WE League season after the league was revamped and turned fully professional. In 2020, she was named captain of the club. In August 2022, Shimizu left Tokyo Verdy Beleza after almost a decade with the club

=== West Ham United ===
On 28 August 2022, Shimizu signed a two-year contract with English club West Ham United. She made her competitive debut for the club on 19 September 2022 in a 1–0 win over Everton. She would quickly established herself as a key player to the squad, playing in all but one match across all competition and starting in all 22 league matches for the club. She would end up ranking second in total minutes for West Ham United among all players during the 2022–23 season. She scored her first goal for the club on 21 January 2024 in the 3–4 loss against Tottenham Hotspur. Her departure from the club was announced on 30 June that year.

=== Manchester City ===
On 12 July 2024, Shimizu signed a three-year contract with Manchester City. On 12 September 2024, Manchester City announced that she had suffered an anterior cruciate ligament (ACL) injury.

==== Liverpool (loan) ====
On 5 September 2025, Shimizu joined Liverpool on a season-long loan from Manchester City. She made her Reds debut as a late substitute in a 4–1 Merseyside Derby defeat to Everton at Anfield on the opening day of the 2025–26 Women's Super League season. Shimizu scored her first goal for the club later that month, in a 5–0 Women's League Cup win over Sunderland at St Helens Stadium.

== International career ==
Shimizu was first called up to a training camp for the Japan U-14 national team in 2010. The next year, she participated in the 2011 AFC U-16 Women's Championship held in Nanjing, China. In 2012, she was selected to the Japan U-17 national team for 2012 FIFA U-17 Women's World Cup, where she scored in a group stage win against Mexico.

She received her first senior cap for the Japan national team on 22 October 2017, in a 2–0 win against Switzerland in the MS&AD Cup. At the 2018 Algarve Cup, she played in her first international tournament at senior level, coming on as a substitute against the Netherlands. Shimizu cemented her place as the starting right-back for the national team that same year, starting all the matches in Japan's victorious 2018 AFC Women's Asian Cup run where they defeated Australia 1–0 in the final to win their second consecutive title. This success was followed by a gold medal in the 2018 Asian Games, where Japan emerged champions of yet another closely contested final, with a 90th-minute goal at the death to win 1–0 over China.

She was selected to Japan's squad for the 2019 FIFA Women's World Cup in France and the 2020 Summer Olympics in her home country. She started all matches and played full games in both tournaments.

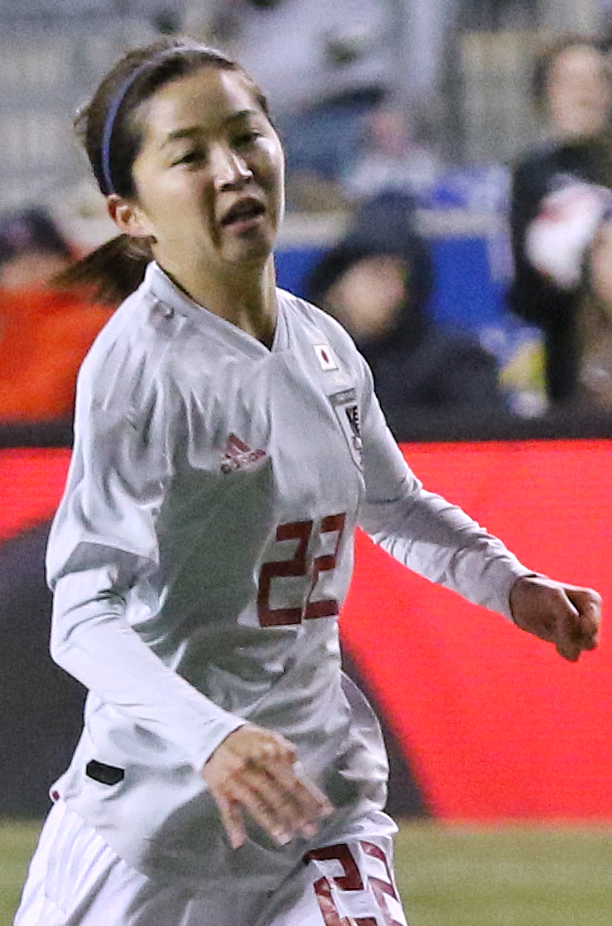
Shimizu with Japan women's team in 2019.

Shimizu was also part of Japan's squad that won the EAFF East Asian Football Championship in 2019 and 2022, and she was named Most Valuable Player of the tournament in the latter, as Japan went undefeated in the competition.

On 13 June 2023, she was included in the 23-player squad for the FIFA Women's World Cup 2023.

On August 8, she scored her first World Cup goal against Norway in the first round of the 2023 FIFA Women's World Cup knockout stage, contributing to advance to the quarterfinals.

Shimizu was selected for the 2024 Summer Olympics in Paris and played in Japan's opening match against Norway but suffered a knee injury which ruled her out of the rest of the tournament.

== Style of play ==
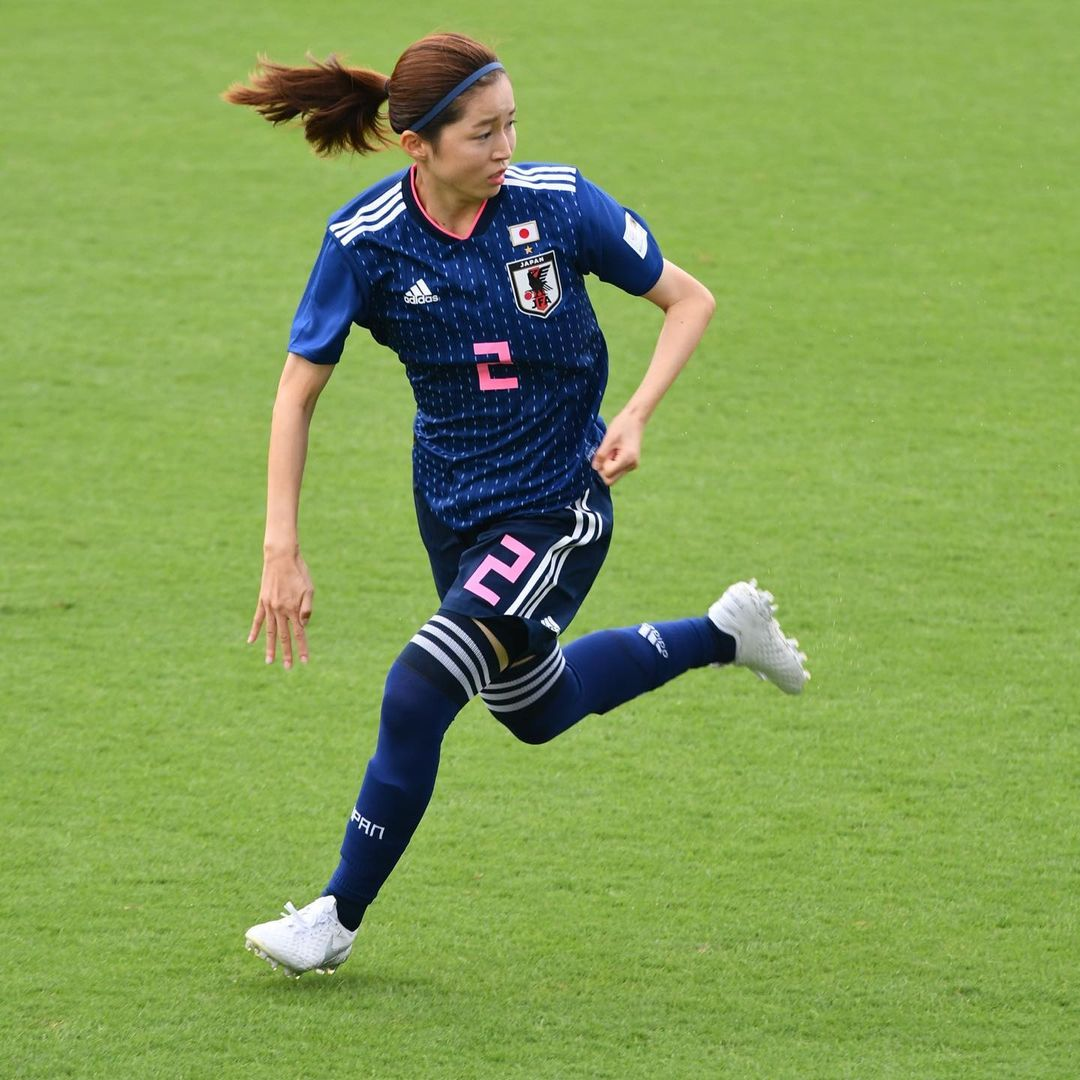
Shimizu is known for her high intensity, work-rate, stamina and defensive solidity.

Shimizu is known for her relentless and aggressive defensive capabilities. She is a modern full-back, using her stamina to make overlapping attacking runs throughout the entirety of a game whilst still getting back in position to defend.

Shimizu is also proficient at occupying attacking spaces on the pitch and creating goalscoring opportunities for her teammates. As with many Japanese players that are noted for their technical abilities on the ball, Shimizu often plays a key role in assisting goals from the high degree of accuracy on her early crosses and penetrative passes into the penalty box following dribbles down the byline.

== Career statistics ==
=== Club ===
As of match played 18 November 2026

Appearances and goals by club, season and competition
Club	Season	League			National Cup (Note: Includes Empress's Cup, Women's FA Cup)		League Cup (Note: Includes Nadeshiko League Cup, FA Women's League Cup)		Continental (Note: Includes AFC Women's Club Championship, UEFA Women's Champions League)		Total	
Club	Season	Division	Apps	Goals	Apps	Goals	Apps	Goals	Apps	Goals	Apps	Goals
Tokyo Verdy Beleza	2013	Nadeshiko League	14	0	2	0	8	0	—		24	0
Tokyo Verdy Beleza	2014	Nadeshiko League	25	1	4	1	—		—		29	2
Tokyo Verdy Beleza	2015	Nadeshiko League	23	0	4	0	—		—		27	0
Tokyo Verdy Beleza	2016	Nadeshiko League	17	0	1	0	10	0	—		28	0
Tokyo Verdy Beleza	2017	Nadeshiko League	18	0	3	0	9	1	—		30	1
Tokyo Verdy Beleza	2018	Nadeshiko League	17	1	5	0	5	0	—		27	1
Tokyo Verdy Beleza	2019	Nadeshiko League	18	0	5	0	3	0	2	0	28	0
Tokyo Verdy Beleza	2020	Nadeshiko League	13	0	5	1	—		—		18	1
Tokyo Verdy Beleza	2021–22	WE League	20	2	2	0	—		—		22	2
Tokyo Verdy Beleza	Total		165	4	31	2	35	1	2	0	233	7
West Ham United	2022–23	Women's Super League	22	0	1	0	5	0	—		28	0
West Ham United	2023–24	Women's Super League	22	1	1	0	3	0	—		26	1
West Ham United	Total		44	1	2	0	8	0	0	0	54	1
Manchester City	2024–25	Women's Super League	0	0	0	0	0	0	0	0	0	0
Manchester City	2026–27	Women's Super League	1	0	0	0	—		2	0	3	0
Manchester City	Total		1	0	0	0	0	0	2	0	3	0
Liverpool (loan)	2025–26	Women's Super League	14	0	4	0	2	1	—		20	1
Career total			224	5	37	2	45	2	4	0	310	9

=== International ===
As of match played 9 June 2026

Appearances and goals by national team and year
National Team	Year	Apps	Goals
Japan	2018	19	0
Japan	2019	12	0
Japan	2020	2	0
Japan	2021	11	1
Japan	2022	13	0
Japan	2023	16	3
Japan	2024	7	0
Japan	2025	2	0
Japan	2026	9	0
Total		91	4

Scores and results list Japan's goal tally first, score column indicates score after each Shimizu goal.

List of international goals scored by Risa Shimizu
No.	Date	Venue	Opponent	Score	Result	Competition	Ref.
1	11 April 2021	Japan National Stadium, Tokyo, Japan	Panama	2–0	7–0	Friendly	
2	14 July 2023	Yurtec Stadium Sendai, Sendai, Japan	Panama	1–0	5–0	Friendly	
3	5 August 2023	Wellington Regional Stadium, Wellington, New Zealand	Norway	2–1	3–1	2023 FIFA Women's World Cup	
4	1 November 2023	Lokomotiv Stadium, Tashkent, Uzbekistan	Vietnam	1–0	2–0	2024 AFC Women's Olympic Qualifying Tournament	

== Honours ==
Tokyo Verdy Beleza

- Nadeshiko League: 2015, 2016, 2017, 2018, 2019
- Nadeshiko League Cup: 2016, 2018, 2019
- Empress's Cup: 2014, 2017, 2018, 2019, 2020
- AFC Women's Club Championship: 2019

Japan U19

- AFC U-19 Women's Championship: 2015

Japan

- AFC Women's Asian Cup: 2018, 2026
- Asian Games: 2018
- EAFF Women's Football Championship: 2019, 2022

Individual

- Nadeshiko League Best Eleven: 2017, 2018, 2019, 2020
- WE League Best Eleven: 2021-22
- WE League Outstanding Players Award: 2021-22
- EAFF Women's Football Championship MVP: 2022
