= Chu Po Yan =

Hong Kong footballer (born 2005)

Personal information
- Date of birth: 1 August 2005 (age 21)
- Place of birth: Hong Kong
- Position: Striker

International career
Years	Team	Apps	(Gls)
- Hong Kong

Chu Po Yan (Chinese: 朱寶恩; born 1 August 2005) is a Hong Kong footballer who plays as a striker.

== Early life ==
Chu was born in 2005 in Hong Kong. She attended Lam Tai Fai College in Hong Kong.

== Football career ==
Chu played for Hong Kong side Citizen AA. She helped the club win the league.

== Style of play ==
Chu mainly operates as a striker. She has also operated as a full-back.

== International goals ==
No.	Date	Venue	Opponent	Score	Result	Competition
1.	8 April 2023	Hisor Central Stadium, Hisor, Tajikistan	Pakistan	1–0	2–0	2024 AFC Women's Olympic Qualifying Tournament
2.	4 December 2023	Suoka Sports Training Base, Zhuhai, China	Mongolia	6–0	6–0	2025 EAFF E-1 Football Championship
3.	22 October 2025	Jockey Club HKFA Football Training Centre, Tseung Kwan O, Hong Kong	Malaysia	2–2	3–2	Friendly
4.	22 October 2025	Jockey Club HKFA Football Training Centre, Tseung Kwan O, Hong Kong	Malaysia	3–2	3–2	Friendly

== Basketball career ==
Chu is a Hong Kong basketball youth international. She played for the Hong Kong women's national under-18 basketball team at the 2023 East Asian Youth Games.
