= Macau women's national football team =

Women's national association football team representing Macau

Macau
- Association: Football Association of Macau, China
- Confederation: AFC (Asia)
- Sub-confederation: EAFF (East Asia)
- Head coach: Meng Jun
- Most caps: Chan On Na; Fong Iok Wa
- Top scorer: None
- FIFA code: MAC

FIFA ranking
- Current: 176 (16 June 2026)
- Highest: 173 (December 2023; August 2024)
- Lowest: 176 (April – June 2026)

First international
- Guam 11–0 Macau (Harmon, Guam; 22 July 2014)

Biggest win
- None

Biggest defeat
- Macau 0–16 Chinese Taipei (Zhuhai, China; 30 November 2023)

The Macau women's national football team represents Macau in international women's association football and is governed by Football Association of Macau, China (MFA).

== History ==
The national federation became a FIFA affiliate in 1979.

As of June 2017, the team was not ranked in the world by FIFA.

The country's kit colours are green shirts and green shorts, or white shirts and white shorts.

The team's first match was on 22 July 2014 against the Guam national team, in which they lost 11–0.

== Results and fixtures ==
The following is a list of match results, as well as any future matches that have been scheduled.

Legend

Win Draw Lose Fixture

=== 2026 ===
| 5 April Unofficial friendly | Royal Thimphu College (Bhutan) | 2–0 | Macau | Thimphu, Bhutan |
| 16:00 UTC+6 | Lhamo x2 | | | Stadium: RTC Artificial Turf |

| 7 April Friendly | Bhutan | 7–0 | Macau | Thimphu, Bhutan |
| 18:00 UTC+6 | Ghalley 7'; Lhazom 15'; Edon 41' (pen.); Ch. Tshering 45+4', 71', 84'; Dema 87' | Report | | Stadium: Changlimithang Stadium; Referee: Sharaban Tahura (Bangladesh) |

| 5 June 2028 EAFF E-1 Championship Preliminary | Macau | 0–13 (Note: The Korea Football Association explained, 'We were notified by the EAFF via official letter on the night of the 30th of last month that the match against Macau among the three qualifying matches played by South Korea will not be recognized as an official A match.' According to FIFA regulations, the principle is that a national team may play a maximum of two matches during the A match window. However, as the EAFF's request for FIFA approval was delayed, the current EAFF qualifying schedule does not meet the minimum 48-hour rest period required before matches to protect players. In the past, FIFA approved EAFF qualifying matches held in the same or similar manner without raising issues, but as FIFA has recently applied related regulations more strictly, this measure was taken.) | South Korea | Dededo, Guam |
| 14:30 UTC+10 | | Report (EAFF) | Kim Ji-yun 2'; Jang You-been 4', 53'; Kim Ji-hyeon 11', 22', 45'; Weng Lam Chong 49' (o.g.); Lee Min-hwa 56', 75'; Park Ye-na 79'; Son Hwa-yeon 81'; Jang Sel-gi 86', 90' | Stadium: GFA National Training Center; Referee: Azusa Sugino (Japan) |

| 7 June 2028 EAFF E-1 Championship Preliminary | Guam | 3–0 | Macau | Dededo, Guam |
| 19:15 UTC+10 | | Report | | Stadium: GFA National Training Center; Referee: Azusa Sugino (Japan) |

== Players ==
=== Current squad ===
The following 22 players were called up for the two friendly matches against Bhutanese club Royal Thimphu College and the Bhutan national team on 5 and 7 April 2026, respectively.

| No. | Pos. | Player | Date of birth (age) | Club |
|---|---|---|---|---|
| 1 | GK | Chong Weng Lam | 9 February 2010 (age 16) | (Football Association of Hong Kong, China) Hongkong Football Club |
| 2 | DF | Ana Sofia da Silva (Captain) | 18 August 1984 (age 42) | (Macau Football Association) DC Systems ADRAM |
| 3 | MF | Iong Keng Chi | 9 July 2012 (age 14) | |
| 4 | DF | Chan Tin Lam | 12 September 2010 (age 16) | (Macau Football Association) Hong Feng |
| 8 | FW | Fong Iok Wa | | (Macau Football Association) DC Systems ADRAM |
| 10 | MF | Sara Kei da Fonseca | 5 August 1992 (age 34) | (Macau Football Association) DC Systems ADRAM |
| 13 | | Lam Lok I | | (Macau Football Association) DC Systems ADRAM |
| 14 | FW | Un Pui Kei | 31 March 2010 (age 16) | (Macau Football Association) Hong Feng |
| 15 | MF | Lok Sam Io | 29 September 2010 (age 16) | (Macau Football Association) Hong Feng |
| 16 | DF | Jocelyn Sam In Ho | 22 June 2009 (age 17) | |
| 20 | MF | Che Si Tong | 11 December 2011 (age 14) | (Macau Football Association) Hong Feng |
| | GK | Lo Ian Tong | | (Macau Football Association) Hong Feng |
| | DF | Lok Ka Io | 29 April 2009 (age 17) | (Macau Football Association) Hong Feng |
| | DF | Tong Hoi Lam | 10 August 2010 (age 16) | |
| | MF | Chan Ka Kei | 23 October 1990 (age 36) | (Macau Football Association) DC Systems ADRAM |
| | FW | Chan Ka Kei | | (Macau Football Association) Artilheiros |
| | | Che Weng Ieng Inês | | (Macau Football Association) DC Systems ADRAM |
| | DF | Un Pui Ka | 26 April 2009 (age 17) | (Macau Football Association) Hong Feng |
| | | Tou Hio Cheng | | (Macau Football Association) Hong Feng |
| | FW | Kuok Ut Meng | | (Macau Football Association) DC Systems ADRAM |
| | | Mélissa Carvalho | | |

== Records ==
*Active players in bold, statistics correct as of 2020.

=== Most capped players ===
| # | Player | Year(s) | Caps |

=== Top goalscorers ===
| # | Player | Year(s) | Goals | Caps |

== Competitive record ==
=== FIFA Women's World Cup ===
FIFA Women's World Cup record
| Year | Result | Position | GP | W | D* | L | GF | GA | GD |
|---|---|---|---|---|---|---|---|---|---|
| (China) 1991 to (Canada) 2015 | Did not exist | | | | | | | | |
| (France) 2019 | Did not enter | | | | | | | | |
| (Australia) (New Zealand) 2023 | Did not enter | | | | | | | | |
| (Brazil) 2027 | Did not enter | | | | | | | | |
| (Costa Rica) (Jamaica) (Mexico) (United States) 2031 | To be determined | | | | | | | | |
| (United Kingdom) 2035 | To be determined | | | | | | | | |
| Total | 0/10 | - | - | - | - | - | - | - | - |

*Draws include knockout matches decided on penalty kicks.

=== Olympic Games ===
Summer Olympics record
| Year | Result | GP | W | D* | L | GF | GA | GD |
|---|---|---|---|---|---|---|---|---|
| (United States) 1996 to (United Kingdom) 2012 | Did not exist | | | | | | | |
| (Brazil) 2016 to (France) 2024 | Did not enter | | | | | | | |
| Total | 0/8 | - | - | - | - | - | - | - |

*Draws include knockout matches decided on penalty kicks.

=== AFC Women's Asian Cup ===
AFC Women's Asian Cup record
| Year | Result | Position | GP | W | D* | L | GF | GA | GD |
|---|---|---|---|---|---|---|---|---|---|
| (Hong Kong) 1975 to (Vietnam) 2014 | Did not exist | | | | | | | | |
| (Jordan) 2018 to (Australia) 2026 | Did not enter | | | | | | | | |
| Total | 0/21 | - | - | - | - | - | - | - | - |

*Draws include knockout matches decided on penalty kicks.

=== EAFF E-1 Football Championship ===
EAFF E-1 Football Championship record
| Hosts / Year | Result | Pld | W | D* | L | GF | GA | GD |
|---|---|---|---|---|---|---|---|---|
| (South Korea) 2005 to (South Korea) 2013 | Did not exist | | | | | | | |
| (China) 2015 | Did not qualify | | | | | | | |
| (Japan) 2017 | Did not qualify | | | | | | | |
| (South Korea) 2019 | Did not qualify | | | | | | | |
| (Japan) 2022 | Did not enter | | | | | | | |
| Total | 0/7 | – | – | – | – | – | – | – |

*Draws include knockout matches decided on penalty kicks.

== See also ==
- Sport in Macau
  - Football in Macau
    - Women's football in Macau
- Macau men's national football team
