= EAFF E-1 Football Championship (women) =

Asian association football tournament for women's national teams

- Founded: 2005; 21 years ago
- Region: East Asia (EAFF)
- Teams: Preliminary: 7 Finals: 4
- Current champions: South Korea (2nd title)
- Most championships: Japan (4 titles)
- Website: eaff.com
- 2025 EAFF E-1 Football Championship

EAFF E-1 Football Championship (rebranded as the EAFF W-Cup starting with the 2025 edition) is an international football competition in East Asia for national teams of the East Asian Football Federation (EAFF). The competition between women's national teams is held alongside the men's competition.

== History ==
In 2005 there was also a combined points competition in 2005, where the results of the men's and women's teams were added together (not including qualifiers). In April 2012, the competition was renamed to the "EAFF East Asian Cup". In December 2015, the new competition name "EAFF East Asian Championship" was approved, but later changed to "EAFF E-1 Football Championship". On 2 May 2024, it was confirmed that the new format would come into effect from the 2025 edition, with the name of the competition changing to EAFF W-Cup.

== Results ==
Editions	Years	Hosts	Champions	Runners-Up	Third Place	Fourth Place
EAFF Women's Football Championship
1	2005	South Korea	South Korea	North Korea	Japan	China
2	2008	China	Japan	North Korea	China	South Korea
3	2010	Japan	Japan	China	South Korea	Chinese Taipei
4	2013	South Korea	North Korea	Japan	South Korea	China
5	2015	China	North Korea	South Korea	Japan	China
6	2017	Japan	North Korea	Japan	China	South Korea
7	2019	South Korea	Japan	South Korea	China	Chinese Taipei
8	2022	Japan	Japan	China	South Korea	Chinese Taipei
9	2025	South Korea	South Korea	China	Japan	Chinese Taipei
10	2028	China	TBD	TBD	TBD	TBD
11	2030	Japan	TBD	TBD	TBD	TBD

== Tournament winners ==
Team	Titles	Runners-up	Third place	Fourth place	Total
Japan	4 (2008, 2010, 2019, 2022)	2 (2013, 2017)	3 (2005, 2015, 2025)	–	9
North Korea	3 (2013, 2015, 2017)	2 (2005, 2008)	–	–	5
South Korea	2 (2005, 2025)	2 (2015, 2019)	3 (2010, 2013, 2022)	2 (2008, 2017)	9
China	–	3 (2010, 2022, 2025)	3 (2008, 2017, 2019)	3 (2005, 2013, 2015)	9
Chinese Taipei	–	–	–	4 (2010, 2019, 2022, 2025)	4

== Summary ==
=== Final (2005–2025) ===
Rank	Team	Part	M	W	D	L	GF	GA	GD	Points
1	Japan	9	27	16	6	5	51	19	+32	54
2	North Korea	5	15	11	2	2	25	9	+16	35
3	South Korea	9	27	9	5	13	35	35	0	32
4	China	9	27	8	7	12	25	33	–8	31
5	Chinese Taipei	4	12	0	0	12	3	43	–40	0

=== Preliminary (2008–2025) ===
Rank	Team	Part	M	W	D	L	GF	GA	GD	Points
1	Chinese Taipei	7	22	14	0	8	97	40	+57	42
2	South Korea	4	13	13	0	0	116	1	+115	39
3	Hong Kong	7	25	11	0	14	55	92	–37	33
4	Guam	7	25	8	2	15	56	87	–31	26
5	China	2	6	6	0	0	28	1	+27	18
6	North Korea	1	4	4	0	0	52	0	+52	12
7	Northern Mariana Islands	6	17	3	3	11	19	109	–90	12
8	Mongolia	2	9	2	1	6	7	50	–43	7
9	Australia	1	3	2	0	1	12	2	+10	6
10	Macau	4	10	0	3	7	0	54	–54	3

== Awards ==
Year	Most valuable player (MVP)	Top goalscorer(s)	Goals	Best goalkeeper	Best defender	Fair play Award	Best referee
2005	(North Korea) Ho Sun-hui	No award	1	(South Korea) Kim Jung-mi	(South Korea) Yoo Young-sil	Japan	No award
2008	(Japan) Homare Sawa	(Japan) Shinobu Ohno	3	(China) Zhang Yanru	(North Korea) Hong Myong-gum	Japan	No award
2010	(Japan) Homare Sawa	(China) Han Duan (Japan) Mana Iwabuchi (South Korea) Lee Jang-mi (South Korea) Yoo Young-a	2	(China) Zhang Yanru	(Japan) Azusa Iwashimizu	China	No award
2013	(North Korea) Kim Un-ju	(North Korea) Ho Un-byol (South Korea) Ji So-yun	2	No award	No award	No award	No award
2015	(North Korea) Wi Jong-sim	(North Korea) Ra Un-sim	3	(South Korea) Kim Jung-mi	(North Korea) Kim Nam-hui	No award	No award
2017	(North Korea) Kim Yun-mi	(North Korea) Kim Yun-mi	4	(North Korea) Kim Myong-sun	(North Korea) Kim Nam-hui	No award	No award
2019	(Japan) Moeka Minami	(Japan) Mana Iwabuchi	5	(Japan) Ayaka Yamashita	(South Korea) Jang Sel-gi	No award	No award
2022	(Japan) Risa Shimizu	No award	1	(Japan) Ayaka Yamashita	(China) Wang Linlin	No award	(Australia) Kate Jacewicz
2025	(South Korea) Jang Sel-gi	(China) Shao Ziqin	3	(South Korea) Kim Min-jung	(Japan) Rion Ishikawa	No award	No award

== Winning coaches ==
Year	Team	Coach
2005	South Korea	(South Korea) An Jong-goan
2008	Japan	(Japan) Norio Sasaki
2010	Japan	(Japan) Norio Sasaki
2013	North Korea	(North Korea) Kim Kwang-min
2015	North Korea	(North Korea) Kim Kwang-min
2017	North Korea	(North Korea) Kim Kwang-min
2019	Japan	(Japan) Asako Takakura
2022	Japan	(Japan) Futoshi Ikeda
2025	South Korea	(South Korea) Shin Sang-woo

== Comprehensive team results by tournament ==
Numbers refer to the final placing of each team at the respective Games.

Nation	2005	2008	2010	2013	2015	2017	2019	2022	2025	Years
China	4	3	2	4	4	3	3	2	2	9
Japan	3	1	1	2	3	2	1	1	3	9
South Korea	1	4	3	3	2	4	2	3	1	9
North Korea	2	2		1	1	1				5
Chinese Taipei			4				4	4	4	4
Total nations	4	4	4	4	4	4	4	4	4	

== See also ==
- EAFF E-1 Football Championship (men)
- AFF Women's Championship
- CAFA Women's Championship
- SAFF Women's Championship
- WAFF Women's Championship
- AFC Women's Asian Cup
