= Wang Linlin =

Chinese footballer (born 2000)

Personal information
- Date of birth: 4 August 2000 (age 26)
- Place of birth: Shanghai, China
- Height: 1.74 m (5 ft 9 in)
- Position: Defender

Team information
- Current team: Shanghai Shengli

Senior career*
Years	Team	Apps	(Gls)
	Shanghai Shengli		(1)

International career
2019–	China	9	(1)
- * Club domestic league appearances and goals

Wang Linlin (Chinese: 汪琳琳; pinyin: Wāng Lín Lín; Mandarin pronunciation: [wáŋ.lǐn.lǐn]; born 4 August 2000) is a Chinese football player who plays as a defender for Shanghai Shengli. Wang Linlin scored equaliser in the 76th minute against South Korea in the 2022 East Asia Championship, which was her first national team goal.

== Career ==
=== Club career ===
Wang Linlin played for Shanghai Women Football Club.

Her sister Wang Siqian also played for the same club.

=== International career ===
Wang Linlin represented China in 2019 AFC U-19 Women's Championship in 2019.

== International goals ==
No.	Date	Venue	Opponent	Score	Result	Competition
1.	23 July 2022	Kashima Soccer Stadium, Kashima, Japan	South Korea	1–1	1–1	2022 EAFF E-1 Football Championship
