= Kim Hye-yeong (footballer) =

South Korean footballer (born 1995)

Personal information
- Date of birth: 26 February 1995 (age 31)
- Place of birth: South Korea
- Height: 1.72 m (5 ft 7 1/2 in)
- Position: Midfielder

Team information
- Current team: Gangjin Swans
- Number: 5

Youth career
- 2008-2010: Hyundai Chungeun Middle School
- 2011-2013: Hyundai High School

Senior career*
Years	Team	Apps	(Gls)
2015-2017	Icheon Daekyo		
2018-2026	Gyeongju KHNP		
2026-	Gangjin Swans		

International career^{‡}
2011	South Korea U-17	5	(0)
2012-2014	South Korea U-20	13	(0)
2013-2015	South Korea Universiade	9	(0)
2014-2023	South Korea	11	(1)
- * Club domestic league appearances and goals ‡ National team caps and goals as of 05:01, 10 September 2026 (UTC)

Kim Hye-yeong (Korean pronunciation: [kim.ɦje̞.jʌŋ] or [kim] [hje̞.jʌŋ]; born 26 February 1995) is a South Korean football player who plays for WK League club Gangjin Swans WFC. She represented South Korea at the 2015 FIFA Women's World Cup.

== Club career ==
Kim was selected by Goyang Daekyo in the first round of the 2015 WK League new players draft. Following Daekyo's disbandment in late 2017, Kim joined Gyeongju KHNP ahead of the 2018 WK League season. In July 2026, she transferred to Gangjin Swans.
