= Guam women's national football team =

Guam
- Nickname: Masakåda
- Association: Guam Football Association
- Confederation: AFC (Asia)
- Sub-confederation: EAFF (East Asia)
- Head coach: Kimberly Sherman
- Captain: Ariya Cruz
- Top scorer: Paige Surber (10)
- FIFA code: GUM
First colors	Second colors

FIFA ranking
- Current: 98 (June 16, 2026)
- Highest: 66 (July 2003, December 2003 – March 2004)
- Lowest: 101 (March 2024)

First international
- Japan 21–0 Guam (Guangzhou, China; December 5, 1997)

Biggest win
- Guam 11–0 Macau (Harmon, Guam; July 22, 2014)

Biggest defeat
- Japan 21–0 Guam (Guangzhou, China; December 5, 1997)

Asian Cup
- Appearances: 4 (first in 1997)
- Best result: Group stage (1997, 1999, 2001, 2003)

The Guam women's national football team is the women's representative football team of Guam.

== History ==
Guam took part in the 2003 South Pacific Games in Suva, Fiji, finishing second.

The team competes regularly in the EAFF E-1 Football Championship. The team first played in the tournament's preliminary competition in 2007 against round winners South Korea, Chinese Taipei, and Hong Kong.

Guam, officially nicknamed "Masakåda" (meaning "brave woman" in Chamorro), played in the preliminary round of the 2013 EAFF East Asian Cup, losing to Northern Mariana Islands and Hong Kong.

In the 2015 EAFF East Asian Cup, Guam qualified to Preliminary round 2 after defeating Northern Mariana Islands 7–0 and Macau 11–0, Guam's biggest victory to date. Guam's Samantha Kaufman won Tournament MVP honors and teammate Paige Surber won the Tournament Golden Boot Award.

In 2016, under head coach Mark Chargualaf, the Masakåda again qualified for Round 2 of the EAFF tournament, again with back-to-back 5–0 shutout wins over both the Northern Mariana Islands and Macau. Guam's Samantha Kaufman repeated as Tournament MVP, while also earning the Co-Golden Boot Award with teammate Paige Surber.

Guam competed in the 2019 EAFF E-1 Football Championship Preliminary Competition Round 1 and finished second to host country Mongolia, despite scoring the most goals and allowing the fewest goals in the tournament.

== Team image ==
=== Nicknames ===
The Guam women's national football team has been known or nicknamed as the "Masakåda".

=== Home stadium ===
The team plays at the Guam National Football Stadium in Hagåtña. It holds 1,000 people.

== Results and fixtures ==
The following is a list of match results in the last 12 months, as well as any future matches that have been scheduled.

Legend

Win Draw Lose Fixture

=== 2026 ===
3 June EAFF E-1 Football Championship Preliminary round GS	Guam	0–5	South Korea	Dededo, Guam
18:00 UTC+10		Report (EAFF)	Jang You-been 4', 28'; Son Hwa-yeon 6', 43'; Ko Yoo-jin 57'	Stadium: GFA National Training Center; Referee: Yoshimi Yamashita (Japan)

7 June 2028 EAFF E-1 Championship Preliminary	Guam	3–0	Macau	Dededo, Guam
19:15 UTC+10		Report		Stadium: GFA National Training Center; Referee: Azusa Sugino (Japan)

== Coaching staff ==
=== Current coaching staff ===
As of 27 April 2023

Position	Name
Head coach	(Guam) Kimberly Sherman
Assistant coach	(Philippines) (Guam) Ross Awa (England) Michael Milner
Goalkeeper coach	(Netherlands) Jeroen Bos
Team doctor	(Philippines) Mikhaela Razon
Physiotherapist	(United States) Kelsey Kuehn
Team manager	(Guam) Vance Manibusan
High performance manager	(Russia) Pavel Gubenko, (Guam) Ariya Cruz
Media officer	(Guam) Ashley Marquez

=== Managerial history ===
As of 24 April 2024

- (Philippines) Noel Casilao (1996–1999)
- (United States) Thomas Renfro (1999–2004)
- (South Korea) Kim Sang-hoon (2004–2009)
- (United States) Cheri Stewart (2010–2011)
- (Guam) Elias Merfalen (2012–2013)
- (South Korea) Kim Sang-hoon (2014–2015)
- (Australia) Belinda Wilson (2016–2019)
- (South Korea) Kim Sang-hoon (2020–2021)
- (Guam) Ross Awa (2021)
- (Japan) Sakiko Ogura (2021–2022)
- (Guam) Chyna Ramirez (interim) (2022)
- (Guam) Kristin Thompson (2023–2024)
- (Guam) Kimberly Sherman (December 2024–)

== Players ==
=== Current squad ===
The following players were called up for the 2026 AFC Women's Asian Cup qualification in June–July 2025.

Caps and goals accurate up to and including 5 July 2025.

No.	Pos.	Player	Date of birth (age)	Caps	Goals	Club
1	GK	Isabella Hara	September 10, 2002 (age 24)			
18	GK	Gabrielle Moser	June 22, 2005 (age 21)			(Guam Football Association) Bank of Guam Strykers
21	GK	Sierra Ruehl	September 27, 2007 (age 19)			
—	DF	Mariah Anaya	October 10, 1999 (age 27)			
—	DF	Rebecca Bartosh	October 4, 2000 (age 26)			(Italian Football Federation) Rome City
—	DF	Maile Chargualaf				
—	DF	Marlena Connelley				
—	DF	Ariya Cruz				
—	DF	Kalle Damian				
—	DF	True Dydasco	December 11, 1998 (age 27)			
—	DF	Olivia Haddock				
—	DF	Jaelyn Han				
—	DF	Samantha Kenney	January 18, 2004 (age 22)			(Guam Football Association) Bank of Guam Strykers
—	DF	Cassandra Kido				
—	DF	Melia Kukahiko				
—	DF	Kaia Malakooti	April 13, 2004 (age 22)			
—	DF	Monica Márquez				
—	DF	Jenna Merrill	April 22, 1992 (age 34)			(Philippine Football Federation) Stallion Laguna
—	DF	Jenae Perez	August 13, 2002 (age 24)			(United States Soccer Federation) Cal State Fullerton Titans
—	DF	Mihaela Perez	August 13, 2002 (age 24)			
—	DF	Hinengi San Nicolas				
—	DF	Lexi Taitague	February 2, 2006 (age 20)			
—	DF	Kaia Villanueva	June 15, 2007 (age 19)			(United States Soccer Federation) Troy Warriors

=== Recent call-ups ===
The following players have been called up to the squad in the past 12 months.

Pos.	Player	Date of birth (age)	Caps	Goals	Club	Latest call-up

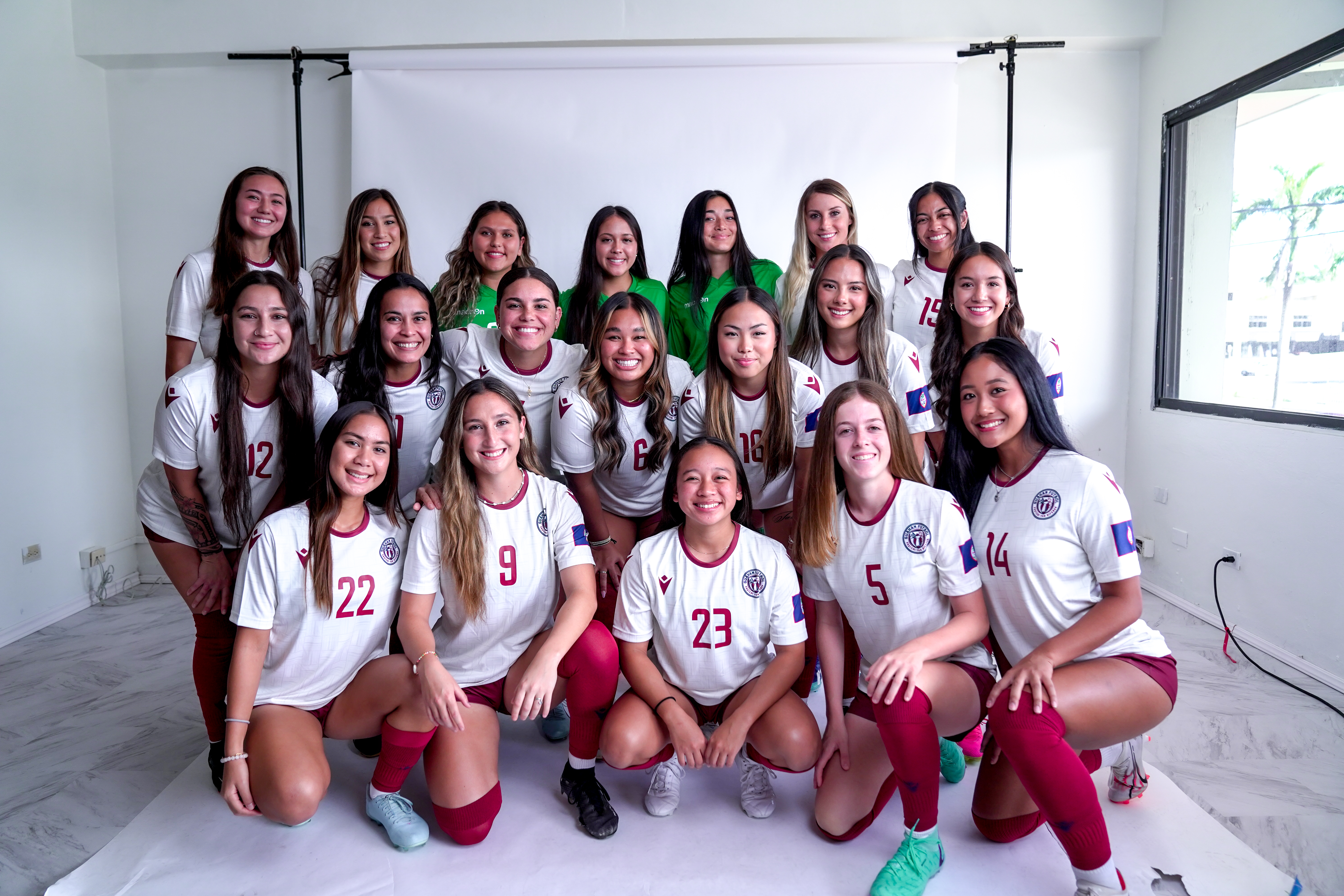
The Guam Women's National team at media day ahead of their EAFF competition.

== Records ==
*Active players in bold, statistics correct as of 1 November 2020.

=== Most capped players ===
#	Player	Year(s)	Caps

=== Top goalscorers ===
#	Player	Year(s)	Goals	Caps

== Competitive record ==
=== FIFA Women's World Cup ===
FIFA Women's World Cup
Year	Result	Position	GP	W	D*	L	GF	GA	GD
(China) 1991 to (Sweden) 1995	Did not exist								
(United States) 1999 to (Brazil) 2027	Did not qualify								
(Costa Rica) (Jamaica) (Mexico) (United States) 2031	To be determined								
(United Kingdom) 2035	To be determined								
Total		—	—	—	—	—	—	—	—

*Draws include knockout matches decided on penalty kicks.

=== AFC Women's Asian Cup ===
AFC Women's Asian Cup
Year	Result	GP	W	D*	L	GF	GA	GD
(Hong Kong) 1975 to (Chinese Taipei) 1995	Did not exist							
(China) 1997	Group stage	3	0	0	3	0	32	−32
(Philippines) 1999	Group stage	4	1	0	3	2	31	−29
(Chinese Taipei) 2001	Group stage	4	0	0	4	1	34	−33
(Thailand) 2003	Group stage	4	0	0	4	2	15	−13
(Australia) 2006	Did not qualify							
(Vietnam) 2008 to (Jordan) 2018	Did not enter							
(India) 2022 to (Australia) 2026	Did not qualify							
Total	4/19	15	1	0	14	5	112	−107

*Draws include knockout matches decided on penalty kicks.

=== EAFF E-1 Football Championship ===
EAFF E-1 Championship								Preliminary Round					
Year	Result	Pld	W	D	L	GF	GA	Pld	W	D	L	GF	GA
EAFF Women's Championship
(South Korea) 2005	Did not enter							Did not enter					
(China) 2008	Did not qualify							3	0	0	3	1	13
(Japan) 2010	Did not qualify							4	1	0	3	5	21
EAFF Women's East Asian Cup
(South Korea) 2013	Did not qualify							2	1	0	1	9	4
(China) 2015	Did not qualify							5	2	0	3	18	22
EAFF E-1 Championship (women)
(Japan) 2017	Did not qualify							5	2	0	3	11	22
(South Korea) 2019	Did not qualify							3	1	1	1	5	1
(Japan) 2022	Did not participate							Not held					
Total	0/7	0	0	0	0	0	0	22	7	1	14	49	83

=== Pacific Games ===
Pacific Games
Year	Result	GP	W	D*	L	GF	GA	GD
(Fiji) 2003	**Runners-up**	6	3	2	1	8	2	+6
(Samoa) 2007	Did not enter							
(New Caledonia) 2011	Group stage	3	0	2	1	2	3	−1
(Papua New Guinea) 2015	Did not enter							
(Samoa) 2019	Did not enter							
Total	2/5							

*Draws include knockout matches decided on penalty kicks.

== See also ==
- Sport in Guam
  - Football in Guam
    - Women's football in Guam
- Guam men's national football team
- Guam men's national under-19 football team
- Guam men's national under-17 football team
