= 2013 EAFF Women's East Asian Cup =

2013년 EAFF 여자 동아시안컵

Tournament details
- Host country: South Korea
- Dates: 17 July – 24 November 2012 (Qualification); 20–27 July 2013 (Final)
- Teams: 9 (from 1 confederation)

Final positions
- Champions: North Korea (1st title)
- Runners-up: Japan
- Third place: South Korea
- Fourth place: China

Tournament statistics
- Matches played: 15
- Goals scored: 61 (4.07 per match)
- Top scorer(s): (North Korea) Ho Un-byol (South Korea) Ji So-yun
- Best player: (North Korea) Kim Un-ju

The 2013 EAFF Women's East Asian Cup was the fourth edition of EAFF Women's East Asian Cup. There were three competition rounds. The final round was won by North Korea, for their first title of the women’s competition that began in 2005. In August 2012, Australia accepted an invitation to take part.

== Rounds ==
Round	Participants	Host	Date
Preliminary Round 1	GUM, HKG, NMI	Guam	17–21 July 2012
Preliminary Round 2	CHN, TPE, HKG, AUS	China	20–24 November 2012
Final round	KOR, JPN, PRK, CHN	South Korea	20-27 July 2013

== Preliminary round 1 ==
All matches were held in Guam (UTC+10).

Team	Pld	W	D	L	GF	GA	GD	Pts
Hong Kong	2	2	0	0	15	3	+12	6
Guam (H)	2	1	0	1	9	4	+5	3
Northern Mariana Islands	2	0	0	2	0	17	−17	0

Source: EAFF
(H) Hosts

=== Matches ===
17 July 2012
16:00

Northern Mariana Islands	0–6	Guam
	Report	Recella 5'; Surber 24', 36', 40'; Odell 44'; Willter 51'

Leo Palace Resort, Yona, Guam
Attendance: 100
Referee: Park Ji-Yeong (Korea Republic)

19 July 2012
16:00

Northern Mariana Islands	0–11	Hong Kong
	Report	Ng Wing Kum 3', 31', 55', 63' (pen.); Fung Kam Mui 21', 38'; Chan Wing Sze 33', 40' (pen.), 90+2'; Po Ching Ying 54'; Castillo 72' (o.g.)

Leo Palace Resort, Yona, Guam
Attendance: 100
Referee: He Jin (China PR)

21 July 2012
16:00

Guam	3–4	Hong Kong
Surber 48'; Perez 70', 72'	Report	Cheung Wai Ki 6'; Chan Wing Sze 24'; Lau Mung King 30'; Wong Ka Man 76'

Leo Palace Resort, Yona, Guam
Attendance: 450
Referee: Park Ji-Yeong (Korea Republic)

=== Awards ===
Top Scorer	Most Valuable Player
(Guam) Paige Surber (Hong Kong) Chan Wing Sze (Hong Kong) Ng Wing Kum	(Hong Kong) Cheung Wai Ki

=== Goals ===
4 goals

- (Guam) Paige Surber
- (Hong Kong) Chan Wing Sze
- (Hong Kong) Ng Wing Kum

2 goals

- (Guam) Anjelica Perez
- (Hong Kong) Fung Kam Mui

1 goals

- (Guam) Andrea Odell
- (Guam) Arisa Recella
- (Guam) Simone Willter
- (Hong Kong) Cheung Wai Ki
- (Hong Kong) Lau Mung King
- (Hong Kong) Po Ching Ying
- (Hong Kong) Wong Ka Man

1 own goal

- (Guam) Jeralyn Castillo

== Preliminary round 2 ==
All matches were held in Shenzhen, China (UTC+8).

Team	Pld	W	D	L	GF	GA	GD	Pts
China (H)	3	3	0	0	10	1	+9	9
Australia	3	2	0	1	12	2	+10	6
Chinese Taipei	3	1	0	2	2	10	−8	3
Hong Kong	3	0	0	3	1	12	−11	0

Source: EAFF
(H) Hosts

=== Matches ===
20 November 2012
17:00

Australia	7–0	Chinese Taipei
Gill 5', 90+3'; De Vanna 22', 51'; Simon 45+1', 83'; Uzunlar 77'	Report

Shenzhen Stadium, Shenzhen
Attendance: 523
Referee: Kajiyama Fusako (Japan)

20 November 2012
19:45

China	6–0	Hong Kong
Ma Xiaoxu 36' (pen.), 64'; Pu Wei 77'; Wang Chen 81', 90+1'; Wang Shanshan 84'	Report

Shenzhen Stadium, Shenzhen
Attendance: 1,898
Referee: Ri Hong-Sil (North Korea)

22 November 2012
17:00

Australia	4–0	Hong Kong
Butt 33'; Simon 64'; Gill 79'; Catley 90+2'	Report

Shenzhen Stadium, Shenzhen
Attendance: 488
Referee: Park Ji-Yeong (South Korea)

22 November 2012
19:45

Chinese Taipei	0–2	China
	Report	Zhang Rui 53'; Wang Shanshan 66'

Shenzhen Stadium, Shenzhen
Attendance: 1,563
Referee: Satomi Nami (Japan)

24 November 2012
15:45

China	2–1	Australia
Wang Lisi 9'; Zhang Rui 50'	Report	Gill 12'

Shenzhen Stadium, Shenzhen
Attendance: 6,333
Referee: Ri Hong-Sil (North Korea)

24 November 2012
18:30

Chinese Taipei	2–1	Hong Kong
Lai Li-chin 63', 77'	Report	Chan Wing Sze 3'

Shenzhen Stadium, Shenzhen
Attendance: 1,116
Referee: Satomi Nami (Japan)

=== Goals ===
4 goals

- (Australia) Katie Gill

3 goals

- (Australia) Kyah Simon

2 goals

- (Australia) Lisa De Vanna
- (China) Ma Xiaoxu
- (China) Wang Chen
- (China) Wang Shanshan
- (China) Zhang Rui
- (Chinese Taipei) Lai Li-chin

1 goals

- (Australia) Tameka Butt
- (Australia) Stephanie Catley
- (Australia) Servet Uzunlar
- (China) Pu Wei
- (China) Wang Lisi
- (Hong Kong) Chan Wing Sze

=== Awards ===
Top Scorer	Most Valuable Player
(Australia) Katie Gill	(China) Pu Wei

== Final round ==
=== Match officials ===
Referees

- (China) Li Juan
- (Japan) Yamagishi Sachiko
- (South Korea) Jung Ji-young
- (Thailand) Pannipar Kamnueng
- (Vietnam) Mai Hoàng Trang

Assistant referees

- (China) Cui Yong Mei
- (Japan) Teshirogin Naomi
- (South Korea) Kim Kyung-min
- (Thailand) Parichart Boonanan
- (Vietnam) Trương Thị Lệ Trinh

All times listed are local (UTC+9).

Team	Pld	W	D	L	GF	GA	GD	Pts
North Korea	3	2	1	0	3	1	+2	7
Japan	3	1	1	1	3	2	+1	4
South Korea (H)	3	1	0	2	4	5	−1	3
China	3	1	0	2	2	4	−2	3

Source: EAFF
(H) Hosts

=== Matches ===
20 July 2013
16:15

Japan	2–0	China
Ando 35'; Nakajima 57'	Report

Seoul World Cup Stadium, Seoul
Attendance: 8,500
Referee: Jung Ji-Young (Korea Republic)

21 July 2013
18:15

South Korea	1–2	North Korea
Kim Soo-yun 26'	Report	Ho Un-byol 36', 38'

Seoul World Cup Stadium, Seoul
Attendance: 6,530
Referee: Pannipar Kamnueng (Thailand)

24 July 2013
17:15

South Korea	1–2	China
Kim Na-rae 8'	Report	Wang Lisi 1'; Li Ying 66'

Hwaseong Stadium, Hwaseong
Attendance: 2,850
Referee: Yamagishi Sachiko (Japan)

25 July 2013
17:15

Japan	0–0	North Korea
	Report

Hwaseong Stadium, Hwaseong
Attendance: 1,013
Referee: Li Juan (China PR)

27 July 2013
17:15

North Korea	1–0	China
Ri Un-hyang 2'	Report

Jamsil Olympic Stadium, Seoul
Attendance: 935
Referee: Mai Hoàng Trang (Vietnam)

27 July 2013
20:00

South Korea	2–1	Japan
Ji So-yun 13', 66'	Report	Ōgimi 72'

Jamsil Olympic Stadium, Seoul
Attendance: 2,370
Referee: Pannipar Kamnueng (Thailand)

=== Goals ===
2 goals

- (North Korea) Ho Un-byol
- (South Korea) Ji So-yun

1 goals

- (China) Wang Lisi
- (China) Li Ying
- (Japan) Kozue Ando
- (Japan) Emi Nakajima
- (Japan) Yūki Ōgimi
- (North Korea) Ri Un-hyang
- (South Korea) Kim Na-rae
- (South Korea) Kim Soo-yun

=== Awards ===
Top Scorer	Most Valuable Player
(North Korea) Ho Un-byol (South Korea) Ji So-yun	(North Korea) Kim Un-ju

== Final standings ==
Rank	Team
1	North Korea
2	Japan
3	South Korea
4	China
5	Australia
6	Chinese Taipei
7	Hong Kong
8	Guam
9	Northern Mariana Islands
