= Giulia Perelli (footballer) =

Italian footballer

Personal information
- Date of birth: 23 April 1982 (age 44)
- Place of birth: Livorno, Italy
- Position: Defender

International career
Years	Team	Apps	(Gls)
- Italy

Giulia Perelli (born 23 April 1982) is an Italian women's international footballer who plays as a defender. She is a member of the Italy women's national football team. She was part of the team at the UEFA Women's Euro 2001 and UEFA Women's Euro 2005.
