= Park Eun-jung =

South Korea politician (born 1972)

- 박은정

Member of the National Assembly
- Incumbent
- Assumed office April 10, 2024
- Constituency: Proportional representation

Personal details
- Born: January 15, 1972 (age 54)
- Party: Rebuilding Korea Party (2024-)

Park Eun-jung (Korean: 박은정, born January 15, 1972) is a South Korean legal professional and a sitting member of the 22nd National Assembly. She was elected as a proportional representation lawmaker for the Rebuilding Korea Party in the April 2024 general election. She is married to Lee Jong-geun, the Director of the Criminal Department at the Supreme Prosecutors' Office, who served as the deputy head of the Prosecution Reform Support Group during Cho Kuk's tenure as Minister of Justice.

== History ==
She graduated from the Department of Law at Ewha Womans University in 1994. She passed the 39th Bar Examination in 1997, completed her training at the Judicial Research and Training Institute (as a member of the 29th class), and was appointed as a prosecutor in 2000. On February 27, 2024, she was dismissed from her position as a prosecutor for the unauthorised disclosure of internal inspection records. As a result, her license to practice law was suspended for three years, effective from the date the disciplinary action took effect. In February 2012, she garnered significant attention after making a public disclosure revealing that she had received a request from Judge Kim Jae-ho to indict someone—the husband of Na Kyung-won, a member of the 18th National Assembly.

After beginning her work specialising in cases involving women at the Wonju Branch of the Chuncheon District Prosecutors' Office in 2002, she dedicated ten years to investigating sexual violence within the Criminal Division, ultimately achieving the highest record for handling such cases within the prosecution service. While serving as a prosecutor specialising in sexual violence at the Seoul Western District Prosecutors' Office, she established the prosecution's first "Sexual Violence Crime Response Center"—predating the creation of the Women and Children Investigation Department at the Seoul Central District Prosecutors' Office. Additionally, as the head of the Supreme Prosecutors' Office's Sexual Violence Task Force, she made significant contributions to refining the prosecution's investigative guidelines and systems regarding sexual and domestic violence. She consolidated existing protocols to enact the "Guidelines on the Handling of Sexual Violence Cases and Protecting/Supporting Victims" and formulated the prosecution's first-ever "Guidelines on Handling Domestic Violence Cases and Protecting Victims." Recognised as a certified expert prosecutor in the field of sexual violence, she also had the opportunity to undergo overseas training in Sweden and Norway to study systems for protecting child victims of sexual violence.

Park Eun-jung was appointed as the Ministry of Justice’s Director of Inspection in January 2020, closely aligned with the Justice Minister Choo Mi-ae. Subsequently, serving as the working-level official for Minister Choo’s inspection of Prosecutor General Yoon Suk-yeol, she conducted the inspection aimed at ousting him.

She was dismissed by the Ministry of Justice in 2024.

Ahead of the 2024 South Korean legislative election, she joined the Rebuilding Korea Party and was nominated as the party's number one candidate for proportional representation.

== Education ==
- Graduated from Wonhwa Girls' High School.
- Bachelor of Laws, College of Law and Political Science, Ewha Womans University.

== Awards ==
- 2010 Stepping Stone Award for Respect for Women's Human Rights.
- 2014 Miji Award.

== Election results ==
Year	Election	Term	Office	Electoral district	Party	Votes	Turnout	Rank	Elected	Notes
2024	22nd National Assembly General Election	22nd	Member of the National Assembly	Proportional representation	Rebuilding Korea Party	6,874,278	24.25%	1st	Elected	

== See also ==
- Rebuilding Korea Party
- 2024-2028 South Korean National Assembly members
