= 2005 EAFF Women's Football Championship =

2005년 동아시아 여자 축구 선수권 대회

Tournament details
- Host country: South Korea
- Dates: 1–6 August
- Teams: 4 (from 1 confederation)

Final positions
- Champions: South Korea (1st title)
- Runners-up: North Korea
- Third place: Japan
- Fourth place: China

Tournament statistics
- Matches played: 6
- Goals scored: 5 (0.83 per match)
- Top scorer(s): (North Korea) Ri Un-suk (North Korea) Jo Yun-mi (South Korea) Han Jin-sook (South Korea) Park Eun-sun (South Korea) Park Eun-jung
- Best player: (North Korea) Ho Sun-hui

The First EAFF Women's Football Championship was a football competition held from August 1 to August 6, 2005 in South Korea. South Korea, who remained undefeated in the tournament, won the first edition. DPR Korea finished second.

== Matches and Results ==
Team	Pts	Pld	W	D	L	GF	GA	GD
South Korea	7	3	2	1	0	3	0	+3
North Korea	6	3	2	0	1	2	1	+1
Japan	2	3	0	2	1	0	1	−1
China	1	3	0	1	2	0	3	−3

2005-08-01

South Korea	2–0	China
Han Jin-sook 43'; Park Eun-sun 65'	Report

Jeonju World Cup Stadium, Jeonju
Attendance: 4,283

2005-08-01

North Korea	1–0	Japan
Ri Un-suk 38'	Report

Jeonju World Cup Stadium, Jeonju
Attendance: 3,500

2005-08-03

Japan	0–0	China
	Report

Daejeon World Cup Stadium, Daejeon
Attendance: 865

2005-08-03

South Korea	1–0	North Korea
Park Eun-jung 77'	Report

Jeonju World Cup Stadium, Jeonju
Attendance: 12,000

2005-08-06

China	0–1	North Korea
	Report	Jo Yun-mi 58'

Daegu World Cup Stadium, Daegu
Attendance: 500

2005-08-06

South Korea	0–0	Japan
	Report

Daegu World Cup Stadium, Daegu
Attendance: 2,826

1 goals

- (North Korea) Jo Yun-mi
- (North Korea) Ri Un-suk
- (South Korea) Han Jin-sook
- (South Korea) Park Eun-jung
- (South Korea) Park Eun-sun

== Personal Awards ==
- Best Goalkeeper Award : (South Korea) Kim Jung-mi
- Best Defender Award : (South Korea) Yoo Young-sil
- Fair play Team : Japan
- MVP : (North Korea) Ho Sun-hui
