= 2022 EAFF E-1 Football Championship (women) =

EAFF E-1 サッカー選手権 2022

Tournament details
- Host country: Japan
- Dates: 19–26 July
- Teams: 4 (from 1 sub-confederation)
- Venues: 2 (in 2 host cities)

Final positions
- Champions: Japan (4th title)
- Runners-up: China
- Third place: South Korea
- Fourth place: Chinese Taipei

Tournament statistics
- Matches played: 6
- Goals scored: 16 (2.67 per match)
- Attendance: 4,951 (825 per match)
- Top scorer(s): 13 players (1 goal each)
- Best player: (Japan) Risa Shimizu
- Best goalkeeper: (Japan) Ayaka Yamashita

The 2022 EAFF E-1 Football Championship was an association football tournament organized by the East Asian Football Federation. It was the 8th edition of the EAFF E-1 Football Championship, the football championship of East Asia. The finals were originally scheduled to be held in China. However, after China relinquished the hosting rights due to its strict containment measures and tightening restrictions on local and international movement, it was announced on 19 April 2022 that Japan would host the finals. It was Japan's third time hosting the tournament.

There were no preliminary rounds conducted. After North Korea withdrew from the competition, the remaining slot for the participating teams was awarded to Chinese Taipei based upon the FIFA rankings as of 31 March 2022. The other teams were China PR and South Korea.

== Table ==
Pos	Team	Pld	W	D	L	GF	GA	GD	Pts	Qualification or relegation
1	Japan (H, C)	3	2	1	0	6	2	+4	7	Winners
2	China	3	1	2	0	3	1	+2	5	Runners-up
3	South Korea	3	1	1	1	6	3	+3	4	Third place
4	Chinese Taipei	3	0	0	3	1	10	−9	0	Fourth place

Source: EAFF
(C) Champions; (H) Hosts

== Matches ==
19 July 2022
16:00

Japan	2–1	South Korea
Miyazawa 33'; Nagano 65'	Report (EAFF)	Ji So-yun 59'

Kashima Soccer Stadium, Kashima
Attendance: 2,200
Referee: Pansa Chaisanit (Thailand)
20 July 2022
15:30

China	2–0	Chinese Taipei
Zhang Linyan 12'; Su Hsin-yun 22' (o.g.)	Report (EAFF)

Toyota Stadium, Toyota
Attendance: 100
Referee: Edita Mirabidova (Uzbekistan)

23 July 2022
15:30

Japan	4–1	Chinese Taipei
Chiba 14'; Ueno 45+2'; Chang Su-hsin 57' (o.g.); Sugasawa 72'	Report (EAFF)	Su Hsin-yun 8'

Kashima Soccer Stadium, Kashima
Attendance: 1,051
Referee: Veronika Bernatskaia (Kyrgyzstan)
23 July 2022
19:00

China	1–1	South Korea
Wang Linlin 73'	Report (EAFF)	Choe Yu-ri 34'

Kashima Soccer Stadium, Kashima
Attendance: 352
Referee: Kate Jacewicz (Australia)

26 July 2022
16:00

South Korea	4–0	Chinese Taipei
Chang Chi-lan 35' (o.g.); Kang Chae-rim 38'; Lee Min-a 40'; Ko Min-jung 90+1'	Report (EAFF)

Kashima Soccer Stadium, Kashima
Attendance: 347
Referee: Aye Thein Thein (Myanmar)
26 July 2022
19:20

Japan	0–0	China
	Report (EAFF)

Kashima Soccer Stadium, Kashima
Attendance: 901
Referee: Pansa Chaisanit (Thailand)

== Awards ==
Best Goalkeeper	Best Defender	Most Valuable Player
(Japan) Ayaka Yamashita	(China) Wang Linlin	(Japan) Risa Shimizu

== Goalscorers ==
There were 16 goals scored in 6 matches, for an average of 2.67 goals per match.

1 goal

- (China) Wang Linlin
- (China) Zhang Linyan
- (Chinese Taipei) Su Hsin-yun
- (Japan) Remina Chiba
- (Japan) Hinata Miyazawa
- (Japan) Fuka Nagano
- (Japan) Yuika Sugasawa
- (Japan) Mami Ueno
- (South Korea) Choe Yu-ri
- (South Korea) Ji So-yun
- (South Korea) Kang Chae-rim
- (South Korea) Ko Min-jung
- (South Korea) Lee Min-a

1 own goal

- (Chinese Taipei) Chang Chi-lan (against South Korea)
- (Chinese Taipei) Chang Su-hsin (against Japan)
- (Chinese Taipei) Su Hsin-yun (against China PR)

== See also ==
- 2022 EAFF E-1 Football Championship (men)
- 2022 AFF Women's Championship
- 2022 CAFA Women's Championship
- 2022 SAFF Women's Championship
- 2022 WAFF Women's Championship
- 2022 AFC Women's Asian Cup
