= 2022 Taichung Blue Whale season =

Taichung Blue Whale
2022 season
- Head coach: Lu Kuei-hua
- Stadium: Taiyuan Football Field
- TMFL: 2nd
- AFC Championship: Runner-up (East)
- MLC: Winners
- Top goalscorer: League: Su Yu-hsuan (16); All: Su Yu-hsuan (19)
- Biggest win: Taichung Blue Whale 8–0 Taoyuan Mars
- Biggest defeat: New Taipei Hang Yuen 2–0 Taichung Blue Whale

The 2022 Taichung Blue Whale season was the club's 9th season and their 9th season in Taiwan Mulan Football League. They also participate in the 2022 AFC Women's Club Championship as the 2021 Taiwan Mulan Football League champions.

On 10 October 2022, the Blue Whales won the 2021 Mulan League Cup champions by defeating Hualien in the final.

== Kits ==
- Supplier: MIE Jersey
- Main Sponsor: Skechers

== Management team ==
Position	Name
Head coach	(Chinese Taipei) Lu Kuei-hua
Assistant coaches	(Chinese Taipei) Cheng Ya-hsun, (Chinese Taipei) Li Yan-ting
Goalkeeping coach	(Chinese Taipei) Chang Po-hsiang
Athletic trainer	(Chinese Taipei) Hong Chia-ling

- Last updated: 22 March 2024

== Players ==
N	Pos.	Nat.	Name	Age.	Since
Goalkeepers
1	GK	(Chinese Taipei)	Tsai Ming-jung	33	2022
25	GK	(Thailand)	Nattaruja Muthtanawech	26	2021
26	GK	(Chinese Taipei)	Cho Yun-Chen	19	2022
Defenders
3	DF	(Chinese Taipei)	Shen Yen-chun	23	2020
4	DF	(Chinese Taipei)	Lai Wei-ju (captain)	28	2014
7	DF	(Chinese Taipei)	Pan Shin-yu	25	2020
8	DF	(Chinese Taipei)	Wang Shu-wen	21	2018
12	DF	(Chinese Taipei)	Wu Yu	24	2018
13	DF	(Chinese Taipei)	Chang Wei-chen	33	2021
22	DF	(Chinese Taipei)	Li Pei-jung	22	2022
Midfielders
2	MF	(Chinese Taipei)	Chang Chi-lan	26	2014
6	MF	(Thailand)	Silawan Intamee	28	2022
14	MF	(Japan)	Maho Tanaka	21	2019
15	MF	(Japan)	Iori Hidaka	21	2021
16	MF	(Chinese Taipei)	Hou Fang-wei	30	2014
19	MF	(Thailand)	Pitsamai Sornsai	33	2021
21	MF	(Chinese Taipei)	Chen Jin-wen	19	2022
23	MF	(Chinese Taipei)	Liu Chien-yun	30	2014
24	MF	(Chinese Taipei)	Lin Yu-syuan	19	2022
Forwards
9	FW	(Chinese Taipei)	Nien Ching-yun	20	2020
10	FW	(Chinese Taipei)	Su Yu-hsuan	21	2021
11	FW	(Chinese Taipei)	Lai Li-chin	34	2015
17	FW	(Chinese Taipei)	Lee Yi-hsun	20	2021
18	FW	(Chinese Taipei)	Chiang Tzu-shan	19	2022
20	FW	(Chinese Taipei)	Chien Hsuan-ying	17	2021

- Ordered by squad number.

== Transfers ==
=== In ===
No.	Pos.	Player	Transferred from	Source
Preseason
1	GK	Tsai Ming-jung	(Japan) Fujizakura	
18	FW	Chiang Tzu-shan	(Chinese Taipei) Taichung Blue Whale U18	
21	MF	Chen Jin-wen	(Chinese Taipei) Taichung Blue Whale U18	
22	DF	Li Pei-jung	(Chinese Taipei) NTUS Blue Whale	
24	MF	Lin Yu-syuan	(Chinese Taipei) Taichung Blue Whale U18	
Midseason
26	GK	Cho Yun-chen	(Chinese Taipei) NTUS Blue Whale	

=== Out ===
No.	Pos.	Player	Transferred to	Source
Preseason
1	GK	Ng Cheuk Wai	(Chinese Taipei) Taoyuan Mars	
5	FW	Pao Hsin-hsuan	Retired	
18	GK	Wu Fang-yu	(Chinese Taipei) Kaohsiung Sunny Bank	
21	MF	Mariel Gutierrez	—	
24	FW	Sung Jui-hsuan	(Chinese Taipei) NTUS Blue Whale	
25	DF	Yeh Yu-hsuan	(Chinese Taipei) NTUS Blue Whale	

=== Loans in ===
No.	Pos.	Player	Loaned from	On loan until	Source
Preseason
6	MF	Silawan Intamee	(Thailand) Chonburi	—	

== Competitions ==
=== Overall record ===
Competition	First match	Last match	Starting round	Final position	Record							
Competition	First match	Last match	Starting round	Final position	Pld	W	D	L	GF	GA	GD	Win %
Taiwan Mulan Football League	16 April 2022	29 October 2022	Matchday 1	2nd	15	7	5	3	39	17	+22	46.67
Mulan League Cup	2 April 2022	10 October 2022	Semi-finals	Winner	2	2	0	0	3	2	+1	100.00
AFC Women's Club Championship	15 August 2022	21 August 2022	Group stage	2nd (East)	2	1	1	0	3	2	+1	50.00
Total					19	10	6	3	45	21	+24	52.63

=== Taiwan Mulan Football League ===
==== League table ====
Pos	Team	Pld	W	D	L	GF	GA	GD	Pts	Qualification or relegation
1	Hualien (C)	15	10	5	0	24	9	+15	35	Qualification for the AFC Women's Club Championship
2	Taichung Blue Whale	15	7	5	3	39	17	+22	26	
3	Kaohsiung Sunny Bank	15	6	4	5	31	22	+9	22	
4	New Taipei Hang Yuen	15	6	3	6	32	18	+14	21	
5	Taipei Bravo	15	4	7	4	17	14	+3	19	
6	Taoyuan Mars	15	0	0	15	5	68	−63	0	Transfer to 2023 Taiwan Mulan Football League qualifiers

(C) Champions

==== Results by round ====
Round	1	2	3	4	5	6	7	8	9	10	11	12	13	14	15
Result	W	L	W	D	W	W	L	W	W	D	D	L	D	W	D
Position															

W = Win; D = Draw; L = Loss

==== Matches ====
16 April 2022 1	Kaohsiung Sunny Bank	0–4	Taichung Blue Whale	Kaohsiung
18:00 (UTC+8)		Recap	Su Yu-hsuan 28', 86'; Chen Jin-wen 51'; Lai Li-chin 71'	Stadium: National Stadium

23 April 2022 2	Taichung Blue Whale	1–2	Hualien	Taichung
15:00 (UTC+8)	Su Yu-hsuan 88'	Recap	Zhuo Li-ping 43'; Lin Hsiao-yun 80'	Stadium: Taiyuan Football Field

7 May 2022 4	Taichung Blue Whale	2–2	Taipei Bravo	Taichung
15:00 (UTC+8)	Lin Yu-syuan 68'; Su Yu-hsuan 80'	Recap	Lin Tsu-hui 9'; Lin Ya-han 73'	Stadium: Taiyuan Football Field

21 May 2022 5	Taichung Blue Whale	6–0	Taoyuan Mars	Taichung
16:00 (UTC+8)	Tanaka 13'; Chiang Tzu-shan 47'; Chang Chi-lan 50'; Su Yu-hsuan 84', 90'; Sornsai 90+4'	Recap		Stadium: Taiyuan Football Field

11 June 2022 7	Hualien	1–0	Taichung Blue Whale	Hualien
16:00 (UTC+8)	Tsai Li-chen 63'	Recap		Stadium: Mei Lun Senior High School

2 July 2022 10	Taipei Bravo	2–2	Taichung Blue Whale	Taipei
19:00 (UTC+8)	Liu Wen-ling 55'; Lin Hsin-hui 70'	Recap	Su Yu-hsuan 43'; Lee Yi-hsun 49'	Stadium: Taipei Municipal Stadium

5 July 2022 9	Taichung Blue Whale	8–0	Taoyuan Mars	New Taipei
17:00 (UTC+8)	Su Yu-hsuan 5', 31', 45', 72', 87'; Hou Fang-wei 33'; Nien Ching-yun 65', 86'	Recap		Stadium: Fu Jen Catholic University

3 September 2022 11	Taichung Blue Whale	0–0	Hualien	Taichung
15:00 (UTC+8)		Recap		Stadium: Taiyuan Football Field

9 September 2022 3	New Taipei Hang Yuen	1–3	Taichung Blue Whale	New Taipei
16:00 (UTC+8)	Lee Yi-wen 24'	Recap	Intamee 52'; Lai Li-chin 63', 67'	Stadium: Fu Jen Catholic University

24 September 2022 12	New Taipei Hang Yuen	2–0	Taichung Blue Whale	Yilan
16:00 (UTC+8)	Yang Hsun-wei 55'; Tseng Yun-ching 87'	Recap		Stadium: Yilan Senior High School

28 September 2022 8	Taichung Blue Whale	3–1	New Taipei Hang Yuen	Taichung
16:00 (UTC+8)	Chang Chi-lan 10'; Intamee 22'; Lai Li-chin 75'	Recap	Tseng Yun-ching 90+3'	Stadium: Taiyuan Football Field

1 October 2022 6	Taichung Blue Whale	2–1	Kaohsiung Sunny Bank	Taichung
15:00 (UTC+8)	Tanaka 21'; Nien Ching-yun 23'	Recap	Lee Hsiu-chin 94'	Stadium: Taiyuan Football Field

15 October 2022 13	Taipei Bravo	1–1	Taichung Blue Whale	Taipei
19:00 (UTC+8)	Muthtanawech 75' (o.g.)	Recap	Chang Chi-lan 8'	Stadium: Taipei Municipal Stadium

22 October 2022 14	Taichung Blue Whale	3–0	Taoyuan Mars	Taichung
15:00 (UTC+8)	Su Yu-hsuan 15', 30'; Tanaka 44'	Recap		Stadium: Taiyuan Football Field

29 October 2022 15	Kaohsiung Sunny Bank	4–4	Taichung Blue Whale	Kaohsiung
15:00 (UTC+8)	Lee Hsiu-chin 23', 75', 79'; Lin Chiung-ying 90+4'	Recap	Su Yu-hsuan 36', 90+3'; Intamee 61', 83'	Stadium: Nanzih Football Stadium

=== Mulan League Cup ===
2 April 2022 Semi-finals	Kaohsiung Sunny Bank	1–2	Taichung Blue Whale	Hualien
13:00 (UTC+8)	Lee Hsiu-chin 75' (pen.)	Recap	Lai Li-chin 3'; Su Yu-hsuan 63'	Stadium: Mei Lun Senior High School

10 October 2022 Final	Taichung Blue Whale	1–1 (a.e.t.) (4–5 p)	Hualien	Taipei
19:00 (UTC+8)	Tanaka 39'	Recap	Huang Hsiang-yi 35'	Stadium: Taipei Municipal Stadium
	Penalties
	Lin Kai-ling (penalty scored); Tan Wen-lin (penalty missed); Chen Ya-huei (penalty scored); Wang Hsiang-huei (penalty scored); Zhuo Li-ping (penalty scored)		(penalty scored) Lai Li-chin; (penalty scored) Tanaka; (penalty scored) Liu Chien-yun; (penalty scored) Chang Chi-lan; (penalty scored) Su Yu-hsuan

=== AFC Women's Club Championship ===
==== Group stage ====
Pos	Team	Pld	W	D	L	GF	GA	GD	Pts	Qualification
1	(Thailand) College of Asian Scholars (H)	2	1	1	0	2	0	+2	4	Winners
2	(Chinese Taipei) Taichung Blue Whale	2	1	1	0	3	2	+1	4	
3	(Myanmar) ISPE	2	0	0	2	2	5	−3	0	

Source: AFC
(H) Hosts

15 August 2022 1	ISPE (Myanmar)	2–3	(Chinese Taipei) Taichung Blue Whale	Chonburi
18:00 (UTC+7)	Khin Marlar Tun 34'; Shwe Yee Tun 57'		Su Yu-hsuan 29', 61'; Intamee 33'	Stadium: Chonburi Stadium; Attendance: 95; Referee: Nodira Mirzoeva (Tajikistan)

21 August 2022 2	Taichung Blue Whale (Chinese Taipei)	0–0	(Thailand) College of Asian Scholars	Chonburi
18:00 (UTC+7)				Stadium: Chonburi Stadium; Attendance: 189; Referee: Edita Mirabidova (Uzbekistan)

== Statistics ==
=== Squad statistics ===
No.	Pos	Nat	Player	Total		TMFL		MLC		AFC Championship	
No.	Pos	Nat	Player	Apps	Goals	Apps	Goals	Apps	Goals	Apps	Goals
Goalkeepers
1	GK	(Chinese Taipei) TPE	Tsai Ming-jung	8	0	6	0	0+1	0	1	0
25	GK	(Thailand) THA	Nattaruja Muthtanawech	12	0	9	0	2	0	1	0
26	GK	(Chinese Taipei) TPE	Cho Yun-chen	0	0	0	0	0	0	0	0
Defenders
3	DF	(Chinese Taipei) TPE	Shen Yen-chun	11	0	7+4	0	0	0	0	0
4	DF	(Chinese Taipei) TPE	Lai Wei-ju	17	0	11+2	0	2	0	2	0
7	DF	(Chinese Taipei) TPE	Pan Shin-yu	16	0	12	0	2	0	2	0
8	DF	(Chinese Taipei) TPE	Wang Shu-wen	13	0	6+4	0	2	0	0+1	0
12	DF	(Chinese Taipei) TPE	Wu Yu	7	0	2+5	0	0	0	0	0
13	DF	(Chinese Taipei) TPE	Chang Wei-chen	3	0	0+3	0	0	0	0	0
22	DF	(Chinese Taipei) TPE	Li Pei-jung	12	0	10+1	0	0	0	1	0
Midfielders
2	MF	(Chinese Taipei) TPE	Chang Chi-lan	19	3	14+1	3	2	0	2	0
6	MF	(Thailand) THA	Silawan Intamee	14	5	9+2	4	1	0	2	1
14	MF	(Japan) JPN	Maho Tanaka	19	4	15	3	2	1	2	0
15	MF	(Japan) JPN	Iori Hidaka	2	0	1+1	0	0	0	0	0
16	MF	(Chinese Taipei) TPE	Hou Fang-wei	9	1	4+3	1	0+1	0	0+1	0
19	MF	(Thailand) THA	Pitsamai Sornsai	11	1	7+1	1	1	0	2	0
21	MF	(Chinese Taipei) TPE	Chen Jin-wen	12	1	2+8	1	0+1	0	0+1	0
23	MF	(Chinese Taipei) TPE	Liu Chien-yun	16	0	12	0	2	0	2	0
24	MF	(Chinese Taipei) TPE	Lin Yu-syuan	10	1	5+3	1	1+1	0	0	0
Forwards
9	FW	(Chinese Taipei) TPE	Nien Ching-yun	15	3	10+3	3	1	0	0+1	0
10	FW	(Chinese Taipei) TPE	Su Yu-hsuan	15	19	10+1	16	1+1	1	2	2
11	FW	(Chinese Taipei) TPE	Lai Li-chin	17	5	9+4	4	2	1	2	0
17	FW	(Chinese Taipei) TPE	Lee Yi-hsun	4	1	2	1	1	0	0+1	0
18	FW	(Chinese Taipei) TPE	Chiang Tzu-shan	12	1	3+6	1	0+1	0	1+1	0
20	FW	(Chinese Taipei) TPE	Chien Hsuan-ying	4	0	1+3	0	0	0	0	0
Own goals (1)

=== Goalscorers ===
Rank	No.	Pos.	Nat.	Player	TMFL	MLC	AFC Championship	Total
1	10	FW	(Chinese Taipei)	Su Yu-hsuan	16	1	2	19
2	11	FW	(Chinese Taipei)	Lai Li-chin	4	1	—	5
2	6	MF	(Thailand)	Silawan Intamee	4	—	1	5
4	14	MF	(Japan)	Maho Tanaka	3	1	—	4
5	2	DF	(Chinese Taipei)	Chang Chi-lan	3	—	—	3
5	9	FW	(Chinese Taipei)	Nien Ching-yun	3	—	—	3
7	16	MF	(Chinese Taipei)	Hou Fang-wei	1	—	—	1
7	17	FW	(Chinese Taipei)	Lee Yi-hsun	1	—	—	1
7	18	FW	(Chinese Taipei)	Chiang Tzu-shan	1	—	—	1
7	19	MF	(Thailand)	Pitsamai Sornsai	1	—	—	1
7	21	MF	(Chinese Taipei)	Chen Jin-wen	1	—	—	1
7	24	MF	(Chinese Taipei)	Lin Yu-syuan	1	—	—	1
Own goals (from the opponents)					—	—	—	0
Totals					39	3	3	45

=== Hat-tricks ===
Player	Against	Result	Date	Competition	Ref
(Chinese Taipei) Su Yu-hsuan	Taoyuan Mars	8–0	5 July 2022	Taiwan Football Premier League	

=== Cleansheets ===
Rank	No.	Nat.	Player	TMFL	MLC	AFC Championship	Total
1	25	(Thailand)	Nattaruja Muthtanawech	3	0	0	3
1	1	(Chinese Taipei)	Tsai Ming-jung	2	0	1	3
3	26	(Chinese Taipei)	Cho Yun-chen	—	—	—	0
Totals				5	0	1	6

== Awards ==
Player	Position	Award	Ref.
(Chinese Taipei) Su Yu-hsuan	Forward	Golden Boot	
