= 2020 Taichung Blue Whale season =

Taichung Blue Whale
2020 season
- Head coach: Lu Kuei-hua
- Stadium: Taiyuan Football Field
- TMFL: 2nd
- MLC: Runners-up
- Top goalscorer: League: Pao Hsin-hsuan (21); All: Pao Hsin-hsuan (22)
- Biggest win: Taichung Blue Whale 6–0 Kaohsiung Sunny Bank
- Biggest defeat: Hualien 5–2 Taichung Blue Whale

The 2020 Taichung Blue Whale season was the club's 7th season and their 7th season in Taiwan Mulan Football League.

== Kits ==
- Supplier: Adidas
- Main Sponsor: Skechers

== Management team ==
Position	Name
Head coach	(Chinese Taipei) Lu Kuei-hua
Assistant coaches	(Chinese Taipei) Chang Wei-chen, (Chinese Taipei) Cheng Ya-hsun, (Chinese Taipei) Lai Li-chin
Goalkeeping coach	(Chinese Taipei) Chang Po-hsiang
Athletic trainer	(Chinese Taipei) Hong Chia-ling

- Last updated: 26 June 2024

== Players ==
N	Pos.	Nat.	Name	Age.	Since
Goalkeepers
1	GK	(Chinese Taipei)	Chen Miao-wen		2019
18	GK	(Chinese Taipei)	Lin Yi-han		2020
24	GK	(Hong Kong)	Ng Cheuk Wai	23	2020
25	GK	(Chinese Taipei)	Wu Fang-yu	15	2020
Defenders
4	DF	(Chinese Taipei)	Lai Wei-ju (captain)	26	2014
7	DF	(Chinese Taipei)	Pan Shin-yu	24	2020
12	DF	(Chinese Taipei)	Wu Yu	22	2018
13	DF	(Chinese Taipei)	Tseng Wen-ting	24	2015
14	DF	(Chinese Taipei)	Shen Yen-chun	21	2020
15	DF	(Chinese Taipei)	Wang Shu-wen	19	2018
19	DF	(Chinese Taipei)	Yang Hsin-ju	20	2019
20	DF	(Chinese Taipei)	Chen Yu-tung		2019
22	DF	(Chinese Taipei)	Li Pei-jung	20	2019
Midfielders
2	MF	(Chinese Taipei)	Chang Chi-lan	24	2014
8	MF	(Chinese Taipei)	Hsieh Cheng-ya	21	2019
9	MF	(Chinese Taipei)	Lin Yu-syuan	17	2019
16	MF	(Chinese Taipei)	Hou Fang-wei	28	2014
17	MF	(Chinese Taipei)	Chan Pi-han	27	2020
21	MF	(Japan)	Maho Tanaka	19	2019
23	MF	(Chinese Taipei)	Liu Chien-yun	28	2014
Forwards
3	FW	(Chinese Taipei)	Nien Ching-yun	18	2020
5	FW	(Chinese Taipei)	Pao Hsin-hsuan	28	2018
6	FW	(Chinese Taipei)	Lai Yu-chi		2020
10	FW	(Chinese Taipei)	Lee Hsiu-chin	28	2014
11	FW	(Chinese Taipei)	Lai Li-chin	32	2015

- Ordered by squad number.

== Transfers ==
=== In ===
No.	Pos.	Player	Transferred from	Source
Preseason
3	FW	Nien Ching-yun	(Chinese Taipei) Taipei Bravo	
7	DF	Pan Shin-yu	(Chinese Taipei) Kaohsiung Sunny Bank	
14	DF	Shen Yen-chun	(Chinese Taipei) New Taipei Hang Yuen	
17	MF	Chan Pi-han	(Chinese Taipei) Hualien	
18	GK	Chou Yu-shan	(Chinese Taipei) Yung Ching HS	
Midseason
6	FW	Lai Yu-chi	(Chinese Taipei) Hui Wen HS	
24	GK	Ng Cheuk Wai	(Hong Kong) Happy Valley	
25	GK	Wu Fang-yu	(Chinese Taipei) Taichung Blue Whale U15	

=== Out ===
No.	Pos.	Player	Transferred to	Source
Preseason
3	FW	Su Yu-hsuan	(Japan) Okayama Yunogo Belle	
7	FW	Tang Yung-ching	—	
14	DF	Cheng Wen-ching	—	
18	GK	Cheng Ssu-yu	(Japan) Okayama Yunogo Belle	
Midseason
6	DF	Chang Wei-chen	—	
18	GK	Chou Yu-shan	—	

=== Loans in ===
No.	Pos.	Player	Loaned from	On loan until	Source
Midseason
18	GK	Lin Yi-han	(Chinese Taipei) Kaohsiung Sunny Bank	End of season	

== Competitions ==
=== Overall record ===
Competition	First match	Last match	Starting round	Final position	Record							
Competition	First match	Last match	Starting round	Final position	Pld	W	D	L	GF	GA	GD	Win %
Taiwan Mulan Football League	11 April 2020	19 September 2020	Matchday 1	2nd	15	11	0	4	48	22	+26	73.33
Mulan League Cup	31 October 2020	7 November 2020	Semifinals	Runner-up	2	1	0	1	2	2	+0	50.00
Total					17	12	0	5	50	24	+26	70.59

=== Taiwan Mulan Football League ===
==== League table ====
Pos	Team	Pld	W	D	L	GF	GA	GD	Pts	Qualification or relegation
1	Hualien (C)	15	12	3	0	51	18	+33	39	Qualification for the Mulan League Cup semifinals
2	Taichung Blue Whale	15	11	0	4	48	22	+26	33	Qualification for the Mulan League Cup semifinals
3	Taipei Bravo	15	7	2	6	25	23	+2	23	Qualification for the Mulan League Cup quarterfinals
4	Inter Taoyuan	15	4	4	7	17	27	−10	16	Qualification for the Mulan League Cup quarterfinals
5	New Taipei Hang Yuen	15	3	3	9	12	35	−23	12	Qualification for the Mulan League Cup quarterfinals
6	Kaohsiung Sunny Bank	15	1	2	12	9	37	−28	5	Qualification for the Mulan League Cup quarterfinals

(C) Champions

==== Results by round ====
Round	1	2	3	4	5	6	7	8	9	10	11	12	13	14	15
Result	W	L	W	L	W	W	W	W	W	L	W	W	W	L	W
Position	1	4	3	3	3	3	3	3	2	2	2	2	2	2	2

W = Win; D = Draw; L = Loss

==== Matches ====
11 April 2020 1	Taichung Blue Whale	5–1	Kaohsiung Sunny Bank	Taipei
10:00 (UTC+8)	Hou Fang-wei 3'; Lee Hsiu-chin 55'; Pao Hsin-hsuan 69', 73'; Lai Li-chin 71'	Recap	Lan Yu-chieh 43'	Stadium: Taipei Municipal Stadium; Attendance: 0

25 April 2020 2	Taichung Blue Whale	0–1	Taipei Bravo	Taichung
16:00 (UTC+8)		Recap	Chu Ya-chen 3'	Stadium: Taiyuan Football Field; Attendance: 0

2 May 2020 3	New Taipei Hang Yuen	1–3	Taichung Blue Whale	Hualien
10:00 (UTC+8)	Chen Ying-hui 83' (pen.)	Recap	Pao Hsin-hsuan 7'; Nien Ching-yun 13'; Chang Chi-lan 28'	Stadium: Hualien Stadium; Attendance: 0

9 May 2020 4	Taichung Blue Whale	2–3	Hualien	Kaohsiung
13:00 (UTC+8)	Lee Hsiu-chin 27', 80'	Recap	Wu Shih-ping 5'; Tan Wen-lin 15'; Zhuo Li-ping 63'	Stadium: National Stadium; Attendance: 0

16 May 2020 5	Inter Taoyuan	2–5	Taichung Blue Whale	Taoyuan
16:30 (UTC+8)	Tseng Yun-ya 56'; Yang Ya-han 84'	Recap	Pao Hsin-hsuan 9', 26' (pen.), 83'; Lee Hsiu-chin 39'; Hou Fang-wei 80'	Stadium: National Taiwan Sport University; Attendance: 0

23 May 2020 6	New Taipei Hang Yuen	0–5	Taichung Blue Whale	Hualien
14:00 (UTC+8)		Recap	Hou Fang-wei 1'; Lee Hsiu-chin 18'; Pao Hsin-hsuan 31', 72'; Lai Wei-ju 53'	Stadium: Hualien Stadium; Attendance: 0

30 May 2020 7	Taichung Blue Whale	3–1	Inter Taoyuan	Taichung
16:30 (UTC+8)	Lee Hsiu-chin 4', 45+1'; Pao Hsin-hsuan 65'	Recap	Yang Ya-han 34' (pen.)	Stadium: Taiyuan Football Field

13 June 2020 8	Taipei Bravo	1–2	Taichung Blue Whale	Kaohsiung
14:00 (UTC+8)	Lin Hsin-hui 19'	Recap	Lee Hsiu-chin 42'; Pao Hsin-hsuan 45+3'	Stadium: National Stadium

27 June 2020 9	Taichung Blue Whale	6–0	Kaohsiung Sunny Bank	Taipei
10:00 (UTC+8)	Lee Hsiu-chin 4'; Pao Hsin-hsuan 8'; Tanaka 54'; Lin Yueh-ju 61' (o.g.); Hsieh Cheng-ya 85'; Lai Li-chin 89'	Recap		Stadium: Taipei Municipal Stadium

11 July 2020 10	Hualien	5–2	Taichung Blue Whale	Hualien
16:30 (UTC+8)	Wu Shih-ping 11', 61'; Chen Ya-hui 45+7'; Lin Kai-ling 63'; Zhuo Li-ping 88'	Report	Pao Hsin-hsuan 32' (pen.), 72'	Stadium: Hualien Stadium

22 August 2020 11	Inter Taoyuan	0–2	Taichung Blue Whale	Taoyuan
16:30 (UTC+8)		Recap	Pao Hsin-hsuan 47', 58'	Stadium: National Taiwan Sport University

29 August 2020 12	Taichung Blue Whale	2–1	Taipei Bravo	New Taipei
14:00 (UTC+8)	Lai Wei-ju 2'; Lai Li-chin 38'	Recap	Su Hsin-yun 54'	Stadium: Fu Jen Catholic University; Referee: Wang Chieh

5 September 2020 13	Taichung Blue Whale	4–2	Kaohsiung Sunny Bank	Taoyuan
14:00 (UTC+8)	Pao Hsin-hsuan 26', 38'; Lee Hsiu-chin 52', 53'	Recap	Kuo Tzu-er 59'; Wu Kai-ching 67'	Stadium: National Taiwan Sport University; Referee: Peng Huan-hsuan

12 September 2020 14	Taichung Blue Whale	1–2	Hualien	New Taipei
14:00 (UTC+8)	Chan Pi-han 90+5'	Recap	Lin Kai-ling 43'; Chen Ya-hui 71'	Stadium: Fu Jen Catholic University; Referee: Lin Te-en

19 September 2020 15	Taichung Blue Whale	6–2	New Taipei Hang Yuen	Kaohsiung
10:00 (UTC+8)	Pao Hsin-hsuan 6' (pen.), 63', 65', 85'; Nien Ching-yun 88'; Hou Fang-wei 90+3'	Recap	Liu Yi-fang 16'; Wang Hsin-tsu 75'	Stadium: National Stadium; Referee: Chen Pei-chen

=== Mulan League Cup ===
31 October 2020 Semi-finals	Taichung Blue Whale	2–1	Taipei Bravo	Hualien
13:00 (UTC+8)	Pao Hsin-hsuan 81' (pen.); Nien Ching-yun 82'	Recap	Liang Kai-jou 61'	Stadium: Hualien Stadium; Referee: Chuang En-yi

7 November 2020 Finals	Hualien	1–0	Taichung Blue Whale	Taipei
14:30 (UTC+8)	Wu Shih-ping 52'	Recap		Stadium: Taipei Municipal Stadium; Referee: Yang Shu-ting

== Statistics ==
=== Goalscorers ===
Rank	No.	Pos.	Nat.	Player	TMFL	MLC	Total
1	5	FW	(Chinese Taipei)	Pao Hsin-hsuan	21	1	22
2	10	FW	(Chinese Taipei)	Lee Hsiu-chin	11	0	11
3	16	MF	(Chinese Taipei)	Hou Fang-wei	4	0	4
4	11	FW	(Chinese Taipei)	Lai Li-chin	3	0	3
4	3	FW	(Chinese Taipei)	Nien Ching-yun	2	1	3
6	4	DF	(Chinese Taipei)	Lai Wei-ju	2	0	2
7	2	MF	(Chinese Taipei)	Chang Chi-lan	1	0	1
7	8	MF	(Chinese Taipei)	Hsieh Cheng-ya	1	0	1
7	17	MF	(Chinese Taipei)	Chan Pi-han	1	0	1
7	21	MF	(Japan)	Maho Tanaka	1	0	1
Own goals (from the opponents)					1	0	1
Totals					48	2	50

=== Hat-tricks ===
Player	Against	Result	Date	Competition	Ref
(Chinese Taipei) Pao Hsin-hsuan	Inter Taoyuan	5–2	16 May 2020	Taiwan Mulan Football League	
(Chinese Taipei) Pao Hsin-hsuan	New Taipei Hang Yuen	6–2	19 September 2020	Taiwan Mulan Football League	

=== Cleansheets ===
Rank	No.	Nat.	Player	TMFL	MLC	Total
1	1	(Chinese Taipei)	Chen Miao-wen	2	–	2
2	18	(Chinese Taipei)	Lin Yi-han	1	–	1
3	18	(Chinese Taipei)	Chou Yu-shan	0	–	0
3	25	(Chinese Taipei)	Wu Fang-yu	0	–	0
3	24	(Hong Kong)	Ng Cheuk Wai	–	0	0
Totals				3	0	3

== Awards ==
Player	Position	Award	Ref.
(Chinese Taipei) Pao Hsin-hsuan	Forward	Golden Boot	
