= 2024 Taichung Blue Whale season =

Taichung Blue Whale
2024 season
- Head coach: Lu Kuei-hua
- Stadium: Taiyuan Football Field
- TMFL: 2nd
- AWCL: Quarter-finals
- Top goalscorer: League: Saowalak Peng-ngam (9); All: Saowalak Peng-ngam (9)
- Biggest win: Taichung Blue Whale 4–0 Odisha
- Biggest defeat: Taichung Blue Whale 0–3 Kaohsiung Attackers

The 2024 Taichung Blue Whale season is the club's 11th season and their 11th season in Taiwan Mulan Football League. The club also participated in the 2024–25 AFC Women's Champions League as the 2023 Taiwan Mulan Football League champions.

== Kits ==
- Supplier: MIE Jersey
- Main Sponsor: Skechers

== Players ==
N	Pos.	Nat.	Name	Age.	Since
Goalkeepers
1	GK	(Chinese Taipei)	Tsai Ming-jung (captain)	35	2022
8	GK	(Chinese Taipei)	Cheng Ssu-yu	35	2024
25	GK	(Chinese Taipei)	Wu Fang-yu	19	2024
26	GK	(Thailand)	Waraporn Boonsing	34	2024
Defenders
3	DF	(Chinese Taipei)	Shen Yen-chun	25	2020
5	DF	(Chinese Taipei)	Huang Ke-sin	21	2024
7	DF	(Chinese Taipei)	Pan Shin-yu	27	2020
12	DF	(Chinese Taipei)	Wu Yu	26	2018
20	DF	(Chinese Taipei)	Chen Tzu-chen	26	2023
22	DF	(Chinese Taipei)	Li Pei-jung	24	2019
Midfielders
2	MF	(Chinese Taipei)	Chang Chi-lan	28	2014
6	MF	(Thailand)	Silawan Intamee	30	2022
14	MF	(Japan)	Maho Tanaka	23	2019
15	MF	(Chinese Taipei)	Lin Ya-hsuan	21	2024
16	MF	(Chinese Taipei)	Chen Jin-wen	21	2022
19	MF	(Thailand)	Pitsamai Sornsai	35	2021
21	MF	(Chinese Taipei)	Huang Hui-shan	16	2024
23	MF	(Chinese Taipei)	Liu Chien-yun	32	2014
24	MF	(Chinese Taipei)	Lin Yu-syuan	21	2022
27	MF	(Chinese Taipei)	Lee Yi-hsuan	18	2024
30	MF	(Chinese Taipei)	Wu Ya-yu	17	2023
Forwards
9	FW	(Chinese Taipei)	Nien Ching-yun	22	2020
13	FW	(Thailand)	Saowalak Peng-ngam	28	2023
17	MF	(Chinese Taipei)	Lin Jing-xuan	19	2024
18	FW	(Chinese Taipei)	Chiang Tzu-shan	21	2022
28	FW	(Chinese Taipei)	Lin Chia-ying	17	2024
29	FW	(Chinese Taipei)	Liao Jie-ning		2024

- Ordered by squad number.

== Transfers ==
=== In ===
No.	Pos.	Player	Transferred from	Source
Preseason
5	DF	Huang Ke-sin	(Chinese Taipei) Hualien	
15	MF	Lin Ya-hsuan	(Chinese Taipei) Hualien	
17	FW	Lin Jing-xuan	(Chinese Taipei) Hualien	
25	GK	Wu Fang-yu	(Chinese Taipei) Hui Wen High School	
27	MF	Lee Yi-hsuan	(Chinese Taipei) Kaohsiung Sunny Bank	
28	FW	Lin Chia-ying	(Chinese Taipei) Hui Wen High School	
Midseason
8	GK	Cheng Ssu-yu	(Chinese Taipei) NTUS	
21	MF	Huang Hui-shan	(Chinese Taipei) Hui Wen High School	
26	GK	Waraporn Boonsing	—	
29	FW	Liao Jie-ning	—	

=== Out ===
No.	Pos.	Player	Transferred to	Source
Preseason
4	DF	Phornphirun Philawan	(Thailand) College of Asian Scholars	
8	DF	Wang Shu-wen	—	
11	FW	Lai Li-chin	(Chinese Taipei) NTUS	
15	FW	Chang Yu-chiao	—	
17	DF	Sung Yu-ting	(Chinese Taipei) NTUS	
20	FW	Chien Hsuan-ying	(Chinese Taipei) AC Taipei	
26	GK	Cho Yun-chen	—	
27	FW	Li Yong-shan	(Chinese Taipei) Hui Wen High School	
Midseason
26	GK	Shih Yung-chen	—	

== Preseason and friendlies ==
19 July 2024 Sunny Bank International Invitation	Taichung Blue Whale (Chinese Taipei)	2–0	(Japan) Grano Isesaki	Kaohsiung
15:30 (UTC+8)				Stadium: Kaohsiung Nanzih Football Stadium

21 July 2024 Sunny Bank International Invitation	Kaohsiung Attackers (Chinese Taipei)	1–3	(Chinese Taipei) Taichung Blue Whale	Kaohsiung
18:30 (UTC+8)	Lu Meng-fang 32'	Recap	Intamee 57'; Peng-ngam 72'; Tanaka 80+3'	Stadium: Kaohsiung Nanzih Football Stadium; Referee: Wang Chieh

== Competitions ==
=== Overall record ===
Competition	First match	Last match	Starting round	Final position	Record							
Competition	First match	Last match	Starting round	Final position	Pld	W	D	L	GF	GA	GD	Win %
Taiwan Mulan Football League	13 April 2024	23 November 2024	Matchday 1	2nd	15	9	3	3	28	15	+13	60.00
AFC Women's Champions League	6 October 2024	23 March 2025	Group stage	Quarter-finals	3	1	0	2	5	5	+0	33.33
Total					18	10	3	5	33	20	+13	55.56

Source: TMFLAWCL

=== Taiwan Mulan Football League ===
==== League table ====
Pos	Team	Pld	W	D	L	GF	GA	GD	Pts	Qualification or relegation
1	Kaohsiung Attackers	15	10	4	1	23	6	+17	34	Qualification for the AFC Women's Champions League
2	Taichung Blue Whale	15	9	3	3	28	15	+13	30	
3	New Taipei Hang Yuen	15	9	2	4	29	12	+17	29	
4	Taipei Bravo	15	5	2	8	15	20	−5	17	
5	Hualien	15	2	3	10	7	27	−20	9	
6	Mars	15	2	2	11	11	33	−22	8	

==== Results by round ====
Round	1	2	3	4	5	6	7	8	9	10	11	12	14	15	13^{1}
Result	D	D	L	W	W	W	D	W	W	L	W	W	L	W	W
Position	2	2	5	4	2	1	2	2	2	2	2	1	3	2	2

W = Win; D = Draw; L = Loss

^{1} Matchday 13 was postponed to 23 November 2024 due to the AFC Women's Champions League.

==== Matches ====
13 April 2024 1	New Taipei Hang Yuen	1–1	Taichung Blue Whale	New Taipei
16:00 (UTC+8)	Lee Yi-wen (yellow card) 10'; Teng Pei-ling (yellow card) 58'; Matsunaga 63'	Report	Intamee 17'	Stadium: Fu Jen Catholic University; Attendance: 92; Referee: Yang Shu-ting

27 April 2024 2	Taichung Blue Whale	1–1	Mars	Taichung
16:00 (UTC+8)	Lin Jing-xuan 11'	Report	Yang Hsiao-chuan 89'	Stadium: Taiyuan Football Field; Attendance: 123; Referee: Yang Chang-pei

11 May 2024 3	Taichung Blue Whale	0–2	Kaohsiung Attackers	Hualien
15:00 (UTC+8)		Report	Hoekstra 45+2', 83'; Liang Kai-jou (yellow card) 88'	Stadium: Hualien Stadium; Attendance: 46; Referee: Lin Chien

18 May 2024 4	Taipei Bravo	2–3	Taichung Blue Whale	Taichung
16:00 (UTC+8)	Cheng Ya-chih 1'; Chou Chieh-ni 31'	Report	Liu Chien-yun 50'; Peng-ngam 54'; Tanaka 74'	Stadium: Taiyuan Football Field; Attendance: 151; Referee: Wang Chieh

25 May 2024 5	Taichung Blue Whale	3–0	Hualien	Taichung
16:00 (UTC+8)	Intamee 10'; Peng-ngam 89'; Tanaka 90+3'	Report		Stadium: Taiyuan Football Field; Attendance: 176; Referee: Yang Shu-ting

15 June 2024 6	Mars	1–4	Taichung Blue Whale	Kaohsiung
15:30 (UTC+8)	Kao Hsin 74'	Report	Lin Ya-hsuan 10'; Peng-ngam 44', 48' (pen.); Intamee 59'	Stadium: Kaohsiung Nanzih Football Stadium; Attendance: 52; Referee: Wang Chieh

22 June 2024 7	Kaohsiung Attackers	1–1	Taichung Blue Whale	Kaohsiung
18:00 (UTC+8)	Chan Pi-han (yellow card) 14'; Wakabayashi 85'	Report	Huang Ke-sin 71'; Sornsai (yellow card) 76'	Stadium: Kaohsiung Nanzih Football Stadium; Attendance: 402; Referee: Chen Hsiao-en

29 June 2024 8	Taipei Bravo	0–1	Taichung Blue Whale	Taipei
19:00 (UTC+8)	Ting Chia-ying (yellow card) 19'; Hsu Yi-yun (yellow card) 49'	Report	Lin Yu-syuan 27'	Stadium: Taipei Municipal Stadium; Attendance: 141; Referee: Lin Chien

17 August 2024 9	Hualien	1–3	Taichung Blue Whale	Hualien
18:00 (UTC+8)	Lin Kai-ling 15'	Report	Peng-ngam 10', 56'; Chen Jin-wen 53'	Stadium: Hualien Stadium; Referee: Lee Kuan-ting

21 September 2024 11	Taichung Blue Whale	3–0	Hualien	Taichung
16:00 (UTC+8)	Tanaka 10'; Peng-ngam 19'; Chen Jin-wen 54'	Report		Stadium: Taiyuan Football Field; Referee: Yang Chang-pei

28 September 2024 12	Taichung Blue Whale	3–0	New Taipei Hang Yuen	Taichung
16:00 (UTC+8)	Peng-ngam 3'; Huang Ke-sin 34'; Chiang Tzu-shan 45+3'	Report		Stadium: Taiyuan Football Field; Referee: Huang Chi-jui

2 November 2024 14	Taichung Blue Whale	0–3	Kaohsiung Attackers	Taoyuan
15:00 (UTC+8)		Report	Uetsuji 23', 81'; Hoekstra 90+3'	Stadium: National Taiwan Sport University; Referee: Kao Jung-fang

9 November 2024 15	Taipei Bravo	1–3	Taichung Blue Whale	Kaohsiung
15:00 (UTC+8)	Hsu Yi-yun 22'	Report	Liu Chien-yun 59'; Chen Jin-wen 71'; Lin Ya-hsuan 82'	Stadium: Kaohsiung Nanzih Football Stadium; Referee: Wang Chieh

16 November 2024 10	New Taipei Hang Yuen	2–1	Taichung Blue Whale	New Taipei
15:00 (UTC+8)	Tanaka 30'; Teng Pei-lin 75'	Report	Peng-ngam 58'	Stadium: Fu Jen Catholic University; Referee: Lee Tsung-ying

23 November 2024 13	Taichung Blue Whale	1–0	Mars	Taichung
15:30 (UTC+8)	Chen Jin-wen 49'	Report		Stadium: Taiyuan Football Field; Referee: Yang Chang-pei

=== AFC Women's Champions League ===
==== Group stage ====
Pos	Team	Pld	W	D	L	GF	GA	GD	Pts	Qualification
1	(Japan) Urawa Red Diamonds (Q)	3	3	0	0	21	0	+21	9	Quarterfinals
2	(Vietnam) Hồ Chí Minh City (H, Q)	3	2	0	1	6	4	+2	6	Quarterfinals
3	(Chinese Taipei) Taichung Blue Whale (Q)	3	1	0	2	5	5	0	3	Possible Quarterfinals
4	(India) Odisha	3	0	0	3	1	24	−23	0	

Source: AFC
(H) Hosts; (Q) Qualified for the phase indicated

6 October 2024 1	Hồ Chí Minh City (Vietnam)	3–1	(Chinese Taipei) Taichung Blue Whale	Ho Chi Minh City
19:00 (UTC+7)	Nguyễn Thị Tuyết Ngân 50'; Huỳnh Như 65', 67'	Report	Huang Ke-sin 85'	Stadium: Thống Nhất Stadium; Attendance: 1,086; Referee: Chan Khin Nyein (Myanmar)

9 October 2024 2	Taichung Blue Whale (Chinese Taipei)	0–2	(Japan) Urawa Red Diamonds	Ho Chi Minh City
15:00 (UTC+7)	Chang Chi-lan (yellow card) 90+4'	Report	Shiokoshi 56' (pen.); Tanno 70'	Stadium: Thống Nhất Stadium; Attendance: 162; Referee: Tian Jin (China)

12 October 2024 3	Taichung Blue Whale (Chinese Taipei)	4–0	(India) Odisha	Ho Chi Minh City
15:00 (UTC+7)	Chen Jin-wen 42', 69'; Tanaka 45'; Intamee 57'	Report	Ibrahim (yellow card) 79'	Stadium: Thống Nhất Stadium; Attendance: 135; Referee: Edita Mirabidova (Uzbekistan)

== Statistics ==
=== Squad statistics ===
No.	Pos	Nat	Player	Total		TMFL		AWCL	
No.	Pos	Nat	Player	Apps	Goals	Apps	Goals	Apps	Goals
Goalkeepers
1	GK	(Chinese Taipei) TPE	Tsai Ming-jung	16	0	13	0	3	0
8	GK	(Chinese Taipei) TPE	Cheng Ssu-yu	0	0	0	0	0	0
25	GK	(Chinese Taipei) TPE	Wu Fang-yu	3	0	1+2	0	0	0
26	GK	(Thailand) THA	Waraporn Boonsing	2	0	1+1	0	0	0
Defenders
3	DF	(Chinese Taipei) TPE	Shen Yen-chun	7	0	4+2	0	1	0
5	DF	(Chinese Taipei) TPE	Huang Ke-sin	17	3	14	2	3	1
7	DF	(Chinese Taipei) TPE	Pan Shin-yu	15	0	12+1	0	2	0
12	DF	(Chinese Taipei) TPE	Wu Yu	6	0	1+4	0	1	0
20	DF	(Chinese Taipei) TPE	Chen Tzu-chen	8	0	4+3	0	1	0
22	DF	(Chinese Taipei) TPE	Li Pei-jung	17	0	13+1	0	3	0
Midfielders
2	MF	(Chinese Taipei) TPE	Chang Chi-lan	15	0	8+4	0	2+1	0
6	MF	(Thailand) THA	Silawan Intamee	18	4	14+1	3	2+1	1
14	MF	(Japan) JPN	Maho Tanaka	16	4	8+6	3	2	1
15	MF	(Chinese Taipei) TPE	Lin Ya-hsuan	15	2	9+3	2	2+1	0
16	MF	(Chinese Taipei) TPE	Chen Jin-wen	16	6	8+5	4	2+1	2
19	MF	(Thailand) THA	Pitsamai Sornsai	17	0	12+2	0	3	0
21	MF	(Chinese Taipei) TPE	Huang Hui-shan	2	0	0+2	0	0	0
23	MF	(Chinese Taipei) TPE	Liu Chien-yun	13	2	7+3	2	3	0
24	MF	(Chinese Taipei) TPE	Lin Yu-syuan	11	1	8+1	1	0+2	0
27	MF	(Chinese Taipei) TPE	Lee Yi-hsuan	1	0	1	0	0	0
30	MF	(Chinese Taipei) TPE	Wu Ya-yu	1	0	0+1	0	0	0
Forwards
9	FW	(Chinese Taipei) TPE	Nien Ching-yun	12	0	2+8	0	0+2	0
13	FW	(Thailand) THA	Saowalak Peng-ngam	14	9	11+1	9	1+1	0
17	FW	(Chinese Taipei) TPE	Lin Jing-xuan	14	1	5+6	1	1+2	0
18	FW	(Chinese Taipei) TPE	Chiang Tzu-shan	15	1	9+5	1	1	0
28	FW	(Chinese Taipei) TPE	Lin Chia-ying	2	0	0+1	0	0+1	0
29	FW	(Chinese Taipei) TPE	Liao Jie-ning	4	0	0+3	0	0+1	0
Own goals (0)

=== Goalscorers ===
Rank	No.	Pos.	Nat.	Player	TMFL	AWCL	Total
1	13	FW	(Thailand)	Saowalak Peng-ngam	9	0	9
2	16	MF	(Chinese Taipei)	Chen Jin-wen	4	2	6
3	6	MF	(Thailand)	Silawan Intamee	3	1	4
3	14	MF	(Japan)	Maho Tanaka	3	1	4
5	5	DF	(Chinese Taipei)	Huang Ke-sin	2	1	3
6	15	MF	(Chinese Taipei)	Lin Ya-hsuan	2	0	2
6	23	MF	(Chinese Taipei)	Liu Chien-yun	2	0	2
8	17	FW	(Chinese Taipei)	Lin Jing-xuan	1	0	1
8	18	FW	(Chinese Taipei)	Chiang Tzu-shan	1	0	1
8	24	MF	(Chinese Taipei)	Lin Yu-syuan	1	0	1
Totals					28	5	33

=== Cleansheets ===
Rank	No.	Nat.	Player	TMFL	AWCL	Total
1	1	(Chinese Taipei)	Tsai Ming-jung	4	1	5
2	25	(Chinese Taipei)	Wu Fang-yu	1	—	1
2	26	(Thailand)	Waraporn Boonsing	1	—	1
4	8	(Chinese Taipei)	Cheng Ssu-yu	—	—	0
4	26	(Chinese Taipei)	Shih Yung-chen	—	—	0
Totals				6	1	7

=== Disciplinary record ===
No.	Pos.	Nat.	Name	TMFL			AWCL			Total		
No.	Pos.	Nat.	Name	Booked	(yellow card) (yellow-red card)	Sent off (straight red)	Booked	(yellow card) (yellow-red card)	Sent off (straight red)	Booked	(yellow card) (yellow-red card)	Sent off (straight red)
2	MF	(Chinese Taipei)	Chang Chi-lan				1			1		
19	MF	(Thailand)	Pitsamai Sornsai	1						1		
Totals				1			1			2		

Ordered by (red card) , (second yellow card) and (yellow card)
(yellow card) = Number of bookings; (second yellow card) = Number of sending offs after a second yellow card; (red card) = Number of sending offs by a direct red card.
