= 2016 AFC Women's Olympic Qualifying Tournament =

Tournament details
- Host countries: Myanmar (First round Group A and Second round); Jordan (First round Group B); Republic of China (Taiwan) (First round Group C); Japan (Final round)
- Dates: 11 March 2015 – 9 March 2016
- Teams: 18 (from 1 confederation)

Final positions
- Champions: Australia (1st title)
- Runners-up: China
- Third place: Japan
- Fourth place: South Korea

Tournament statistics
- Matches played: 37
- Goals scored: 128 (3.46 per match)
- Attendance: 86,204 (2,330 per match)
- Top scorer: (Myanmar) Khin Moe Wai (9 goals)

The 2016 AFC Women's Olympic Qualifying Tournament was the 4th edition of the AFC Women's Olympic Qualifying Tournament, the quadrennial international football competition organised by the Asian Football Confederation (AFC) to determine which women's national teams from Asia qualify for the Olympic football tournament.

The top two teams of the tournament qualified for the 2016 Summer Olympics women's football tournament in Brazil as the AFC representatives.

On 7 March 2016, with one round of matches remaining to be played, Australia and China were confirmed qualification to the Olympics.

== Teams ==
A total of 18 AFC member national teams entered the qualifying stage. The format is as follows:

- First round: The highest-ranked seven teams based on the FIFA Women's World Rankings at the time of the draw received byes. Teams ranked in the top five – Japan, Australia, North Korea, China PR, and South Korea – received byes to the final round, while teams ranked sixth and seventh – Thailand and Vietnam – received byes to the second round. The remaining 11 teams were drawn into two groups of four teams and one group of three teams, with the teams seeded according to their FIFA Rankings. In each group, teams played each other once at a centralised venue. The three group winners advanced to the second round.
- Second round: The five teams (two teams who entered this round and the three winners from the first round) played each other once at a centralised venue. The winner advanced to the final round.
- Final round: The six teams (five teams who entered this round and the winner from the second round) played each other once at a centralised venue. The top two teams qualified for the Olympic football tournament.

The draw for the qualifiers was held on 4 December 2014 at the AFC House in Kuala Lumpur, Malaysia.

Teams entering final round	Teams entering second round	Teams entering first round			
Teams entering final round	Teams entering second round	Pot 1	Pot 2	Pot 3	Pot 4
Australia; China; Japan; North Korea; South Korea	Thailand; Vietnam	Chinese Taipei; Myanmar; Uzbekistan	India; Iran; Jordan	Bahrain; Hong Kong; Laos	Palestine; Sri Lanka

Did not enter

Afghanistan
Bangladesh
Bhutan
Brunei
Cambodia
Guam
Indonesia
Iraq
Kyrgyzstan
Kuwait
Lebanon
Macau^{1}
Malaysia
Maldives
Mongolia
Nepal
Northern Mariana Islands^{1}
Oman
Pakistan
Philippines
Qatar
Saudi Arabia
Singapore
Syria
Tajikistan
Timor-Leste
Turkmenistan
United Arab Emirates
Yemen

Notes
^{1} Non-IOC member, ineligible for Olympics.

== Schedule ==
The schedule of the qualifying stage was as follows.

Round	Date
First round	11–15 March 2015 (Groups A and B); 20–24 March 2015 (Group C)
Second round	14–22 September 2015
Final round	29 February – 9 March 2016

== First round ==
=== Group A ===
- All matches were held in Myanmar.
- Times listed were UTC+6:30.

Pos	Team	Pld	W	D	L	GF	GA	GD	Pts	Qualification
1	Myanmar (H)	2	2	0	0	23	0	+23	6	Second round
2	India	2	1	0	1	4	7	−3	3	
3	Sri Lanka	2	0	0	2	0	20	−20	0	
4	Bahrain	0	0	0	0	0	0	0	0	Withdrew

Source: AFC
(H) Hosts
11 March 2015
17:00

Sri Lanka	0–16	Myanmar
	Report	Naw Ar Lo Wer Phaw 2', 4', 40'; Khin Moe Wai 6', 16', 20', 21', 26'; Sewwandi 18' (o.g.); Win Theingi Tun 23', 28', 49', 77', 90+1'; Yee Yee Oo 48', 51'

Mandalarthiri Stadium, Mandalay
Attendance: 5,456
Referee: Law Bik Chi (Hong Kong)

13 March 2015
17:00

India	4–0	Sri Lanka
K. Devi 12'; A. Devi 16'; Madushani 48' (o.g.); R. Devi 58'	Report

Mandalarthiri Stadium, Mandalay
Attendance: 839
Referee: Nami Imaizumi (Japan)

15 March 2015
17:00

Myanmar	7–0	India
Khin Moe Wai 8'; Khin Marlar Tun 15', 61'; Naw Ar Lo Wer Phaw 21'; Yee Yee Oo 28', 77'; Win Theingi Tun 90+2'	Report

Mandalarthiri Stadium, Mandalay
Attendance: 5,003
Referee: Pannipar Kamnueng (Thailand)

=== Group B ===
- All matches were held in Jordan.
- Times listed were UTC+2.

Pos	Team	Pld	W	D	L	GF	GA	GD	Pts	Qualification
1	Jordan (H)	3	3	0	0	9	0	+9	9	Second round
2	Uzbekistan	3	2	0	1	7	2	+5	6	
3	Hong Kong	3	0	1	2	2	4	−2	1	
4	Palestine	3	0	1	2	2	14	−12	1	

Source: AFC
(H) Hosts
11 March 2015
12:00

Uzbekistan	6–0	Palestine
Sarikova 7'; Nazarova 9'; Riskieva 12'; Turdiboeva 14'; Abdurasulova 22'; Kudratova 63'	Report

Petra Stadium, Amman
Attendance: 100
Referee: Kate Jacewicz (Australia)
11 March 2015
16:00

Jordan	1–0	Hong Kong
Jbarah 8'	Report

Petra Stadium, Amman
Attendance: 400
Referee: Fusako Kajiyama (Japan)

13 March 2015
12:00

Hong Kong	0–1	Uzbekistan
	Report	Riskieva 75'

Petra Stadium, Amman
Attendance: 100
Referee: Park Ji-yeong (South Korea)
13 March 2015
15:00

Palestine	0–6	Jordan
	Report	Jebreen 20'; Jbarah 27', 38', 60'; Al-Naber 33', 53'

Petra Stadium, Amman
Attendance: 500
Referee: Maria Rebello (India)

15 March 2015
12:00

Hong Kong	2–2	Palestine
Chan Wing Sze 16', 33'	Report	Shahine 39'; Salama 52'

Petra Stadium, Amman
Attendance: 100
Referee: Fusako Kajiyama (Japan)
15 March 2015
16:00

Uzbekistan	0–2	Jordan
	Report	Al-Naber 76' (pen.); Al-Masri 82'

Petra Stadium, Amman
Attendance: 800
Referee: Kate Jacewicz (Australia)

=== Group C ===
- All matches were held in Taiwan.
- Times listed were UTC+8.

Pos	Team	Pld	W	D	L	GF	GA	GD	Pts	Qualification
1	Chinese Taipei (H)	2	2	0	0	5	0	+5	6	Second round
2	Iran	2	1	0	1	5	2	+3	3	
3	Laos	2	0	0	2	1	9	−8	0	

Source: AFC
(H) Hosts
20 March 2015
19:00

Laos	0–4	Chinese Taipei
	Report	Yu Hsiu-chin 11'; Lai Li-chin 43'; Lin Ya-han 81'; Lee Hsiu-chin 90+3'

Taipei Municipal Stadium, Taipei
Attendance: 1,200
Referee: Anna Sidorova (Uzbekistan)

22 March 2015
19:00

Iran	5–1	Laos
Behesht 30', 62'; Karimi 35'; Norouzi 77'; Arjangi 88' (pen.)	Report	Phayvanh 33'

Taipei Municipal Stadium, Taipei
Attendance: 150
Referee: Wang Jia (China)

24 March 2015
19:00

Chinese Taipei	1–0	Iran
Lee Hsiu-chin 44'	Report

Taipei Municipal Stadium, Taipei
Attendance: 2,000
Referee: Mai Hoàng Trang (Vietnam)

== Second round ==
- All matches were held in Myanmar.
- Times listed were UTC+6:30.

Pos	Team	Pld	W	D	L	GF	GA	GD	Pts	Qualification
1	Vietnam	4	3	0	1	8	4	+4	9	Final round
2	Chinese Taipei	4	2	1	1	5	3	+2	7	
3	Thailand	4	2	1	1	3	3	0	7	
4	Myanmar (H)	4	2	0	2	8	7	+1	6	
5	Jordan	4	0	0	4	1	8	−7	0	

Source: AFC
(H) Hosts
14 September 2015
15:30

Chinese Taipei	1–0	Vietnam
Lin Chiung-ying 85'	Report

Mandalarthiri Stadium, Mandalay
Attendance: 475
Referee: Kim Sook-hee (South Korea)
14 September 2015
18:30

Jordan	0–2	Myanmar
	Report	Khin Moe Wai 17'; Wai Wai Aung 72'

Mandalarthiri Stadium, Mandalay
Attendance: 3,894
Referee: Nami Imaizumi (Japan)

16 September 2015
15:30

Jordan	0–3	Chinese Taipei
	Report	Chan Pi-han 8'; Michelle Pao 45'; Yasmeen Khair 58' (o.g.)

Mandalarthiri Stadium, Mandalay
Attendance: 736
Referee: Saltanat Noroozi (Iran)
16 September 2015
18:30

Myanmar	1–2	Thailand
San San Maw 73'	Report	Anootsara 34', 69'

Mandalarthiri Stadium, Mandalay
Attendance: 22,050
Referee: Casey Reibelt (Australia)

18 September 2015
15:30

Thailand	1–0	Jordan
Anootsara 30'	Report

Mandalarthiri Stadium, Mandalay
Attendance: 340
Referee: Wang Jia (China)
18 September 2015
18:30

Vietnam	4–2	Myanmar
Huỳnh Như 16', 74'; Nguyễn Thị Minh Nguyệt 22', 45+1' (pen.)	Report	Wai Wai Aung 85'; Khin Moe Wai 88'

Mandalarthiri Stadium, Mandalay
Attendance: 7,485
Referee: Kim Sook-hee (South Korea)

20 September 2015
15:30

Vietnam	2–1	Jordan
Nguyễn Thị Minh Nguyệt 18' (pen.), 45+1'	Report	Jbarah 76'

Mandalarthiri Stadium, Mandalay
Attendance: 115
Referee: Nami Imaizumi (Japan)
20 September 2015
18:30

Chinese Taipei	0–0	Thailand
	Report

Mandalarthiri Stadium, Mandalay
Attendance: 216
Referee: Casey Reibelt (Australia)

22 September 2015
15:30

Thailand	0–2	Vietnam
	Report	Nguyễn Thị Minh Nguyệt 39', 83'

Mandalarthiri Stadium, Mandalay
Attendance: 276
Referee: Wang Jia (China)
22 September 2015
18:30

Myanmar	3–1	Chinese Taipei
Khin Moe Wai 67'; Than Than Htwe 79'; Lin Kai-ling 83' (o.g.)	Report	Lee Hsiu-chin 90+1'

Mandalarthiri Stadium, Mandalay
Attendance: 1,427
Referee: Nami Imaizumi (Japan)

== Final round ==
- All matches were held in Japan.
- Times listed were UTC+9.

Pos	Team	Pld	W	D	L	GF	GA	GD	Pts	Qualification
1	Australia	5	4	1	0	17	3	+14	13	2016 Summer Olympics
2	China	5	3	2	0	7	3	+4	11	2016 Summer Olympics
3	Japan (H)	5	2	1	2	10	7	+3	7	
4	South Korea	5	1	2	2	6	5	+1	5	
5	North Korea	5	1	2	2	4	5	−1	5	
6	Vietnam	5	0	0	5	1	22	−21	0	

Source: AFC
(H) Hosts
29 February 2016
16:35

China	2–0	Vietnam
Gu Yasha 57'; Zhang Rui 63' (pen.)	Report

Nagai Stadium, Osaka
Attendance: 369
Referee: Lucila Montes (Mexico)
29 February 2016
19:35

North Korea	1–1	South Korea
Kim Un-ju 80'	Report	Jung Seol-bin 32'

Nagai Stadium, Osaka
Attendance: 2,000
Referee: Stéphanie Frappart (France)
29 February 2016
19:39

Australia	3–1	Japan
De Vanna 25'; Heyman 41'; Gorry 78'	Report	Ōgimi 45+2'

Kincho Stadium, Osaka
Attendance: 4,988
Referee: Carina Vitulano (Italy)

2 March 2016
16:35

Australia	9–0	Vietnam
Gielnik 10'; Simon 17', 38', 43'; Kennedy 19'; Sykes 64'; Van Egmond 68'; Heyman 77'; Polkinghorne 85'	Report

Nagai Stadium, Osaka
Attendance: 129
Referee: Esther Staubli (Switzerland)
2 March 2016
19:35

North Korea	1–1	China
Ra Un-sim 38'	Report	Wang Shuang 90+3' (pen.)

Nagai Stadium, Osaka
Attendance: 463
Referee: Rita Gani (Malaysia)
2 March 2016
19:39

Japan	1–1	South Korea
Iwabuchi 84'	Report	Jung Seol-bin 87'

Kincho Stadium, Osaka
Attendance: 5,605
Referee: Anna-Marie Keighley (New Zealand)

4 March 2016
16:35

Vietnam	0–1	North Korea
	Report	Ju Hyo-sim 90'

Nagai Stadium, Osaka
Attendance: 996
Referee: Abirami Apbai Naidu (Singapore)
4 March 2016
19:35

South Korea	0–2	Australia
	Report	Simon 1'; Van Egmond 14' (pen.)

Nagai Stadium, Osaka
Attendance: 1,149
Referee: Lucila Venegas (Mexico)
4 March 2016
19:39

Japan	1–2	China
Yokoyama 65'	Report	Zhang Rui 14'; Gu Yasha 58'

Kincho Stadium, Osaka
Attendance: 6,959
Referee: Stéphanie Frappart (France)

7 March 2016
16:35

China	1–0	South Korea
Wang Shanshan 43'	Report

Nagai Stadium, Osaka
Attendance: 451
Referee: Carina Vitulano (Italy)
7 March 2016
19:35

North Korea	1–2	Australia
Kim Su-gyong 78'	Report	Heyman 18'; Gorry 84'

Nagai Stadium, Osaka
Attendance: 900
Referee: Anna-Marie Keighley (New Zealand)
7 March 2016
19:39

Vietnam	1–6	Japan
Huỳnh Như 42' (pen.)	Report	Iwabuchi 39'; Ohno 45'; Kawasumi 80'; Nakajima 83'; Yokoyama 90'; Ōgimi 90+3'

Kincho Stadium, Osaka
Attendance: 3,418
Referee: Rita Gani (Malaysia)

9 March 2016
16:35

South Korea	4–0	Vietnam
Lim Seon-joo 8', 18'; Lee Geum-min 69'; Jeon Ga-eul 85'	Report

Nagai Stadium, Osaka
Attendance: 99
Referee: Abirami Apbai Naidu (Singapore)
9 March 2016
19:39

Australia	1–1	China
Van Egmond 85'	Report	Ma Xiaoxu 16'

Nagai Stadium, Osaka
Attendance: 250
Referee: Stéphanie Frappart (France)
9 March 2016
19:39

Japan	1–0	North Korea
Iwabuchi 80'	Report

Kincho Stadium, Osaka
Attendance: 4,766
Referee: Esther Staubli (Switzerland)

== Qualified teams for Olympics ==
The following two teams from AFC qualified for the Olympic football tournament.

Team	Qualified on	Previous appearances in tournament^{1}
Australia	7 March 2016	2 (2000^{2}, 2004^{2})
China	7 March 2016	4 (1996, 2000, 2004, 2008)

^{1} Bold indicates champion for that year. Italic indicates host for that year.
^{2} Australia qualified as a member of the OFC in 2000 and 2004.

== Goalscorers ==
9 goals

- (Myanmar) Khin Moe Wai

6 goals

- (Myanmar) Win Theingi Tun
- (Vietnam) Nguyễn Thị Minh Nguyệt

4 goals

- (Australia) Kyah Simon
- (Jordan) Maysa Jbarah
- (Myanmar) Naw Ar Lo Wer Phaw
- (Myanmar) Yee Yee Oo

3 goals

- (Australia) Michelle Heyman
- (Australia) Emily van Egmond
- (Chinese Taipei) Lee Hsiu-chin
- (Japan) Mana Iwabuchi
- (Jordan) Stephanie Al-Naber
- (Thailand) Anootsara Maijarern
- (Vietnam) Huỳnh Như

2 goals

- (Australia) Katrina Gorry
- (China) Gu Yasha
- (China) Zhang Rui
- (Hong Kong) Chan Wing Sze
- (Iran) Shabnam Behesht
- (Japan) Yūki Ōgimi
- (Japan) Kumi Yokoyama
- (Myanmar) Khin Marlar Tun
- (Myanmar) Wai Wai Aung
- (South Korea) Jung Seol-bin
- (South Korea) Lim Seon-joo
- (Uzbekistan) Kamola Riskieva

1 goal

- (Australia) Lisa De Vanna
- (Australia) Emily Gielnik
- (Australia) Alanna Kennedy
- (Australia) Clare Polkinghorne
- (Australia) Ashleigh Sykes
- (China) Ma Xiaoxu
- (China) Wang Shanshan
- (China) Wang Shuang
- (Chinese Taipei) Chan Pi-han
- (Chinese Taipei) Lai Li-chin
- (Chinese Taipei) Lin Chiung-ying
- (Chinese Taipei) Lin Ya-han
- (Chinese Taipei) Michelle Pao
- (Chinese Taipei) Yu Hsiu-chin
- (India) Loitongbam Ashalata Devi
- (India) Gurumayum Radharani Devi
- (India) Yumnam Kamala Devi
- (Iran) Fatemeh Arjangi
- (Iran) Fereshteh Karimi
- (Iran) Parya Norouzi
- (Japan) Nahomi Kawasumi
- (Japan) Emi Nakajima
- (Japan) Shinobu Ohno
- (Jordan) Luna Al-Masri
- (Jordan) Shahnaz Jebreen
- (Laos) Souphavanh Phayvanh
- (Myanmar) San San Maw
- (Myanmar) Than Than Htwe
- (North Korea) Ju Hyo-sim
- (North Korea) Kim Su-gyong
- (North Korea) Kim Un-ju
- (North Korea) Ra Un-sim
- (Palestine) Kiloudi Salama
- (Palestine) Natali Shaheen
- (South Korea) Jeon Ga-eul
- (South Korea) Lee Geum-min
- (Uzbekistan) Nargiza Abdurasulova
- (Uzbekistan) Nilufar Kudratova
- (Uzbekistan) Zumratjon Nazarova
- (Uzbekistan) Makhliyo Sarikova
- (Uzbekistan) Feruza Turdiboeva

Own goal

- (Jordan) Yasmeen Khair (playing against Chinese Taipei)
- (Sri Lanka) Nisansala Sewwandi (playing against Myanmar)
- (Sri Lanka) Imesha Madushani (playing against India)
- (Chinese Taipei) Lin Kai-ling (playing against Myanmar)

Source: the-afc.com
