= Chan Wing Sze =

Hong Kong footballer

Chan Wing-sze
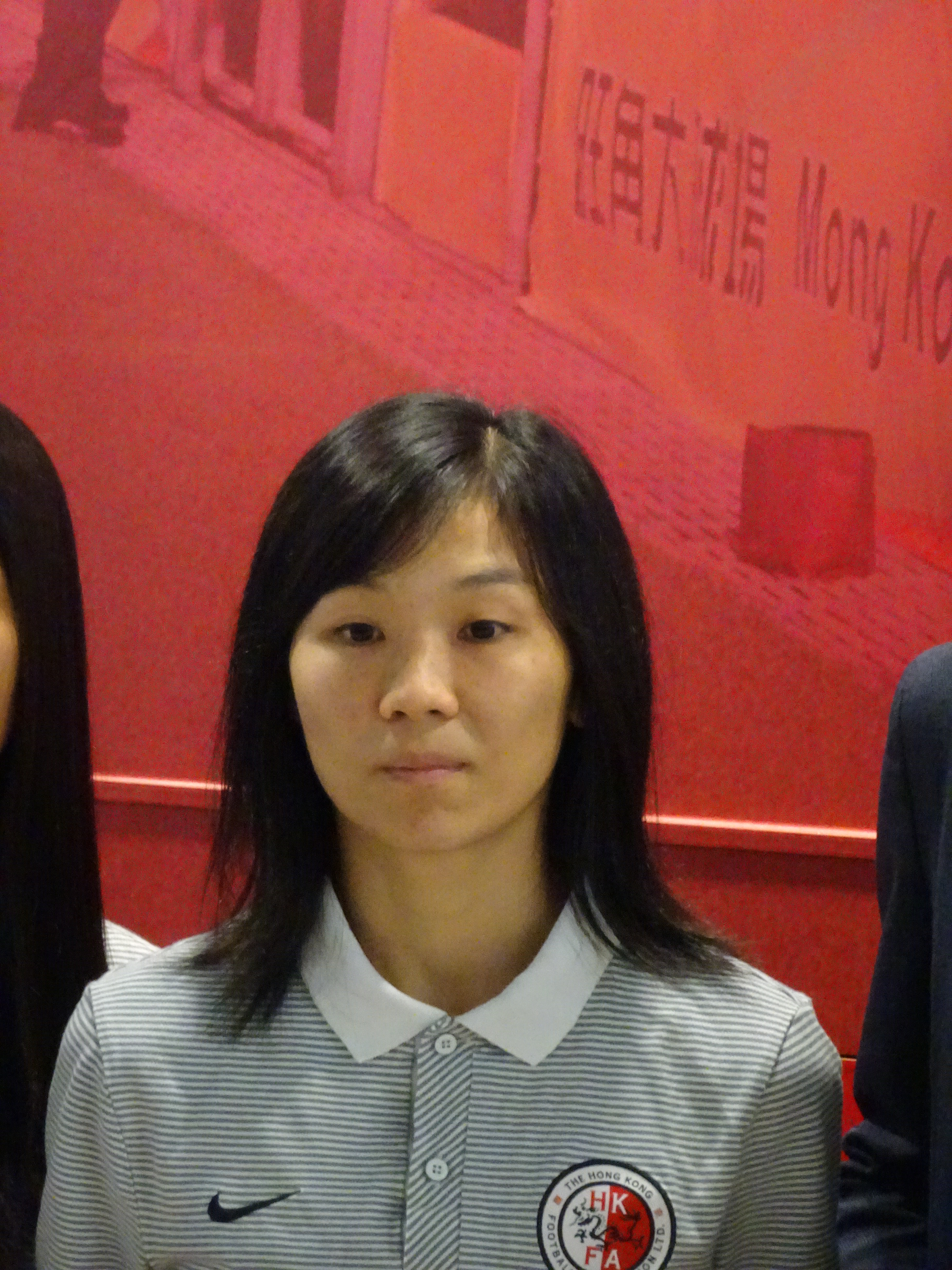

Personal information
- Full name: Chan Wing-sze
- Date of birth: September 11, 1983 (age 43)
- Place of birth: Hong Kong
- Height: 1.65 m (5 ft 5 in)
- Position: Midfielder

International career^{‡}
Years	Team	Apps	(Gls)
2007–2025	Hong Kong	95	(16)
- Hong Kong (futsal)
- ‡ National team caps and goals as of 19:08, 1 October 2015 (UTC)

Chan Wing-sze (陳詠詩, born 11 September 1983) is a Hong Kong former women's professional football player.

== International goals ==
No.	Date	Venue	Opponent	Score	Result	Competition
1.	4 August 2007	Hong Kong Stadium, So Kon Po, Hong Kong	Australia	1–4	1–8	2008 Summer Olympics qualification
2.	20 October 2007	Siu Sai Wan Sports Ground, Siu Sai Wan, Hong Kong	Philippines	?–?	2–3	2008 AFC Women's Asian Cup qualification
3.	22 August 2009	Tainan County Stadium, Tainan County, Taiwan	Chinese Taipei	1–8	1–8	2010 EAFF Women's Football Championship
4.	19 July 2012	Leo Palace Resort, Yona, Guam	Northern Mariana Islands	4–0	11–0	2013 EAFF Women's East Asian Cup
5.	19 July 2012	Leo Palace Resort, Yona, Guam	Northern Mariana Islands	6–0	11–0	2013 EAFF Women's East Asian Cup
6.	19 July 2012	Leo Palace Resort, Yona, Guam	Northern Mariana Islands	11–0	11–0	2013 EAFF Women's East Asian Cup
7.	21 July 2012	Leo Palace Resort, Yona, Guam	Guam	2–0	4–3	2013 EAFF Women's East Asian Cup
8.	24 November 2012	Shenzhen Stadium, Shenzhen, China	Chinese Taipei	1–0	1–2	2013 EAFF Women's East Asian Cup
9.	15 March 2015	Petra Stadium, Amman, Jordan	Palestine	1–0	2–2	2016 AFC Women's Olympic Qualifying Tournament
10.	15 March 2015	Petra Stadium, Amman, Jordan	Palestine	2–0	2–2	2016 AFC Women's Olympic Qualifying Tournament
11.	22 August 2018	Bumi Sriwijaya Stadium, Palembang, Indonesia	Tajikistan	1–0	6–1	2018 Asian Games
12.	24 March 2019	Tseung Kwan O Sports Ground, Tseung Kwan O, Hong Kong	Chinese Taipei	1–0	1–1	Friendly
13.	23 June 2022	Jalan Besar Stadium, Kallang, Singapore	Singapore	3–0	4–0	Friendly
14.	2 December 2023	Suoka Sports Training Base, Zhuhai, China	Northern Mariana Islands	2–0	6–1	2025 EAFF E-1 Football Championship
15.	5 December 2023	Suoka Sports Training Base, Zhuhai, China	Mongolia	4–0	6–0	2025 EAFF E-1 Football Championship
16.	11 July 2024	Hong Kong Football Club Stadium, Happy Valley, Hong Kong	Indonesia	2–1	3–2	Friendly

== See also ==
- List of Hong Kong women's international footballers
