= Ho Mui Mei =

Hongkonger footballer

Personal information
- Full name: Ho Mui Mei
- Date of birth: 15 March 1993 (age 33)
- Place of birth: China
- Position: Forward

Team information
- Current team: Citizen AA

Senior career*
| Years | Team | Apps | (Gls) |
- Citizen AA

International career^{‡}
| 2018– | Hong Kong | 11 | (2) |
- * Club domestic league appearances and goals ‡ National team caps and goals as of 15 September 2019

Ho Mui Mei (born 15 March 1993) is a footballer who plays as a forward for Hong Kong Women League club Citizen AA. Born in mainland China, she represents Hong Kong internationally.

== International career ==
Ho Mui Mei represented Hong Kong at the 2018 Asian Games, the 2019 EAFF E-1 Football Championship and the 2020 AFC Women's Olympic Qualifying Tournament.

== International goals ==
| No. | Date | Venue | Opponent | Score | Result | Competition |
|---|---|---|---|---|---|---|
| 1. | 22 August 2018 | Bumi Sriwijaya Stadium, Palembang, Indonesia | Tajikistan | 3–0 | 6–1 | 2018 Asian Games |
| 2. | 22 August 2018 | Bumi Sriwijaya Stadium, Palembang, Indonesia | Tajikistan | 4–0 | 6–1 | 2018 Asian Games |
| 3. | 14 July 2024 | Hong Kong Football Club, Happy Valley, Hong Kong | Indonesia | 2–0 | 4–1 | Friendly |
| 4. | 31 May 2025 | Changlimithang Stadium, Thimphu, Bhutan | Malaysia | 2–1 | 2–1 | 2025 Women's Tri-Nation Cup |

== See also ==
- List of Hong Kong women's international footballers
