= 2020 Taiwan Mulan Football League =

Taiwan Mulan Football League
- Season: 2020
- Dates: 11 April – 7 November 2020
- Champions: Hualien
- Matches: 45
- Goals: 162 (3.6 per match)
- Top goalscorer: Michelle Pao (21 goals)
- Highest scoring: Taipei 3–7 Hualien (27 June 2020)
- Longest winning run: Hualien (7 games)
- Longest unbeaten run: Hualien (15 games)
- Longest winless run: Kaohsiung (14 games)
- Longest losing run: Kaohsiung (6 games)

The 2020 Taiwan Mulan Football League season was the 7th season of the Taiwan Mulan Football League, the top division of women's football in Taiwan. The regular season began on 11 April and concluded on 7 November 2020.

== Teams ==
Locations of the 2020 Taiwan Mulan Football League teams

Team	Location	Stadium	Capacity	2019 position
Hualien	Hualien	Hualien Stadium	13,500	2nd
Kaohsiung	Kaohsiung	National Stadium	55,000	4th
New Taipei	New Taipei	Fu Jen Catholic University Football Field	3,000	5th
Taichung	Taichung	Taiyuan Football Field	1,000	1st
Taipei	Taipei	Taipei Municipal Stadium	20,000	3rd
Taoyuan	Taoyuan	National Taiwan Sport University Stadium	1,000	6th

== Table ==
Pos	Team	Pld	W	D	L	GF	GA	GD	Pts	
1	Hualien	15	12	3	0	51	18	+33	39	Advance to 2020 Taiwan Mulan League Cup Semi-finals
2	Taichung	15	11	0	4	48	22	+26	33	Advance to 2020 Taiwan Mulan League Cup Semi-finals
3	Taipei	15	7	2	6	25	23	+2	23	Advance to 2020 Taiwan Mulan League Cup Quarter-finals
4	Taoyuan	15	4	4	7	17	27	−10	16	Advance to 2020 Taiwan Mulan League Cup Quarter-finals
5	New Taipei	15	3	3	9	12	35	−23	12	Advance to 2020 Taiwan Mulan League Cup Quarter-finals
6	Kaohsiung	15	1	2	12	9	37	−28	5	Advance to 2020 Taiwan Mulan League Cup Quarter-finals

Updated to match(es) played on 19 September 2020. Source: CTFA

== Results table ==
Primary Turn
Casa/Fora	HYU	HUA	ITA	KAO	TBW	TBR
Hang Yuen			1–1		1–3	0–2
Hualien	2–1		2–1	5–0		
Inter Taoyuan					2–5	0–2
Kaohsiung	1–2		0–1			0–2
Taichung		2–3		5–1		0–1
Taipei Bravo		2–2				

Second Turn
Casa/Fora	HYU	HUA	ITA	KAO	TBW	TBR
Hang Yuen			0–2		0–5	0–1
Hualien	6–1		2–0		5–2	
Inter Taoyuan						0–0
Kaohsiung	0–0	0–0	1–2			1–2
Taichung			3–1	6–0		
Taipei Bravo		3–7			1–2	

Third Turn
Casa/Fora	HYU	HUA	ITA	KAO	TBW	TBR
Hang Yuen			0–0	2–1		2–1
Hualien	4–0		3–3	3–0		
Inter Taoyuan				3–1	0–2	1–5
Kaohsiung						1–0
Taichung	6–2	1–2		4–2		2–1
Taipei Bravo		2–5				

== Mulan League Cup ==
Quarterfinals
4	Taoyuan	2
5	New Taipei	1
3	Taipei	5
6	Kaohsiung	1

Semifinals
1	Hualien	3
4	Taoyuan	2
2	Taichung	2
3	Taipei	1

Finals
1	Hualien	1
2	Taichung	0

== Statistics ==
=== Top scorers ===
Rank	Player	Club	Goals
1	(Taiwan) Michelle Pao	Taichung	21

=== Top assists ===
Rank	Player	Club	Assists
1	(Taiwan) Tan Wen-lin	Hualien	9

=== Clean sheets ===
Rank	Player	Club	Clean sheets
1	(Taiwan) Lo Han-ching	Taipei	5
