= Ng Cheuk Wai =

Hongkonger football and futsal player

Ng Cheuk Wai 吳卓蔚
Personal information
- Full name: Ng Cheuk Wai
- Date of birth: 19 March 1997 (age 29)
- Place of birth: Kwai Chung, Hong Kong
- Position: Goalkeeper

Team information
- Current team: FC Zebra ladies Iwate

Senior career*
Years	Team	Apps	(Gls)
2017-2021	Happy Valley		
2021-2022	Taichung blue whale		
2022-2023	MARS Women's FC		
2023-	FC Zebra ladies Iwate		

International career^{‡}
2012	Hong Kong U16		(0)
2014	Hong Kong U19		(0)
2015–2018	Hong Kong (futsal)		(0)
2016–	Hong Kong	7	(0)
- * Club domestic league appearances and goals ‡ National team caps and goals as of 15 September 2019

Ng Cheuk Wai (born 19 March 1997) is a Hong Kong footballer who plays as a goalkeeper for Iwate Zebras Women's FC in the Japan Mynavi Tohoku Women‘s Football League (Division 2) . She is also a futsal player, and represented Hong Kong internationally in both football and futsal.She also coaches for some Hong Kong schools.

== Club career ==
In Oct 2017, Ng Cheuk Wai signed with Happy Valley AA club Hong Kong Women League .

In 2021, Ng Cheuk Wai signed with Taichung blue whale for the Taiwan Mulan Football League.

In 2022, Ng Cheuk Wai signed with MARS Women's Football Club for the Taiwan Mulan Football League .

In May 2023, Ng Cheuk Wai signed with FC Zebra ladies Iwate for the Japan Mynavi Tohoku Women‘s Football League (Division 2) .

== International career ==
Ng Cheuk Wai has been capped for Hong Kong at senior level in both football and futsal. In football, she represented Hong Kong at the 2013 AFC U-16 Women's Championship qualification, the 2015 AFC U-19 Women's Championship qualification, two EAFF E-1 Football Championship editions (2017 and 2019), the 2018 AFC Women's Asian Cup qualification, the 2018 Asian Games and the 2020 AFC Women's Olympic Qualifying Tournament.

In futsal, Ng Cheuk Wai played for Hong Kong at two AFC Women's Futsal Championship editions (2015 and 2018).

== See also ==
- List of Hong Kong women's international footballers
