= Yu Hsiu-chin =

Chinese football player from Taiwan

Personal information
- Full name: Yu Hsiu-chin
- Date of birth: 1 June 1990 (age 36)
- Place of birth: Hualien, Taiwan
- Position: Striker

International career
Years	Team	Apps	(Gls)
2007–	Taiwan		(20)

Yu Hsiu-chin (Chinese: 余秀菁; pinyin: Yú Xiùjīng; born 1 June 1990) is a Taiwanese female football and futsal player who plays as a striker.

== International goals ==
No.	Date	Venue	Opponent	Score	Result	Competition
1.	5 July 2007	LeoPalace Resort Main Stadium, Yona, Guam	Hong Kong	1–0	8–0	2008 EAFF Women's Football Championship
2.	21 May 2013	Faisal Al-Husseini International Stadium, Al-Ram, Palestine	Palestine	2–0	6–0	2014 AFC Women's Asian Cup qualification
3.	23 May 2013	Faisal Al-Husseini International Stadium, Al-Ram, Palestine	India	1–0	2–1	2014 AFC Women's Asian Cup qualification
4.	15 November 2014	Hsinchu County Stadium, Zhubei, Taiwan	Guam	2–0	4–0	2015 EAFF Women's East Asian Cup
5.	15 November 2014	Hsinchu County Stadium, Zhubei, Taiwan	Guam	4–0	4–0	2015 EAFF Women's East Asian Cup
6.	11 November 2016	Hong Kong Football Club Stadium, Hong Kong	Guam	6–1	8–1	2017 EAFF E-1 Football Championship
7.	5 April 2017	Faisal Al-Husseini International Stadium, Al-Ram, Palestine	Palestine	2–0	5–0	2018 AFC Women's Asian Cup qualification
8.	5 April 2017	Faisal Al-Husseini International Stadium, Al-Ram, Palestine	Palestine	4–0	5–0	2018 AFC Women's Asian Cup qualification
9.	5 April 2017	Faisal Al-Husseini International Stadium, Al-Ram, Palestine	Palestine	5–0	5–0	2018 AFC Women's Asian Cup qualification
10.	16 August 2018	Gelora Sriwijaya Stadium, Palembang, Indonesia	South Korea	1–2	1–2	2018 Asian Games
11.	19 August 2018	Gelora Sriwijaya Stadium, Palembang, Indonesia	Indonesia	1–0	4–0	2018 Asian Games
12.	22 August 2018	Bumi Sriwijaya Stadium, Palembang, Indonesia	Maldives	1–0	7–0	2018 Asian Games
13.	6 November 2018	Hisor Stadium, Hisor, Tajikistan	Tajikistan	3–0	9–0	2020 AFC Women's Olympic Qualifying Tournament
14.	6 November 2018	Hisor Stadium, Hisor, Tajikistan	Tajikistan	4–0	9–0	2020 AFC Women's Olympic Qualifying Tournament
15.	6 November 2018	Hisor Stadium, Hisor, Tajikistan	Tajikistan	5–0	9–0	2020 AFC Women's Olympic Qualifying Tournament
16.	8 November 2018	Hisor Stadium, Hisor, Tajikistan	Mongolia	4–0	9–0	2020 AFC Women's Olympic Qualifying Tournament
17.	8 November 2018	Hisor Stadium, Hisor, Tajikistan	Mongolia	5–0	9–0	2020 AFC Women's Olympic Qualifying Tournament
18.	8 November 2018	Hisor Stadium, Hisor, Tajikistan	Mongolia	6–0	9–0	2020 AFC Women's Olympic Qualifying Tournament
19.	11 November 2018	Hisor Stadium, Hisor, Tajikistan	Singapore	1–0	10–0	2020 AFC Women's Olympic Qualifying Tournament
20.	11 November 2018	Hisor Stadium, Hisor, Tajikistan	Singapore	3–0	10–0	2020 AFC Women's Olympic Qualifying Tournament
21.	11 November 2018	Hisor Stadium, Hisor, Tajikistan	Singapore	4–0	10–0	2020 AFC Women's Olympic Qualifying Tournament
22.	13 November 2018	Hisor Stadium, Hisor, Tajikistan	Philippines	3–0	5–0	2020 AFC Women's Olympic Qualifying Tournament
