= Lin Ya-han =

Taiwanese footballer (born 1990)

Personal information
- Date of birth: 15 December 1990 (age 35)
- Place of birth: Keelung City, Taiwan
- Height: 1.74 m (5 ft 9 in)
- Position: Midfielder

Team information
- Current team: Taipei Bravo
- Number: 23

Senior career*
Years	Team	Apps	(Gls)
	Taipei Bravo	0	(0)

International career^{‡}
2009	Chinese Taipei U19		(2)
2013–	Chinese Taipei	19	(14)
- * Club domestic league appearances and goals ‡ National team caps and goals as of 20 November 2019

Lin Ya-han (Chinese: 林雅涵; born 15 December 1990) is a Taiwanese footballer who plays as a midfielder for Taiwan Mulan Football League club Taipei Bravo, where she serves as its captain, and the Chinese Taipei women's national team.

== International goals ==
Scores and results list Chinese Taipei's goal tally first.

No.	Date	Venue	Opponent	Score	Result	Competition
1.	21 May 2013	Faisal Al-Husseini International Stadium, Al-Ram, Palestine	Palestine	1–0	6–0	2014 AFC Women's Asian Cup qualification
2.	21 May 2013	Faisal Al-Husseini International Stadium, Al-Ram, Palestine	Palestine	5–0	6–0	2014 AFC Women's Asian Cup qualification
3.	21 May 2013	Faisal Al-Husseini International Stadium, Al-Ram, Palestine	Palestine	6–0	6–0	2014 AFC Women's Asian Cup qualification
4.	15 September 2014	Namdong Asiad Rugby Field, Incheon, South Korea	Jordan	1–0	2–2	2014 Asian Games
5.	15 November 2014	Hsinchu County Stadium, Zhubei, Taiwan	Guam	1–0	4–0	2015 EAFF Women's East Asian Cup
6.	20 May 2015	Taipei Municipal Stadium, Taipei, Taiwan	Laos	3–0	4–0	2016 AFC Women's Olympic Qualifying Tournament
7.	8 November 2016	Hong Kong Football Club Stadium, Hong Kong	Hong Kong	1–0	5–0	2017 EAFF E-1 Football Championship
8.	8 November 2016	Hong Kong Football Club Stadium, Hong Kong	Hong Kong	2–0	5–0	2017 EAFF E-1 Football Championship
9.	11 November 2016	Hong Kong Football Club Stadium, Hong Kong	Guam	4–1	8–1	2017 EAFF E-1 Football Championship
10.	11 November 2016	Hong Kong Football Club Stadium, Hong Kong	Guam	7–1	8–1	2017 EAFF E-1 Football Championship
11.	11 November 2016	Hong Kong Football Club Stadium, Hong Kong	Guam	8–1	8–1	2017 EAFF E-1 Football Championship
12.	19 August 2018	Gelora Sriwijaya Stadium, Palembang, Indonesia	Indonesia	3–0	4–0	2018 Asian Games
13.	8 November 2018	Hisor Central Stadium, Hisor, Tajikistan	Mongolia	9–0	9–0	2020 AFC Women's Olympic Qualifying Tournament
14.	11 November 2018	Hisor Central Stadium, Hisor, Tajikistan	Singapore	9–0	10–0	2020 AFC Women's Olympic Qualifying Tournament
