= Chinese Taipei women's football championship =

- Country: Taiwan
- Confederation: AFC
- Number of clubs: 6
- Level on pyramid: 1

The Chinese Taipei women's football championship was the top level women's football league in Taiwan. The league was organized by the Chinese Taipei Football Association.

== Teams ==
The 2011 season was played by the following 6 teams:

- Hsing Wu College
- Hsing Wu High School
- New Taipei City
- National Taiwan Normal University (NTNU) Feiyang
- National Taiwan Sports University (NTSU)
- Soccer Soul

The 2012 season was played by the following 8 teams:

- ANL Mulan (ANL木蘭)
- Chiayi Yung County Ching High School
- Taipei SCSC
- Hsing Wu College
- Hsing Wu High School
- New Taipei City
- National Taiwan Normal University (NTNU)
- National Taiwan Sport University (NTSU)

== Format ==
The league features six or seven teams per year that play each other twice (2008) or thrice (2009) to decide the champion.

== Champions ==
The champions so far are:

- 1999 Wei Da
- 2000 Wei Da
- 2001
- 2002
- 2003
- 2004
- 2005 Hsing Wu
- 2006 Fei Yang
- 2007
- 2008 Shida Yei Fang
- 2009 Taipei SCSC
- 2010 Shida
- 2011 Taiwan Sports University
- 2012
