= Football at the 2018 Asian Games – Women's tournament =

Women's Football Tournament at the 2018 Asian Games
Tournament details
- Host country: Indonesia
- Dates: 16–31 August
- Teams: 11 (from 1 confederation)
- Venues: 2 (in 1 host city)

Final positions
- Champions: Japan (2nd title)
- Runners-up: China
- Third place: South Korea
- Fourth place: Chinese Taipei

Tournament statistics
- Matches played: 23
- Goals scored: 132 (5.74 per match)
- Top scorer(s): Wang Shanshan (CHN) (12 goals)

The women's football tournament at the 2018 Asian Games was held from 16 to 31 August in Palembang, Indonesia. North Korea were the defending champions, but were eliminated in the quarter-finals. The host team was eliminated in the group stage.

== Competition schedule ==
G	Group stage	¼	Quarter-finals	½	Semi-finals	B	Bronze medal match	F	Gold medal match

Thu 16	Fri 17	Sat 18	Sun 19	Mon 20	Tue 21	Wed 22	Thu 23	Fri 24	Sat 25	Sun 26	Mon 27	Tue 28	Wed 29	Thu 30	Fri 31	
G			G					¼				½			B	F

== Venues ==
The tournament was held in two venues in Palembang, the Gelora Sriwijaya Stadium and the Bumi Sriwijaya Stadium.

(Indonesia) Palembang
Gelora Sriwijaya	Bumi Sriwijaya
Capacity: 23,000	Capacity: 7,000
Football at the 2018 Asian Games – Women's tournament is located in Palembang

== Draw ==
The draw for the tournament was held on 5 July 2018. The teams were seeded into four pots based on their performances in the previous Asian Games in 2014. The hosts Indonesia were automatically assigned into position A1.

Pot 1	Pot 2	Pot 3	Pot 4
1. Indonesia (hosts); 2. North Korea; 3. Japan	4. South Korea; 5. Vietnam; 6. China	7. Thailand; 8. Chinese Taipei; 9. Hong Kong	10. Maldives; 11. Tajikistan

== Group stage ==
The top two teams in each group, and the two third-placed teams among three groups advanced to the quarter-finals.

All times are local, WIB (UTC+7).

=== Tiebreakers ===
Teams in a group were ranked according to points (3 points for a win, 1 point for a draw, 0 points for a loss), and if tied on points, the following tiebreaking criteria were applied, in the order given, to determine the rankings.

1. Highest number of points obtained in all group matches;
2. Highest number of points obtained in the group matches between the teams concerned;
3. Goal difference resulting from the group matches between the teams concerned;
4. Highest number of goals scored from all group matches between the teams concerned;
5. If two or more teams have equal ranking with the criteria so far, reapply the criteria above only for them. If this re-application gives no more ranking, apply the following criteria.
6. Goal difference in all group matches;
7. Highest number of goals scored in all group matches;
8. Kicks from the penalty mark only if two (2) teams are involved and they are both on the field of play.
9. Fewer points of yellow/red cards in all group matches (only one of these deductions shall be applied to a player in a single match):
  - First yellow card: 1 point;
  - Indirect red card (second yellow card): 3 points;
  - Direct red card: 3 points;
  - Yellow card followed by direct red card: 4 points;
10. Drawing of lots

Third-placed teams from the three groups are ranked according to the following criteria, after the results against the fourth-placed teams of groups A and B are excluded in order to rank them with the same numbers of matches.

1. Highest number of points obtained in all group matches;
2. Goal difference in all group matches;
3. Highest number of goals scored in all group matches;
4. Fewer points of yellow/red cards in all group matches (only one of these deductions shall be applied to a player in a single match):
  - First yellow card: 1 point;
  - Indirect red card (second yellow card): 3 points;
  - Direct red card: 3 points;
  - Yellow card followed by direct red card: 4 points;
5. Drawing of lots

=== Group A ===
Pos	Team	Pld	W	D	L	GF	GA	GD	Pts	Qualification
1	South Korea	3	3	0	0	22	1	+21	9	Advance to Knockout stage
2	Chinese Taipei	3	2	0	1	12	2	+10	6	Advance to Knockout stage
3	Indonesia (H)	3	1	0	2	6	16	−10	3	
4	Maldives	3	0	0	3	0	21	−21	0	

Source: Asian Games 2018
Rules for classification: Group stage tiebreakers
(H) Hosts
16 August 2018
15:00 UTC+7

South Korea	2–1	Chinese Taipei
Jeon Ga-eul 8'; Jang Sel-gi 53'	Report	Yu Hsiu-chin 74'

Gelora Sriwijaya Stadium, Palembang
Referee: Rebecca Durcau (Australia)
16 August 2018
18:30 UTC+7

Indonesia	6–0	Maldives
Musdalifah 10', 72'; Zp 15' (pen.), 55'; Sada 30'; Sari 61'	Report

Gelora Sriwijaya Stadium, Palembang
Referee: Thein Thein Aye (Myanmar)

19 August 2018
15:00 UTC+7

Maldives	0–8	South Korea
	Report	Ji So-yun 25' (pen.); Shamila 35' (o.g.); Son Hwa-yeon 35', 60', 87'; Moon Mi-ra 45', 54' (pen.); Lee Eun-mi 88'

Gelora Sriwijaya Stadium, Palembang
Referee: Law Bik Chi (Hong Kong)
19 August 2018
18:30 UTC+7

Chinese Taipei	4–0	Indonesia
Yu Hsiu-chin 5'; Chan Pi-han 16'; Lin Ya-han 33'; Michelle Pao 39'	Report

Gelora Sriwijaya Stadium, Palembang
Referee: Asaka Matsushita (Japan)

21 August 2018
18:30 UTC+7

Indonesia	0–12	South Korea
	Report	Lee Hyun-young 4' (pen.), 38', 47', 71', 90'; Moon Mi-ra 11', 37'; Lim Seon-joo 14'; Son Hwa-yeon 48'; Jang Sel-gi 67'; Ji So-yun 88', 90+2'

Gelora Sriwijaya Stadium, Palembang
Referee: Mahsa Ghorbani (Iran)
21 August 2018
18:30 UTC+7

Chinese Taipei	7–0	Maldives
Yu Hsiu-chin 6' (pen.); Pan Shin-yu 12', 31'; Zhuo Li-ping 17', 74'; Michelle Pao 55'; Lee Hsiu-chin 63'	Report

Bumi Sriwijaya Stadium, Palembang
Referee: Pansa Chaisanit (Thailand)

=== Group B ===
Pos	Team	Pld	W	D	L	GF	GA	GD	Pts	Qualification
1	China	3	3	0	0	25	0	+25	9	Advance to Knockout stage
2	North Korea	3	2	0	1	24	2	+22	6	Advance to Knockout stage
3	Hong Kong	3	1	0	2	6	16	−10	3	Advance to Knockout stage
4	Tajikistan	3	0	0	3	1	38	−37	0	

Source: Asian Games 2018
Rules for classification: Group stage tiebreakers
17 August 2018
18:30 UTC+7

North Korea	16–0	Tajikistan
Sung Hyang-sim 2', 6', 24', 42'; Kim Yun-mi 10', 19', 50'; Rim Se-ok 31', 55', 66'; Yu Jong-im 43'; Kim Phyong-hwa 46'; Kim Nam-hui 62'; Kim Un-hwa 77', 82'; Ri Hae-yon 79'	Report

Bumi Sriwijaya Stadium, Palembang
Referee: Pansa Chaisanit (Thailand)
17 August 2018
18:30 UTC+7

China	7–0	Hong Kong
Wang Shuang 7' (pen.); Wang Shanshan 20'; Li Ying 28'; Li Jiayue 42'; Chan Wing Sze 48' (o.g.); Gu Yasha 51', 72'	Report

Gelora Sriwijaya Stadium, Palembang
Referee: Oh Hyeon-jeong (South Korea)

20 August 2018
18:30 UTC+7

Tajikistan	0–16	China
	Report	Zhao Rong 3', 19', 47', 59', 90'; Li Tingting 4'; Wang Shuang 51'; Wang Shanshan 64', 73', 81', 83', 87', 88', 90+1', 90+2', 90+3'

Gelora Sriwijaya Stadium, Palembang
Referee: Bui Thi Thu Trang (Vietnam)
20 August 2018
18:30 UTC+7

Hong Kong	0–8	North Korea
	Report	Ri Un-yong 19'; Yu Jong-im 22', 45+2'; Kim Yun-mi 36'; Pak Hye-gyong 55'; Kim Un-hwa 59'; Ri Hae-yon 78'; Kay Fung 82' (o.g.)

Bumi Sriwijaya Stadium, Palembang
Referee: Anna Sidorova (Uzbekistan)

22 August 2018
18:30 UTC+7

North Korea	0–2	China
	Report	Wang Shuang 8'; Wang Shanshan 50'

Gelora Sriwijaya Stadium, Palembang
Referee: Rebecca Durcau (Australia)
22 August 2018
18:30 UTC+7

Hong Kong	6–1	Tajikistan
Chan Wing Sze 2'; Heidi Yuen 10'; Ho Mui Mei 25', 32'; Cham Ching Man 39'; Chun Ching Hang 68'	Report	Sotnikova 36'

Bumi Sriwijaya Stadium, Palembang
Referee: Lee Yi-chi (Chinese Taipei)

=== Group C ===
Pos	Team	Pld	W	D	L	GF	GA	GD	Pts	Qualification
1	Japan	2	2	0	0	9	0	+9	6	Advance to Knockout stage
2	Vietnam	2	1	0	1	3	9	−6	3	Advance to Knockout stage
3	Thailand	2	0	0	2	2	5	−3	0	Advance to Knockout stage

Source: Asian Games 2018
Rules for classification: Group stage tiebreakers
16 August 2018
18:30 UTC+7

Thailand	0–2	Japan
	Report	Iwabuchi 33'; Momiki 85'

Bumi Sriwijaya Stadium, Palembang
Referee: Mi Siyu (China)

19 August 2018
18:30 UTC+7

Vietnam	3–2	Thailand
Nguyễn Thị Tuyết Dung 22'; Nguyễn Thị Vạn 33'; Nguyễn Thị Liễu 40'	Report	Suchawadee 30' (pen.); Pitsamai 79'

Bumi Sriwijaya Stadium, Palembang
Referee: Mahsa Ghorbani (Iran)

21 August 2018
15:00 UTC+7

Japan	7–0	Vietnam
Sugasawa 5', 77'; Momiki 17'; Nakajima 38'; Tanaka 52', 88'; Masuya 64'	Report

Gelora Sriwijaya Stadium, Palembang
Referee: Thein Thein Aye (Myanmar)

=== Ranking of third-placed teams ===
In order to ensure equality when comparing the third-placed teams of all groups, the results of the matches against the 4th-placed teams in Group A and Group B were ignored due to Group C having only three teams.

Pos	Grp	Team	Pld	W	D	L	GF	GA	GD	Pts	Qualification
1	C	Thailand	2	0	0	2	2	5	−3	0	Advance to knockout stage
2	B	Hong Kong	2	0	0	2	0	15	−15	0	Advance to knockout stage
3	A	Indonesia	2	0	0	2	0	16	−16	0	

Source: Asian Games 2018 Archived 26 August 2018 at the Wayback Machine
Rules for classification: 1) points; 2) goal difference; 3) goals scored; 4) fair play points; 5) drawing of lots.

== Knockout stage ==
In the knockout stage, extra time and penalty shoot-out are used to decide the winner if necessary, except for the third place match where penalty shoot-out (no extra time) is used to decide the winner if necessary.

Third-placed teams qualify from groups			1A vs	1B vs
A	B		3B	3A
A		C	3C	3A
	B	C	3B	3C

=== Bracket ===
Quarter-finals
24 August – Palembang
South Korea	5
Hong Kong	0
25 August – Palembang
Japan	2
North Korea	1
24 August – Palembang
Chinese Taipei (p)	0 (4)
Vietnam	0 (3)
25 August – Palembang
China	5
Thailand	0

Semi-finals
28 August – Palembang
South Korea	1
Japan	2
28 August – Palembang
Chinese Taipei	0
China	1

Gold medal match
31 August – Palembang
Japan	1
China	0
Bronze medal match
31 August – Palembang
South Korea	4
Chinese Taipei	0

=== Quarter-finals ===
24 August 2018
16:00 UTC+7

South Korea	5–0	Hong Kong
Jeon Ga-eul 20', 32'; Lee Geum-min 34'; Moon Mi-ra 79'; Lee Min-a 82'	Report

Gelora Sriwijaya Stadium, Palembang
Referee: Asaka Matsushita (Japan)

24 August 2018
19:30 UTC+7

Chinese Taipei	0–0 (a.e.t.)	Vietnam
	Report
Penalties
Yu Hsiu-chin (penalty scored); Lin Ya-han (penalty scored); Liu Chien-yun (penalty scored); Michelle Pao (penalty scored)	4–3	(penalty scored) Nguyễn Thị Tuyết Dung; (penalty scored) Chương Thị Kiều; (penalty missed) Phạm Hoàng Quỳnh; (penalty scored) Nguyễn Thị Mỹ Anh; (penalty missed) Thái Thị Thảo

Gelora Sriwijaya Stadium, Palembang
Referee: Oh Hyeon-jeong (South Korea)

25 August 2018
16:00 UTC+7

Japan	2–1	North Korea
Iwabuchi 40'; Hasegawa 62'	Report	Kim Nam-hui 71' (pen.)

Gelora Sriwijaya Stadium, Palembang
Referee: Mahsa Ghorbani (Iran)

25 August 2018
19:30 UTC+7

China	5–0	Thailand
Wang Shuang 32', 84', 90+1'; Xiao Yuyi 65'; Gu Yasha 85'	Report

Gelora Sriwijaya Stadium, Palembang
Referee: Anna Sidorova (Uzbekistan)

=== Semi-finals ===
28 August 2018
16:00 UTC+7

South Korea	1–2	Japan
Lee Min-a 68'	Report	Sugasawa 5'; Lim Seon-joo 86' (o.g.)

Gelora Sriwijaya Stadium, Palembang
Referee: Law Bik Chi (Hong Kong)

28 August 2018
19:30 UTC+7

Chinese Taipei	0–1	China
	Report	Wang Shanshan 51'

Gelora Sriwijaya Stadium, Palembang
Referee: Thein Thein Aye (Myanmar)

=== Bronze medal match ===
31 August 2018
15:00 UTC+7

South Korea	4–0	Chinese Taipei
Ji So-yun 18'; Lee Geum-min 31'; Lee Min-a 77'; Moon Mi-ra 90'	Report

Gelora Sriwijaya Stadium, Palembang
Referee: Asaka Matsushita (Japan)

=== Gold medal match ===
31 August 2018
18:30 UTC+7

Japan	1–0	China
Sugasawa 90'	Report

Gelora Sriwijaya Stadium, Palembang
Referee: Oh Hyeon-jeong (South Korea)

== Statistics ==
=== Goalscorers ===
There were 132 goals scored in 23 matches, for an average of 5.74 goals per match.

12 goals

- Wang Shanshan (CHN)

6 goals

- Wang Shuang (CHN)
- Moon Mi-ra (KOR)

5 goals

- Zhao Rong (CHN)
- Lee Hyun-young (KOR)

4 goals

- Yuika Sugasawa (JPN)
- Sung Hyang-sim (PRK)
- Kim Yun-mi (PRK)
- Ji So-yun (KOR)
- Son Hwa-yeon (KOR)

3 goals

- Gu Yasha (CHN)
- Yu Hsiu-chin (TPE)
- Yu Jong-im (PRK)
- Rim Se-ok (PRK)
- Kim Un-hwa (PRK)
- Jeon Ga-eul (KOR)
- Lee Min-a (KOR)

2 goals

- Zhuo Li-ping (TPE)
- Michelle Pao (TPE)
- Pan Shin-yu (TPE)
- Ho Mui Mei (HKG)
- Zahra Musdalifah (INA)
- Mayang Zp (INA)
- Mana Iwabuchi (JPN)
- Yuka Momiki (JPN)
- Mina Tanaka (JPN)
- Kim Nam-hui (PRK)
- Ri Hae-yon (PRK)
- Jang Sel-gi (KOR)
- Lee Geum-min (KOR)

1 goal

- Li Jiayue (CHN)
- Li Tingting (CHN)
- Li Ying (CHN)
- Xiao Yuyi (CHN)
- Lee Hsiu-chin (TPE)
- Chan Pi-han (TPE)
- Lin Ya-han (TPE)
- Chun Ching Hang (HKG)
- Heidi Yuen (HKG)
- Cham Ching Man (HKG)
- Chan Wing Sze (HKG)
- Yudith Herlina Sada (INA)
- Jesella Arifya Sari (INA)
- Yui Hasegawa (JPN)
- Rika Masuya (JPN)
- Emi Nakajima (JPN)
- Pak Hye-gyong (PRK)
- Kim Phyong-hwa (PRK)
- Ri Un-yong (PRK)
- Lee Eun-mi (KOR)
- Lim Seon-joo (KOR)
- Natalia Sotnikova (TJK)
- Suchawadee Nildhamrong (THA)
- Pitsamai Sornsai (THA)
- Nguyễn Thị Tuyết Dung (VIE)
- Nguyễn Thị Liễu (VIE)
- Nguyễn Thị Vạn (VIE)

1 own goal

- Chan Wing Sze (HKG) (against China)
- Kay Fung (HKG) (against North Korea)
- Lim Seon-joo (KOR) (against Japan)
- Aminath Shamila (MDV) (against South Korea)

=== Final standing ===
As per statistical convention in football, matches decided in extra time are counted as wins and losses, while matches decided by penalty shoot-outs are counted as draws.
Note: In order to ensure equality, for teams in four-team groups, their match against the fourth-placed teams are excluded when considering the ranking.

Rank	Team	Pld	W	D	L	GF	GA	GD	Pts
1st place, gold medalist(s)	Japan	5	5	0	0	14	2	+12	15
2nd place, silver medalist(s)	China	6	5	0	1	31	1	+30	15
3rd place, bronze medalist(s)	South Korea	6	5	0	1	32	3	+29	15
4	Chinese Taipei	6	2	1	3	12	7	+5	7
Eliminated in the Quarter-finals
5	Vietnam	3	1	1	1	3	9	−6	4
6	North Korea	4	2	0	2	25	4	+21	6
7	Thailand	3	0	0	3	2	10	−8	0
8	Hong Kong	4	1	0	3	6	21	−15	3
Third place in the group stage
9	Indonesia	3	1	0	2	6	16	−10	3
Fourth place in the group stage
10	Maldives	3	0	0	3	0	21	−21	0
11	Tajikistan	3	0	0	3	1	38	−37	0

== See also ==
- Football at the 2018 Asian Games – Men's tournament
