= Nattaruja Muthtanawech =

Thai footballer

Personal information
- Date of birth: 21 August 1996 (age 30)
- Place of birth: Thailand,
- Height: 1.70 m (5 ft 7 in)
- Position: Goalkeeper

Team information
- Current team: Taichung Blue Whale
- Number: 25

Senior career*
Years	Team	Apps	(Gls)
-2022	BG Bundit Asia		

International career^{‡}
2018–2019	Thailand	4	(0)
- * Club domestic league appearances and goals ‡ National team caps and goals as of 6 March 2019

Nattaruja Muthtanawech (Thai: ณัฐรุจา มุทนาเวช; born 21 August 1996) is a Thai footballer who plays as a goalkeeper for Taiwan Mulan Football League club Taichung Blue Whale. She has been a member of the Thailand women's national team.
