= Chang Wei-chen =

Chinese politician

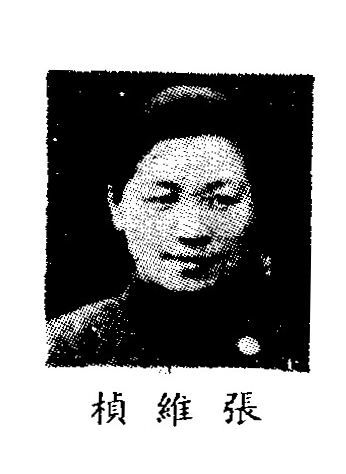

Member of the Legislative Yuan
- In office 1948–1951
- Succeeded by: Zhao Shujia
- Constituency: Jiangsu

Personal details
- Born: 3 June 1898
- Died: March 1997 (aged 98)

Chang Wei-chen (Chinese: 張維楨, 3 June 1898 – March 1997) was a Chinese politician. She was among the first group of women elected to the Legislative Yuan in 1948.

== Biography ==
Born in 1898 and originally from Jiangsu province, Chang graduated from the department of political science at the University of Shanghai. She then attended the University of Michigan in the United States on a Levi Barbour Oriental Girls' Scholarship, graduating with an MA in 1927. Returning to China, she served as a member of the National Political Assembly from 1941 to 1948 and was director of the women's department of the Three People's Principles Youth League. She married Luo Jialun, a politician and diplomat.

In the 1948 elections for the Legislative Yuan, Chang was a candidate in Jiangsu province and was elected to parliament. She subsequently sat on the Economic and Resources Committee and the Legal Committee, and was the convener of the Foreign Affairs Committee. She resigned from the Legislative Yuan in 1951.
