= Zhuo Li-ping =

Taiwanese footballer

Personal information
- Date of birth: 29 September 1999 (age 27)
- Place of birth: Hualien, Taiwan
- Height: 1.63 m (5 ft 4 in)
- Position: Defender

Team information
- Current team: Hualien
- Number: 11

Senior career*
Years	Team	Apps	(Gls)
- Hualien

International career^{‡}
2017	Chinese Taipei U19	3	(1)
2018–	Chinese Taipei	21	(3)
- * Club domestic league appearances and goals ‡ National team caps and goals as of 10 February 2020

Zhuo Li-ping (Chinese: 卓莉萍; born 29 September 1999) is a Taiwanese footballer who plays as a defender for Taiwan Mulan Football League club Hualien FC and the Chinese Taipei women's national team.

== International career ==
Zhuo represented Chinese Taipei at the 2013 AFC U-14 Girls' Regional Championship, the 2015 AFC U-16 Women's Championship and the 2017 AFC U-19 Women's Championship. She was capped at senior level during the 2018 Asian Games, the 2019 EAFF E-1 Football Championship and the 2020 AFC Women's Olympic Qualifying Tournament.

== International goals ==
No	Date	Venue	Opponent	Score	Result	Competition
1.	21 August 2018	Bumi Sriwijaya Stadium, Palembang, Indonesia	Maldives	3–0	7–0	2018 Asian Games
2.	21 August 2018	Bumi Sriwijaya Stadium, Palembang, Indonesia	Maldives	7–0	7–0	2018 Asian Games
3.	3 April 2019	Saoud bin Abdulrahman Stadium, Al Wakrah, Qatar	Palestine	1–0	3–0	2020 AFC Women's Olympic Qualifying Tournament
4.	30 January 2022	Shree Shiv Chhatrapati Sports Complex, Pune, India	Philippines	1–1	1–1 (a.e.t.) (3–4 p)	2022 AFC Women's Asian Cup
5.	4 December 2023	Suoka Sports Training Base Pitch 1, Zhuhai, China	Guam	3–0	3–0	2025 EAFF E-1 Football Championship
