= Chan Pi-han =

Taiwanese footballer (born 1992)

Personal information
- Date of birth: 27 April 1992 (age 34)
- Place of birth: Kaohsiung City, Taiwan
- Height: 1.56 m (5 ft 1 in)
- Position: Midfielder

International career^{‡}
| Years | Team | Apps | (Gls) |
| 2008–2010 | Chinese Taipei U19 | 11 | (0) |
| 2013–2018 | Chinese Taipei | 15 | (2) |
- ‡ National team caps and goals as of 31 August 2018.

Chan Pi-han (Chinese: 詹筆涵; born 27 April 1992) is a Taiwanese footballer who plays as a midfielder. She has been a member of the Chinese Taipei women's national team.

== International career ==
Chan Pi-han capped for Chinese Taipei at senior level during two AFC Women's Asian Cup qualifications (2014 and 2018), the 2016 AFC Women's Olympic Qualifying Tournament, the 2017 EAFF E-1 Football Championship and the 2018 Asian Games.

== International goals ==
Scores and results list Chinese Taipei's goal tally first.

| No. | Date | Venue | Opponent | Score | Result | Competition |
|---|---|---|---|---|---|---|
| 1. | 16 September 2015 | Mandalarthiri Stadium, Mandalay, Myanmar | Jordan | 1–0 | 3–0 | 2016 AFC Women's Olympic Qualifying Tournament |
| 2. | 19 August 2018 | Gelora Sriwijaya Stadium, Palembang, Indonesia | Indonesia | 2–0 | 4–0 | 2018 Asian Games |
| 3. | 30 November 2023 | Suoka Sports Training Base, Zhuhai, China | Macau | 1–0 | 16–0 | 2024 EAFF E-1 Football Championship |
