= Michelle Pao =

Chinese football player from Taiwan

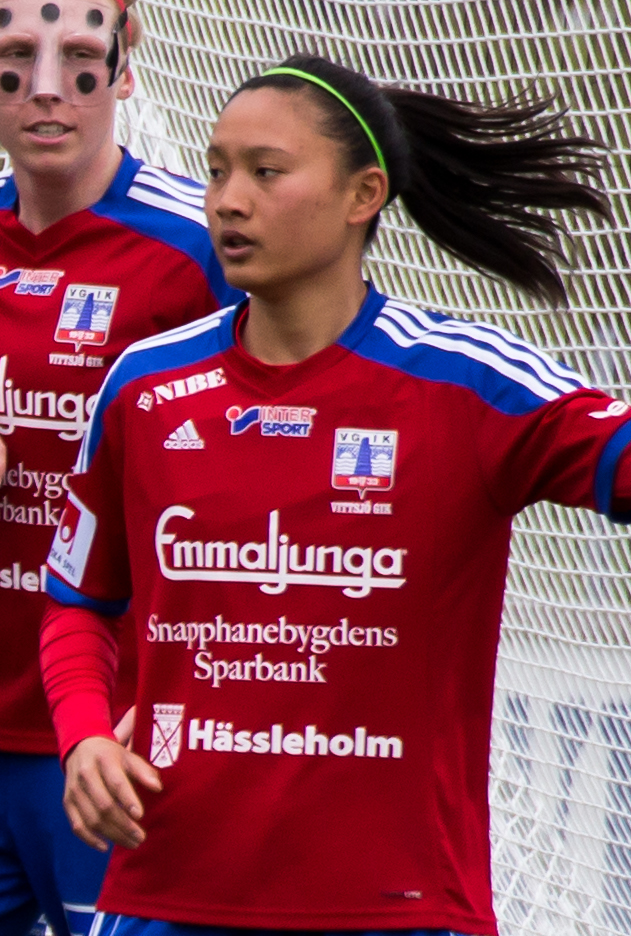

Personal information
- Full name: Pao Hsin-hsuan
- Date of birth: 1 September 1992 (age 34)
- Place of birth: Hsinchu, Taiwan
- Height: 1.63 m (5 ft 4 in)
- Position: Midfielder

College career
Years	Team	Apps	(Gls)
2010–2013	Pepperdine Waves		

Senior career*
Years	Team	Apps	(Gls)
2015	Vittsjö GIK	19	(3)
2016–2017	Nojima Stella	33	(12)
2018–2021	Taichung Blue Whale	25	(26)

International career^{‡}
2015–2021	Chinese Taipei	26	(17)
- * Club domestic league appearances and goals as of October 1, 2015 ‡ National team caps and goals as of 17 December 2023

Michelle Pao Hsin-hsuan (Chinese: 包欣玄; pinyin: Bāo Xīnxuán; born 1 September 1992) is a former Taiwanese footballer who played as a midfielder.

== Youth career ==
Pao played collegiate soccer for Pepperdine University during her college years between 2010 and 2014. She is Pepperdine's first player to earn four-time All-WCC first team honors, and was also four-time NSCAA All-West Region pick.

== Professional career ==
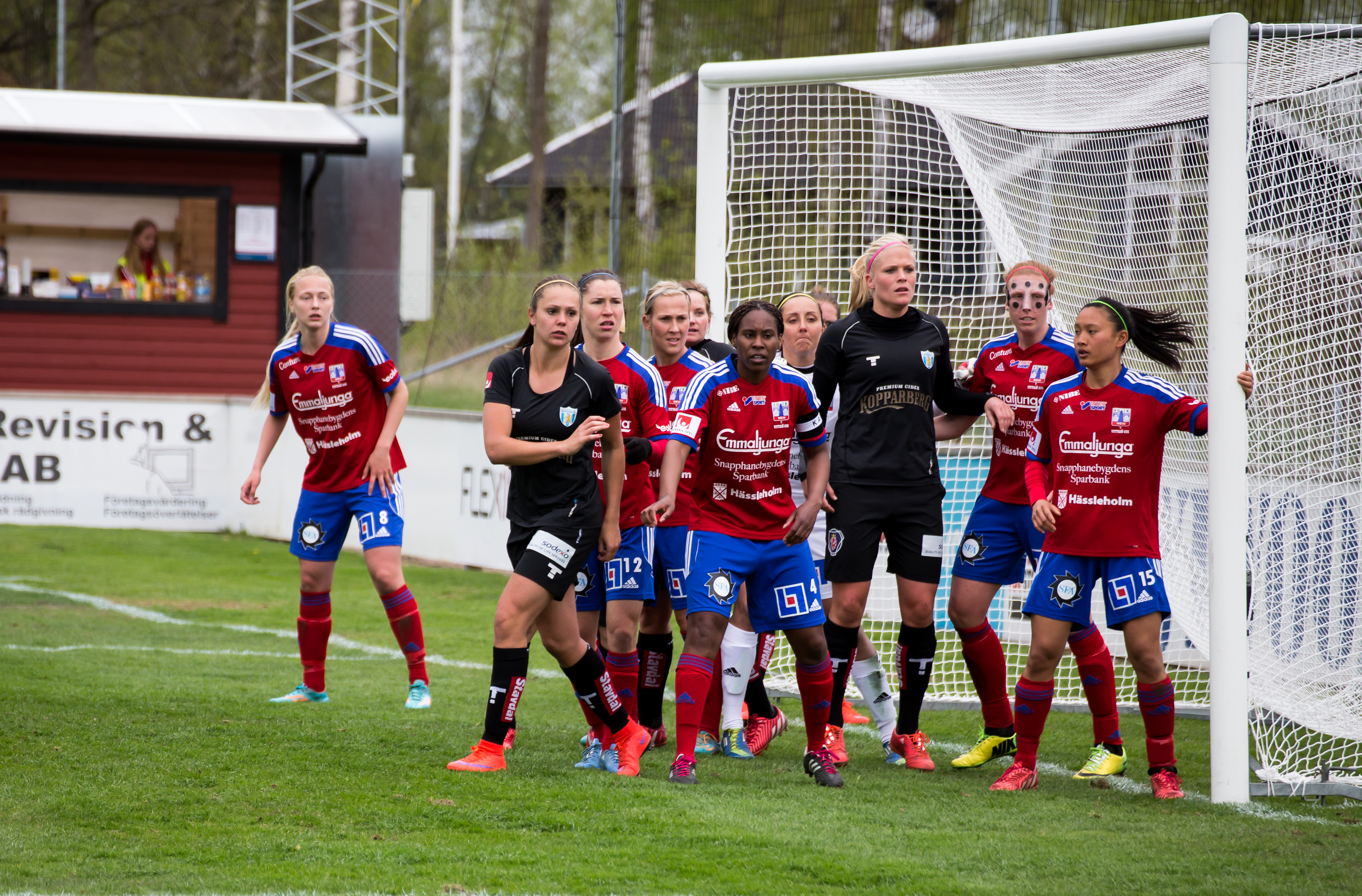
Pao guarding the post for Vittsjö GIK

=== Vittsjö GIK ===
Pao was the 24th selection in the 2014 NWSL College Draft by Sky Blue FC, but went to play for Vittsjö GIK in Sweden instead.

=== Nojima Stella ===
In February 2016, Japan Women's Football League Division 2 club Nojima Stella announced that the club had signed Pao. Pao finished the 2016 season as the top scorer with 11 goals in the 2016 L. League Division 2. Nojima Stella Kanagawa Sagamihara finished first in the Division 2 and thus promoted first in history to the Division 1.

On 8 December 2017, Pao announced her retirement from professional football at the end of the 2017 season.

=== Return to Taiwan ===
In 2018, Pao signed for Taichung Blue Whale in the Taiwan Mulan Football League. The move lasted until her retirement three years later.

== International ==
Michelle Pao played for Chinese Taipei women's national football team in 2016 AFC Women's Olympic Qualifying Tournament and scored a goal in the second round against Jordan women's national football team.

== International goals ==
No.	Date	Venue	Opponent	Score	Result	Competition
1.	16 September 2015	Mandalarthiri Stadium, Mandalay, Myanmar	Jordan	2–0	3–0	2016 AFC Women's Olympic Qualifying Tournament
2.	8 November 2016	Hong Kong Football Club Stadium, Hong Kong	Hong Kong	3–0	5–0	2017 EAFF E-1 Football Championship
3.	11 November 2016	Hong Kong Football Club Stadium, Hong Kong	Guam	3–1	8–1	2017 EAFF E-1 Football Championship
4.	5 April 2017	Faisal Al-Husseini International Stadium, Al-Ram, Palestine	Palestine	1–0	5–0	2018 AFC Women's Asian Cup qualification
5.	5 April 2017	Faisal Al-Husseini International Stadium, Al-Ram, Palestine	Palestine	3–0	5–0	2018 AFC Women's Asian Cup qualification
6.	19 August 2018	Gelora Sriwijaya Stadium, Palembang, Indonesia	Indonesia	4–0	4–0	2018 Asian Games
7.	21 August 2018	Bumi Sriwijaya Stadium, Palembang, Indonesia	Maldives	5–0	7–0	2018 Asian Games
8.	6 November 2018	Hisor Stadium, Hisor, Tajikistan	Tajikistan	1–0	9–0	2020 AFC Women's Olympic Qualifying Tournament
9.	6 November 2018	Hisor Stadium, Hisor, Tajikistan	Tajikistan	2–0	9–0	2020 AFC Women's Olympic Qualifying Tournament
10.	8 November 2018	Hisor Stadium, Hisor, Tajikistan	Mongolia	1–0	9–0	2020 AFC Women's Olympic Qualifying Tournament
11.	11 November 2018	Hisor Stadium, Hisor, Tajikistan	Singapore	2–0	10–0	2020 AFC Women's Olympic Qualifying Tournament
12.	11 November 2018	Hisor Stadium, Hisor, Tajikistan	Singapore	5–0	10–0	2020 AFC Women's Olympic Qualifying Tournament
13.	11 November 2018	Hisor Stadium, Hisor, Tajikistan	Singapore	6–0	10–0	2020 AFC Women's Olympic Qualifying Tournament
14.	6 April 2019	Grand Hamad Stadium, Doha, Qatar	Philippines	1–2	4–2	2020 AFC Women's Olympic Qualifying Tournament
15.	9 April 2019	Grand Hamad Stadium, Doha, Qatar	Iran	1–0	4–0	2020 AFC Women's Olympic Qualifying Tournament
16.	9 April 2019	Grand Hamad Stadium, Doha, Qatar	Iran	4–0	4–0	2020 AFC Women's Olympic Qualifying Tournament
17.	23 February 2023	North Harbour Stadium, Auckland, New Zealand	Papua New Guinea	2–0	5–0	Friendly

== Honors ==
=== Individual ===
- 2016 L. League Division 2 : Top scorers

=== Club ===
Nojima Stella Kanagawa Sagamihara

- 2016 L. League Division 2 : Champion

== Personal ==
Michelle is the daughter of Yao-kuo Pao and Liven Lin and has two siblings, Wayne and Jessie; and attended Monta Vista High School in Cupertino, California. She graduated from Pepperdine University majoring in sports medicine.
