= Pan Shin-yu =

Taiwanese footballer (born 1997)

Personal information
- Date of birth: 3 May 1997 (age 29)
- Place of birth: Kaohsiung City, Taiwan
- Height: 1.62 m (5 ft 4 in)
- Position: Defender

Team information
- Current team: Taichung Blue Whale
- Number: 7

Senior career*
Years	Team	Apps	(Gls)
- Taichung Blue Whale

International career^{‡}
2013	Chinese Taipei U16		(4)
2018–	Chinese Taipei	3	(2)
- * Club domestic league appearances and goals ‡ National team caps and goals as of 10 February 2020

Pan Shin-yu (Chinese: 潘昕妤; born 3 May 1997) is a Taiwanese footballer who plays as a defender for Taiwan Mulan Football League club Taichung Blue Whale and the Chinese Taipei women's national team.

== International career ==
Pan Shin-yu represented Chinese Taipei at the 2013 AFC U-16 Women's Championship and the 2015 AFC U-19 Women's Championship. She capped at senior level during the 2018 Asian Games and the 2020 AFC Women's Olympic Qualifying Tournament.

== International goals ==
Scores and results list Chinese Taipei's goal tally first.

No.	Date	Venue	Opponent	Score	Result	Competition
1.	21 August 2018	Bumi Sriwijaya Stadium, Palembang, Indonesia	Maldives	2–0	7–0	2018 Asian Games
2.	21 August 2018	Bumi Sriwijaya Stadium, Palembang, Indonesia	Maldives	4–0	7–0	2018 Asian Games
