= 2017 EAFF E-1 Football Championship (women) =

EAFF E-1 サッカー選手権 2017

Tournament details
- Host country: Japan
- Dates: 8–15 December
- Teams: 4 (from 1 sub-confederation)
- Venue: 1 (in 1 host city)

Final positions
- Champions: North Korea (3rd title)
- Runners-up: Japan
- Third place: China
- Fourth place: South Korea

Tournament statistics
- Matches played: 6
- Goals scored: 15 (2.5 per match)
- Attendance: 15,135 (2,523 per match)
- Top scorer: (North Korea) Kim Yun-mi (4 goals)
- Best player: (North Korea) Kim Yun-mi

The 2017 EAFF E-1 Football Championship was the 6th edition of the women's tournament in EAFF E-1 Football Championship, the women's football championship of East Asia. It was held in Japan in December 2017.

== Team allocation ==
Based on FIFA Women's world ranking on March 25, 2016, ten teams were allocated to their particular stage. Each winner of the preliminary round progressed to the next stage.

Final Round	Second preliminary round	First preliminary round
Japan (hosts); North Korea; China	South Korea; Chinese Taipei; Hong Kong (hosts)	Guam (hosts); Macau; Mongolia (withdrew); Northern Mariana Islands (non-FIFA member)

== Venues ==
Final Round	Preliminary Round	
(Japan) Chiba	Hong Kong	(Guam) Dededo
Fukuda Denshi Arena	Hong Kong Football Club Stadium	GFA National Training Center
Capacity: 19,781	Capacity: 2,750	Capacity: 5,000

== First preliminary round ==
The first preliminary round was held in Guam.

=== Table ===
Pos	Team	Pld	W	D	L	GF	GA	GD	Pts	Qualification
1	Guam (H)	2	2	0	0	10	0	+10	6	Advance to Preliminary round 2
2	Macau (Note: Macau and Northern Mariana Islands are ranked by the disciplinary points (Macau: no yellow or red card, Northern Mariana Islands: two yellow cards and no red card).)	2	0	1	1	0	5	−5	1	
3	Northern Mariana Islands	2	0	1	1	0	5	−5	1	

Source: EAFF.com
(H) Hosts

=== Matches ===
- All times are local (UTC+10).
29 June 2016
17:00

Guam	5–0	Macau
Johnson 12'; Kaufman 18', 48'; Surber 22'; Perez 42'	Report

GFA National Training Center, Dededo

1 July 2016
17:00

Macau	0–0	Northern Mariana Islands
	Report

GFA National Training Center, Dededo

3 July 2016
17:00

Guam	5–0	Northern Mariana Islands
Surber 30', 74'; Kaufman 43'; Willter 44'; Perez 90'	Report

GFA National Training Center, Dededo

=== Awards ===
Top Scorer	Most Valuable Player
(Guam) Samantha Kaufman (Guam) Paige Surber	(Guam) Samantha Kaufman

== Second preliminary round ==
The second preliminary round was held from 8–14 November 2016 in Hong Kong.

=== Table ===
Pos	Team	Pld	W	D	L	GF	GA	GD	Pts	Qualification
1	South Korea	3	3	0	0	36	0	+36	9	Advance to Final Round
2	Chinese Taipei	3	2	0	1	13	10	+3	6	
3	Hong Kong (H)	3	1	0	2	1	19	−18	3	
4	Guam	3	0	0	3	1	22	−21	0	

Source: EAFF.com
(H) Hosts

=== Matches ===
- All times are local (UTC+8).
8 November 2016
11:30

Guam	0–13	South Korea
	Report	Jung Seol-bin 9', 23', 33', 48'; Moon Mi-ra 15', 26'; Lee Min-a 40' (pen.), 79'; Kang Yu-mi 55'; Jang Sel-gi 61'; Lee Geum-min 64'; Kwon Eun-som 71'; Cho So-hyun 86'

Hong Kong Football Club Stadium, Hong Kong
Attendance: 365
Referee: Shiva Yari (Iran)
8 November 2016
14:30

Hong Kong	0–5	Chinese Taipei
	Report	Lin Ya-han 6', 19'; Pao Hsin-hsuan 31'; Lee Hsiu-chin 64'; Chen Yen-ping 87'

Hong Kong Football Club Stadium, Hong Kong
Attendance: 365
Referee: Công Thị Dung (Vietnam)

11 November 2016
11:30

Hong Kong	0–14	South Korea
	Report	Lee Geum-min 11', 70', 72'; Lee Young-ju 19', 56'; Lee Min-a 23' (pen.); Lee Hyun-young 28', 54'; Wong So Han 35' (o.g.); Choe Yu-ri 61'; Cheung Wai Ki 66' (o.g.); Kwon Eun-som 69'; Jang Sel-gi 75'; Lee So-dam 84' (pen.)

Hong Kong Football Club Stadium, Hong Kong
Referee: Edita Mirabidova (Uzbekistan)
11 November 2016
14:30

Chinese Taipei	8–1	Guam
Lai Li-chin 2', 42'; Lee Hsiu-chin 29'; Pao Hsin-hsuan 39'; Lin Ya-han 40', 82', 85'; Yu Hsiu-chin 47'	Report	Surber 12'

Hong Kong Football Club Stadium, Hong Kong
Attendance: 371
Referee: Fusako Kajiyama (Japan)

14 November 2016
11:30

Hong Kong	1–0	Guam
Cheung Wai Ki 13'	Report

Hong Kong Football Club Stadium, Hong Kong
Referee: Công Thị Dung (Vietnam)
14 November 2016
14:30

South Korea	9–0	Chinese Taipei
Lee Min-a 13'; Kang Yu-mi 18', 66'; Jang Sel-gi 37'; Lee Geum-min 39'; Jung Seol-bin 60'; Moon Mi-ra 68'; Choe Yu-ri 78'; Cho So-hyun 81'	Report

Hong Kong Football Club Stadium, Hong Kong
Referee: Fusako Kajiyama (Japan)

=== Awards ===
Top Scorer	Most Valuable Player
(South Korea) Jung Seol-bin (South Korea) Lee Geum-min (Chinese Taipei) Lin Ya-han	(South Korea) Lee Min-a

== Final tournament ==
The final competition was held in Japan from 8 to 15 December 2017.

=== Table ===
Pos	Team	Pld	W	D	L	GF	GA	GD	Pts	Result
1	North Korea (C)	3	3	0	0	5	0	+5	9	Champions
2	Japan (H)	3	2	0	1	4	4	0	6	Runners-up
3	China	3	1	0	2	3	4	−1	3	Third place
4	South Korea	3	0	0	3	3	7	−4	0	Fourth place

Source: EAFF.com
(C) Champions; (H) Hosts

=== Matches ===
- All times are local (UTC+9).
8 December 2017
16:10

China	0–2	North Korea
	Report	Kim Yun-mi 24', 78'

Fukuda Denshi Arena, Chiba
Attendance: 1,201
Referee: Thein Thein Aye (Myanmar)
8 December 2017
18:55

Japan	3–2	South Korea
Tanaka 8'; Nakajima 71'; Iwabuchi 83'	Report	Cho So-hyun 14' (pen.); Han Chae-rin 80'

Fukuda Denshi Arena, Chiba
Attendance: 3,080
Referee: Kate Jacewicz (Australia)
11 December 2017
16:10

North Korea	1–0	South Korea
Kim Yun-mi 18'	Report

Fukuda Denshi Arena, Chiba
Attendance: 1,514
Referee: Mahsa Ghorbani (Iran)
11 December 2017
18:55

Japan	1–0	China
Tanaka 20'	Report

Fukuda Denshi Arena, Chiba
Attendance: 3,163
Referee: Công Thị Dung (Vietnam)
15 December 2017
16:10

South Korea	1–3	China
Kang Yu-mi 85'	Report	Wang Shanshan 18'; Kim Do-yeon 35' (o.g.); Ren Guixin 90'

Fukuda Denshi Arena, Chiba
Attendance: 950
Referee: Edita Mirabidova (Uzbekistan)
15 December 2017
18:55

Japan	0–2	North Korea
	Report	Kim Yun-mi 65'; Ri Hyang-sim 82'

Fukuda Denshi Arena, Chiba
Attendance: 5,227
Referee: Kate Jacewicz (Australia)

=== Awards ===
Best Goalkeeper	Best Defender	Top Scorer	Most Valuable Player
(North Korea) Kim Myong-sun	(North Korea) Kim Nam-hui	(North Korea) Kim Yun-mi	(North Korea) Kim Yun-mi

=== Goals ===
4 goals

- (North Korea) Kim Yun-mi

2 goals

- (Japan) Mina Tanaka

1 goals

- (China) Ren Guixin
- (China) Wang Shanshan
- (Japan) Emi Nakajima
- (Japan) Mana Iwabuchi
- (North Korea) Ri Hyang-sim
- (South Korea) Cho So-hyun
- (South Korea) Han Chae-rin
- (South Korea) Kang Yu-mi

1 own goals

- (South Korea) Kim Do-yeon

== Final ranking ==
Pos	Team	Pld	W	D	L	GF	GA	GD	Pts	Final result
1	North Korea	3	3	0	0	5	0	+5	9	Champions
2	Japan	3	2	0	1	4	4	0	6	Runners-up
3	China	3	1	0	2	3	4	−1	3	Third place
4	South Korea	6	3	0	3	39	7	+32	9	Fourth place
5	Chinese Taipei	3	2	0	1	13	10	+3	6	Eliminated in Second Preliminary Round
6	Hong Kong	3	1	0	2	1	19	−18	3	Eliminated in Second Preliminary Round
7	Guam	5	2	0	3	11	22	−11	6	Eliminated in Second Preliminary Round
8	Macau	2	0	1	1	0	5	−5	1	Eliminated in First Preliminary Round
9	Northern Mariana Islands	2	0	1	1	0	5	−5	1	Eliminated in First Preliminary Round

Source: EAFF.com

Per statistical convention in football, matches decided in extra time are counted as wins and losses, while matches decided by penalty shoot-out are counted as draws.

== Broadcasting rights ==
- China: CCTV, PPTV and Guangdong Sports
- Japan: Fuji TV
- South Korea: SPOTV
