= Nien Ching-yun =

Taiwanese footballer

Personal information
- Date of birth: 18 February 2002 (age 24)
- Place of birth: Taipei, Taiwan
- Position: Midfielder

Senior career*
Years	Team	Apps	(Gls)
2019	Taipei Bravo		
2020–2025	Taichung Blue Whale		(6)

International career^{‡}
2015–2016	Chinese Taipei U14		(2)
2017	Chinese Taipei U16	5	(5)
2018	Chinese Taipei U19	3	(0)
2019–	Chinese Taipei	3	(0)
- * Club domestic league appearances and goals ‡ National team caps and goals as of 10 February 2020

Nien Ching-yun (Chinese: 粘菁云; born 18 February 2002) is a Taiwanese footballer who plays as a midfielder for Taiwan Mulan Football League club Taichung Blue Whale and the Chinese Taipei women's national team.
