= Li Pei-jung =

Taiwanese footballer

Personal information
- Date of birth: 25 April 2000 (age 26)
- Place of birth: Taichung, Taiwan
- Height: 1.64 m (5 ft 5 in)
- Position: Defender

Team information
- Current team: Taichung Blue Whale
- Number: 22

Senior career*
Years	Team	Apps	(Gls)
- Taichung Blue Whale

International career^{‡}
2014	Chinese Taipei U14		(1)
2019–	Chinese Taipei	6	(0)
- Chinese Taipei (futsal)
- * Club domestic league appearances and goals ‡ National team caps and goals as of 10 February 2020

Li Pei-jung (Chinese: 李佩容; born 25 April 2000) is a Taiwanese footballer who plays as a defender for Taiwan Mulan Football League club Taichung Blue Whale and the Chinese Taipei women's national team.

== International career ==
Li Pei-jung represented Chinese Taipei at the 2014 AFC U-14 Girls' Regional Championship. She capped at senior level during the 2019 EAFF E-1 Football Championship (final round) and the 2020 AFC Women's Olympic Qualifying Tournament (third round).
