= Lin Kai-ling =

Taiwanese footballer

Personal information
- Date of birth: 21 September 1991 (age 35)
- Position: Defender

Team information
- Current team: Hualien
- Number: 21

Senior career*
Years	Team	Apps	(Gls)
- Hualien

International career^{‡}
2013–2018	Chinese Taipei	15	(2)
- * Club domestic league appearances and goals ‡ National team caps and goals as of 5 December 2018

Lin Kai-ling (Chinese: 林凱玲; born 21 September 1991) is a Taiwanese footballer who plays as a defender for Taiwan Mulan Football League club Hualien FC. She has been a member of the Chinese Taipei women's national team.

== International goals ==
No.	Date	Venue	Opponent	Score	Result	Competition
1.	10 March 2014	Umag Stadium, Umag, Croatia	Belarus	2–0	2–0	2014 Istria Cup
2.	30 August 2014	Hsinchu County Stadium, Hsinchu County, Taiwan	Hong Kong	1–0	2–0	Friendly
3.	30 August 2014	Hsinchu County Stadium, Hsinchu County, Taiwan	Hong Kong	2–0	2–0	Friendly
4.	11 November 2018	Hisor Central Stadium, Hisor, Tajikistan	Singapore	7–0	10–0	2020 AFC Women's Olympic Qualifying Tournament
