= Taipei Municipal Stadium =

Sports venue in Taipei, Taiwan

Coordinates: 25°2′58″N 121°33′4″E

Taipei Municipal Stadium 臺北田徑場
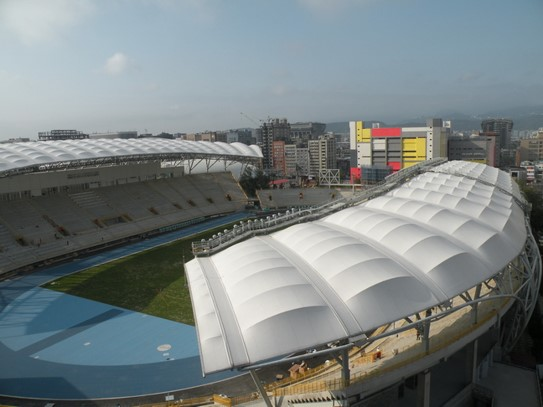
- Interactive map of Taipei Municipal Stadium 臺北田徑場
- Full name: Taipei Municipal "Track and Field" Stadium
- Location: Taipei, Taiwan
- Owner: Taipei City Government
- Capacity: 20,000
- Surface: Grass

Construction
- Built: 2009
- Opened: 2009
- Cost: NT$ 423 million
- Architect: Archasia

Tenants
- Taipei Bravo PlayOne; Tatung; Chinese Taipei national football team Chinese Taipei national rugby union team

Taipei Municipal Stadium
- Traditional Chinese: 臺北田徑場 or 台北田徑場
- Tongyong Pinyin: Táiběi tiánjìngchǎng
Transcriptions
Standard Mandarin
- Hanyu Pinyin: Táiběi tiánjìngchǎng
- Tongyong Pinyin: Táiběi tiánjìngchǎng
- IPA: [tʰǎɪpèɪ tʰjɛ̌ntɕîŋʈʂʰàŋ]
Southern Min
- Hokkien POJ: Tâi-pak chhân-kèng-tiûⁿ

The Taipei Municipal Stadium (Chinese: 臺北田徑場 or 台北田徑場; pinyin: Táiběi Tiánjìng Chǎng) is a multi-purpose stadium in Taipei, Taiwan. The original stadium, built in 1956, was used mostly for track and field events.

The stadium was demolished and reconstructed for the 2009 Summer Deaflympics between December 2006 and July 2009. The new stadium is able to hold 20,000 people. On 3 July 2011, the stadium recorded its highest attendance for a football game when Chinese Taipei hosted Malaysia in the 2014 FIFA World Cup qualification - AFC first round second leg match, when 15,335 spectators attended the game. In 2013, 500 people showed up at the stadium for a domestic league match between association football clubs Taipower FC and Tatung FC.

The stadium is accessible from the Taipei Arena station of the Taipei Metro.

== International matches ==
Date	Competition
5 Sep 2009	2009 Summer Deaflympics
19 Aug 2017	2017 Summer Universiade

== See also ==
- List of stadiums in Taiwan

Preceded by Gwangju World Cup Stadium; Gwangju	Summer Universiade; Opening and Closing Ceremonies; 2017	Succeeded by Stadio San Paolo; Naples

Preceded by Government Stadium; Hong Kong	AFC Women's Championship; Final Venue; 1977	Succeeded by Corporation Stadium (India) Calicut
