= Bumi Sriwijaya Stadium =

Multi-purpose Stadium in Palembang, Indonesia

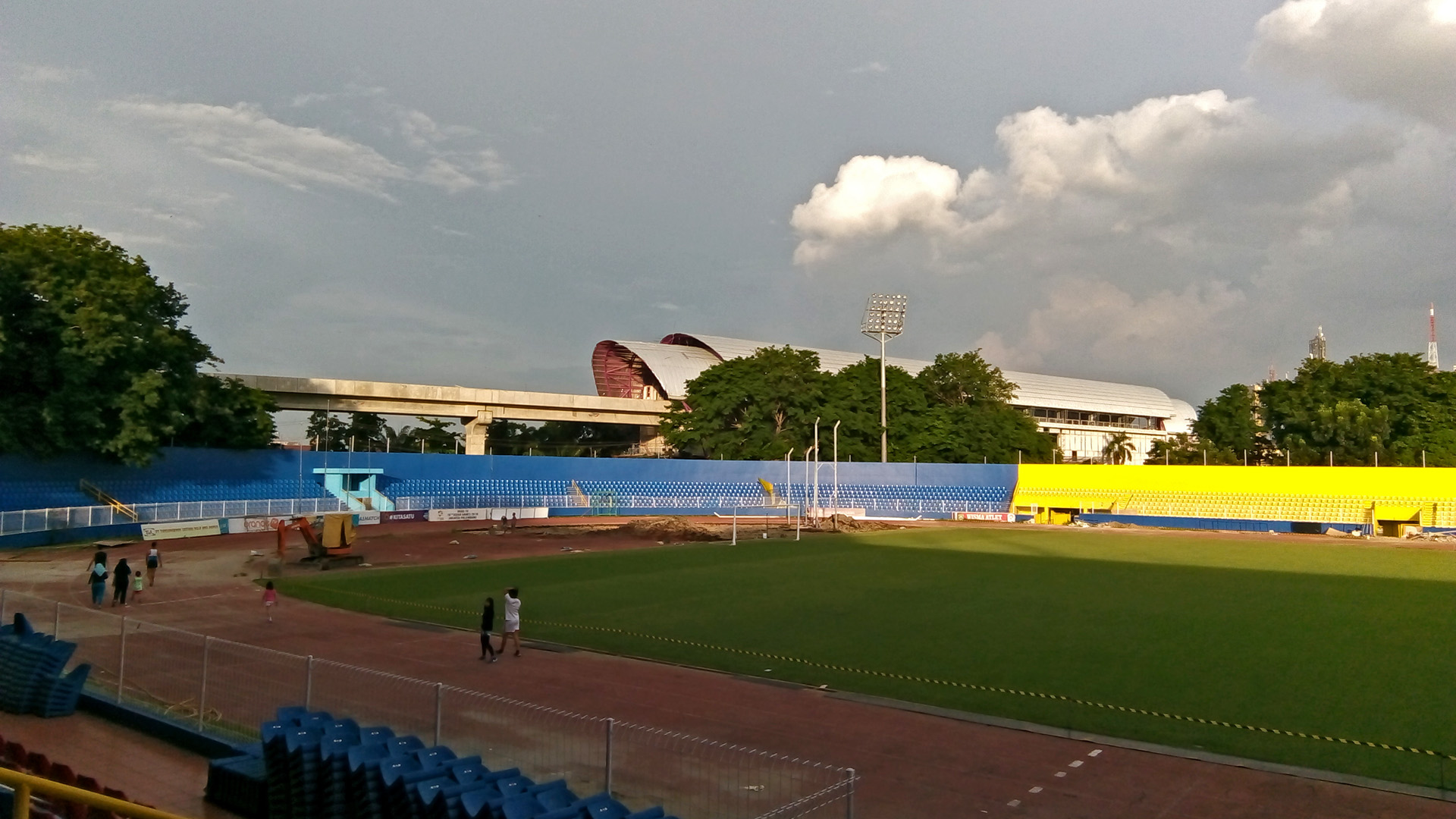
- Inside view of the stadium

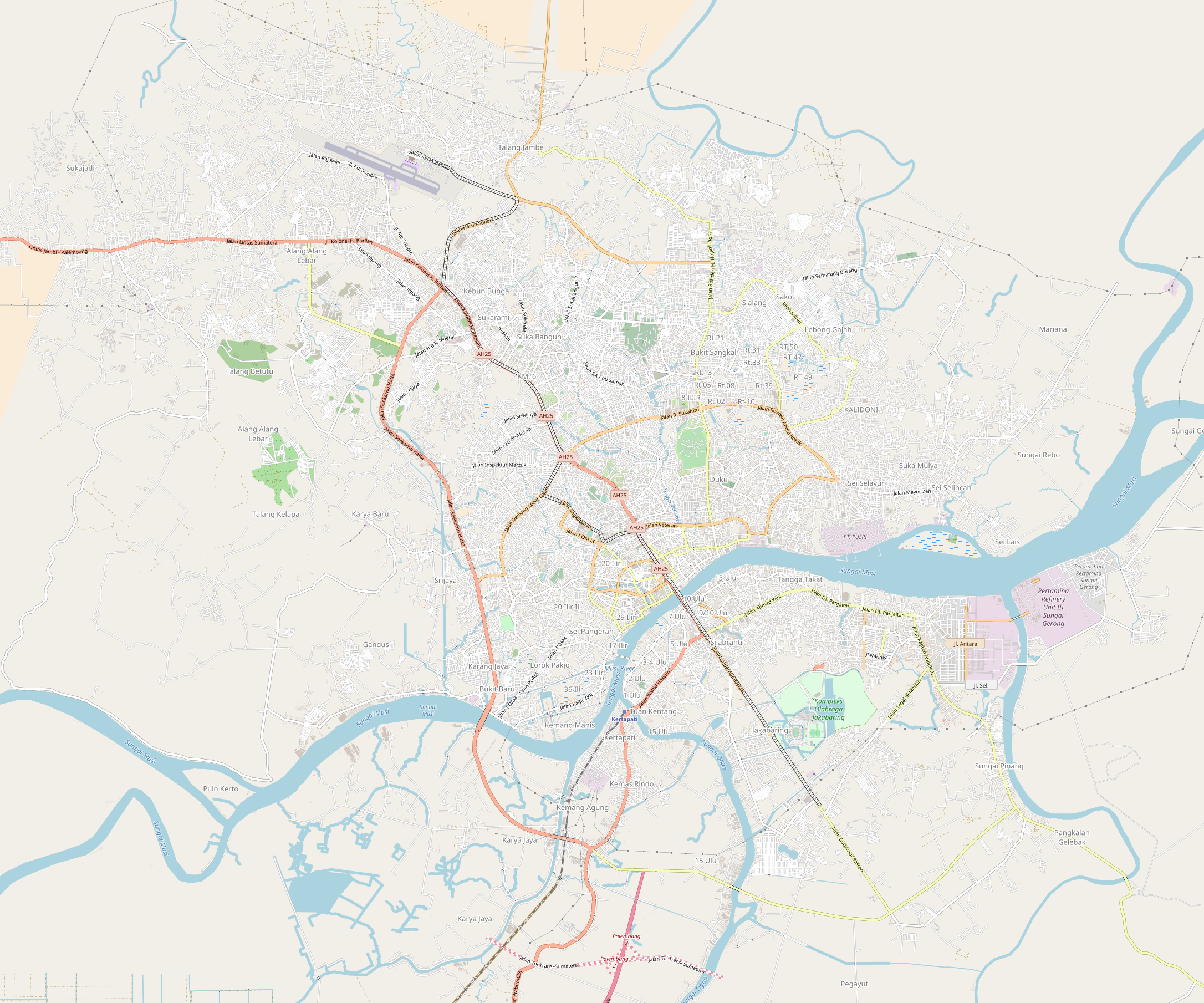
- Location in Palembang
- Location: Palembang, South Sumatra, Indonesia
- Coordinates: 2.9775°S 104.7440°E
- Owner: Government of Palembang City
- Operator: Government of Palembang City
- Capacity: 6,026
- Surface: Grass
- Public transit: Bumi Sriwijaya

Construction
- Renovated: 2012, 2017, 2024-2025

Tenants
- PS Palembang; Sriwijaya FC (2017); Sumsel United

Bumi Sriwijaya Stadium (Indonesian: Stadion Bumi Sriwijaya) is a multi-purpose stadium in Palembang, South Sumatra, Indonesia. It is currently used mostly for football matches. It is the host of PS Palembang and Sriwijaya FC. The stadium has a capacity of 15,000 spectators and after its renovation in 2017 and 2024 the capacity was decreased into 6,026 spectators and all seater. The Stadium Serves as one of the Venue for Women's Football in 2018 Asian Games.

== Access ==
The stadium is located in the middle of the city and surrounded by malls and hospital. Public transportation access to the stadium includes:

- Palembang Light Rail Transit Bumi Sriwijaya Station
- Trans Musi PS Mall – Plaju Route
- Angkot Perumnas – Ampera Bridge Route
