= 2018 Taichung Blue Whale season =

Taichung Blue Whale
2018 season
- Head coach: Lu Kuei-hua
- Stadium: Taiyuan Football Field
- TMFL: Winners
- Top goalscorer: League: Lee Hsiu-chin (15); All: Lee Hsiu-chin (17)
- Biggest win: Taichung Blue Whale 6–1 Kaohsiung Sunny Bank
- Biggest defeat: Taipei PlayOne 3–0 Taichung Blue Whale

The 2018 Taichung Blue Whale season was the club's 5th season and their 5th season in Taiwan Mulan Football League.

== Kits ==
- Supplier: Adidas
- Main Sponsor: Taichung World Flora Exposition

== Management team ==
Position	Name
Head coach	(Chinese Taipei) Lu Kuei-hua
Assistant coaches	(Chinese Taipei) Chang Wei-chen, (Chinese Taipei) Huang Yan-ting, (Chinese Taipei) Lai Li-chin
Goalkeeping coach	(Chinese Taipei) Liu Shih-hua
Athletic trainer	(Chinese Taipei) Hong Chia-ling

- Last updated: 30 June 2024

== Players ==
N	Pos.	Nat.	Name	Age.	Since
Goalkeepers
1	GK	(Chinese Taipei)	Tsai Ming-jung	29	2018
18	GK	(Chinese Taipei)	Cheng Ssu-yu	29	2014
Defenders
4	DF	(Chinese Taipei)	Lai Wei-ju	24	2014
6	DF	(Chinese Taipei)	Chang Wei-chen	29	2016
12	DF	(Chinese Taipei)	Wu Yu	20	2018
13	DF	(Chinese Taipei)	Tseng Wen-ting	22	2015
15	DF	(Chinese Taipei)	Wang Shu-wen	17	2018
22	DF	(Chinese Taipei)	Yu Shu-fang	23	2016
Midfielders
2	MF	(Chinese Taipei)	Chang Chi-lan	22	2014
8	MF	(Chinese Taipei)	Yang Ssu-wei	22	2014
9	MF	(Chinese Taipei)	Tsou Hsin-ni	23	2014
14	MF	(Chinese Taipei)	Yang Chia-hui	21	2017
16	MF	(Chinese Taipei)	Hou Fang-wei	26	2014
19	MF	(Chinese Taipei)	Kao Pei-ling	21	2018
20	MF	(Chinese Taipei)	Tuan Yu-jou	22	2015
23	MF	(Chinese Taipei)	Liu Chien-yun	26	2014
Forwards
3	FW	(Chinese Taipei)	Su Yu-hsuan	17	2016
5	FW	(Chinese Taipei)	Pao Hsin-hsuan	26	2018
7	FW	(Chinese Taipei)	Tang Yung-ching	23	2014
10	FW	(Chinese Taipei)	Lee Hsiu-chin	26	2014
11	FW	(Chinese Taipei)	Lai Li-chin (captain)	30	2015
17	FW	(Chinese Taipei)	Ho Hsuan-yi	22	2016
21	FW	(Chinese Taipei)	Chen Hsiu-wen		2017

- Ordered by squad number.

== Transfers ==
=== In ===
No.	Pos.	Player	Transferred from	Source
Preseason
1	GK	Tsai Ming-jung	(Chinese Taipei) Hsinchu	
5	FW	Pao Hsin-hsuan	(Japan) Nojima Stella Kanagawa Sagamihara	
12	DF	Wu Yu	—	
15	DF	Wang Shu-wen	—	
19	MF	Kao Pei-ling	—	

=== Out ===
No.	Pos.	Player	Transferred to	Source
Preseason
5	DF	Lai Yi-ju	—	
12	DF	Hsu Chih-ting	—	
15	DF	Cheng Ya-hsun	(Chinese Taipei) Kaohsiung Sunny Bank	
18	GK	Wang Yu-ting	—	
19	MF	Chuang Shu-Mei	—	

== Preseason and friendlies ==
30 September 2018 Friendly	Taichung Blue Whale (Chinese Taipei)	6–3	(Hong Kong) Citizen	Taichung
16:00 (UTC+8)				Stadium: Taiyuan Football Field

== Competitions ==
=== Overall record ===
Competition	First match	Last match	Starting round	Final position	Record							
Competition	First match	Last match	Starting round	Final position	Pld	W	D	L	GF	GA	GD	Win %
Taiwan Mulan Football League	14 April 2018	20 October 2018	Matchday 1	Winners	14	12	0	2	42	13	+29	85.71
Total					14	12	0	2	42	13	+29	85.71

=== Taiwan Mulan Football League ===
==== League table ====
Pos	Team	Pld	W	D	L	GF	GA	GD	Pts	Qualification or relegation
1	Taichung Blue Whale (Q)	12	10	0	2	38	13	+25	30	Qualification for the Mulan League Finals
2	Taipei PlayOne (Q)	12	9	0	3	31	17	+14	27	Qualification for the Mulan League Finals
3	Hualien	12	8	0	4	34	21	+13	24	
4	Kaohsiung Sunny Bank	12	2	1	9	17	34	−17	7	
5	Inter New Taipei	12	0	1	11	11	46	−35	1	

(Q) Qualified for the phase indicated

==== Results by round ====
Round	1	2	3	4	5	6	7	8	9	10	11	12	13	14	15
Result	W	W	W	W		W	W		W	W	W		L	L	W
Position	1	1	1	1	1	1	1	1	1	1	1	1	1	1	1

W = Win; D = Draw; L = Loss

==== Matches ====
14 April 2018 1	Hualien	1–5	Taichung Blue Whale	New Taipei
14:00 (UTC+8)	Wu Shih-ping 55'	Report	Lee Hsiu-chin 27', 45+1'; Pao Hsin-hsuan 33'; Ho Hsuan-yi 62'; Lai Li-chin 85'	Stadium: Fu Jen Catholic University; Attendance: 200

21 April 2018 2	Taichung Blue Whale	5–1	Taipei PlayOne	Taichung
16:30 (UTC+8)	Ho Hsuan-yi 2'; Pao Hsin-hsuan 20', 81'; Lee Hsiu-chin 30'; Tang Yung-ching 88'	Report	Tuan Yu-jou 71' (o.g.)	Stadium: Taiyuan Football Field; Attendance: 580; Referee: Kuo Chan-yu

28 April 2018 3	Taichung Blue Whale	5–1	Inter New Taipei	Taichung
16:30 (UTC+8)	Pao Hsin-hsuan 24', 29', 84'; Yang Ssu-wei 66'; Ho Hsuan-yi 71'	Report	Chen Hsin-jou 77'	Stadium: Taiyuan Football Field; Attendance: 540; Referee: Wang Chieh

5 May 2018 4	Taichung Blue Whale	2–1	Kaohsiung Sunny Bank	Hualien
14:00 (UTC+8)	Lai Li-chin 21'; Pao Hsin-hsuan 36'			Stadium: Hualien Stadium

20 May 2018 6	Inter New Taipei	0–4	Taichung Blue Whale	Hualien
14:00 (UTC+8)		Report	Lee Hsiu-chin 45', 55'; Lai Li-chin 67'; Yang Ssu-wei 85'	Stadium: Hualien Stadium; Referee: Wang Chieh

10 June 2018 7	Kaohsiung Sunny Bank	0–3	Taichung Blue Whale	Kaohsiung
16:30 (UTC+8)		Report	Ho Hsuan-yi 36'; Lee Hsiu-chin 37', 41'	Stadium: National Stadium; Referee: Wang Chieh

23 June 2018 9	Taichung Blue Whale	1–0	Hualien	Taipei
14:00 (UTC+8)	Ho Hsuan-yi 61'	Report		Stadium: Taipei Municipal Stadium; Attendance: 100

1 July 2018 10	Taichung Blue Whale	2–0	Taipei PlayOne	Taichung
17:30 (UTC+8)	Lee Hsiu-chin 6', 80'			Stadium: Taiyuan Football Field

7 July 2018 11	Taichung Blue Whale	4–2	Inter New Taipei	Hualien
14:00 (UTC+8)	Su Yu-hsuan 16', 32', 67'; Lee Hsiu-chin 76'		Chen Hsin-jou 38'; Sako 76'	Stadium: Hualien Stadium

8 September 2018 13	Taipei PlayOne	3–0	Taichung Blue Whale	Taipei
16:00 (UTC+8)	Ting Chi 10'; Chen Yen-ping 63'; Pan Yen-hsin 90+1'	Report		Stadium: Taipei Municipal Stadium; Attendance: 580; Referee: Lee Yi-chi

15 September 2018 14	Taichung Blue Whale	1–3	Hualien	New Taipei
14:00 (UTC+8)	Lee Hsiu-chin 85'	Report	Lin Kai-ling 9' (pen.), 13' (pen.); Zhuo Li-ping 57'	Stadium: Fu Jen Catholic University; Attendance: 100; Referee: Kuo Chia-hao

22 September 2018 15	Taichung Blue Whale	6–1	Kaohsiung Sunny Bank	Taichung
16:30 (UTC+8)	Ho Hsuan-yi *2; Lee Hsiu-chin *4			Stadium: Taiyuan Football Field; Attendance: 400

==== Mulan League Finals ====
12 October 2018 1st leg	Taipei PlayOne	0–2	Taichung Blue Whale	Taipei
19:00 (UTC+8)		Report	Pao Hsin-hsuan 45' (pen.); Lee Hsiu-chin 75'	Stadium: Taipei Municipal Stadium; Attendance: 300; Referee: Wang Chieh

20 October 2018 2nd leg	Taichung Blue Whale	2–0	Taipei PlayOne	Taichung
15:00 (UTC+8)	Lee Hsiu-chin 25'; Pao Hsin-hsuan 82'	Recap		Stadium: Taiyuan Football Field

== Statistics ==
=== Goalscorers ===
Rank	No.	Pos.	Nat.	Player	TMFL	Finals	Total
1	10	FW	(Chinese Taipei)	Lee Hsiu-chin	15	2	17
2	5	FW	(Chinese Taipei)	Pao Hsin-hsuan	7	2	9
3	17	FW	(Chinese Taipei)	Ho Hsuan-yi	7	0	7
4	3	FW	(Chinese Taipei)	Su Yu-hsuan	3	0	3
4	11	FW	(Chinese Taipei)	Lai Li-chin	3	0	3
6	8	MF	(Chinese Taipei)	Yang Ssu-wei	2	0	2
7	7	FW	(Chinese Taipei)	Tang Yung-ching	1	0	1
Own goals (from the opponents)					0	0	0
Totals					38	4	42

=== Hat-tricks ===
Player	Against	Result	Date	Competition	Ref
(Chinese Taipei) Pao Hsin-hsuan	Inter New Taipei	5–1	28 April 2018	Taiwan Mulan Football League	
(Chinese Taipei) Su Yu-hsuan	Inter New Taipei	4–2	7 July 2018	Taiwan Mulan Football League	
(Chinese Taipei) Lee Hsiu-chin	Kaohsiung Sunny Bank	6–1	22 September 2018	Taiwan Mulan Football League	

=== Cleansheets ===
Rank	No.	Nat.	Player	TMFL	Finals	Total
1	1	(Chinese Taipei)	Tsai Ming-jung	2	2	4
2	18	(Chinese Taipei)	Cheng Ssu-yu	2	–	2
Totals				4	2	6

== Awards ==
Player	Position	Award	Ref.
(Chinese Taipei) Lee Hsiu-chin	Forward	Golden Boot	
(Chinese Taipei) Lu Kuei-hua	Head coach	Coach of the Year	
