= 2019 Taichung Blue Whale season =

Taichung Blue Whale
2019 season
- Head coach: Lu Kuei-hua
- Stadium: Taiyuan Football Field
- TMFL: Winners
- Top goalscorer: League: Lee Hsiu-chin (19); All: Lee Hsiu-chin (21)
- Biggest win: Inter Taipei 1–9 Taichung Blue Whale

The 2019 Taichung Blue Whale season was the club's 6th season and their 6th season in Taiwan Mulan Football League.

== Kits ==
- Supplier: Adidas
- Main Sponsor: Dah Lih Puh

== Management team ==
Position	Name
Head coach	(Chinese Taipei) Lu Kuei-hua
Assistant coaches	(Chinese Taipei) Chang Wei-chen, (Chinese Taipei) Huang Yan-ting, (Chinese Taipei) Lai Li-chin
Goalkeeping coach	(Chinese Taipei) Chang Po-hsiang
Athletic trainer	(Chinese Taipei) Hong Chia-ling

- Last updated: 27 June 2024

== Players ==
N	Pos.	Nat.	Name	Age.	Since
Goalkeepers
1	GK	(Chinese Taipei)	Chen Miao-wen		2019
18	GK	(Chinese Taipei)	Cheng Ssu-yu	30	2014
Defenders
4	DF	(Chinese Taipei)	Lai Wei-ju	25	2014
6	DF	(Chinese Taipei)	Chang Wei-chen	30	2016
12	DF	(Chinese Taipei)	Wu Yu	21	2018
13	DF	(Chinese Taipei)	Tseng Wen-ting	23	2015
14	DF	(Chinese Taipei)	Cheng Wen-ching		2019
15	DF	(Chinese Taipei)	Wang Shu-wen	18	2018
17	DF	(Chinese Taipei)	Lee Pei-lin		2019
19	DF	(Chinese Taipei)	Yang Hsin-ju	19	2019
20	DF	(Chinese Taipei)	Chen Yu-tung		2019
22	DF	(Chinese Taipei)	Li Pei-jung	19	2019
Midfielders
2	MF	(Chinese Taipei)	Chang Chi-lan	23	2014
8	MF	(Chinese Taipei)	Hsieh Cheng-ya	20	2019
9	MF	(Chinese Taipei)	Lin Yu-syuan	16	2019
16	MF	(Chinese Taipei)	Hou Fang-wei	27	2014
21	MF	(Japan)	Maho Tanaka	18	2019
23	MF	(Chinese Taipei)	Liu Chien-yun	27	2014
Forwards
3	FW	(Chinese Taipei)	Su Yu-hsuan	18	2016
5	FW	(Chinese Taipei)	Pao Hsin-hsuan	27	2018
7	FW	(Chinese Taipei)	Tang Yung-ching	24	2014
10	FW	(Chinese Taipei)	Lee Hsiu-chin (captain)	27	2014
11	FW	(Chinese Taipei)	Lai Li-chin	31	2015

- Ordered by squad number.

== Transfers ==
=== In ===
No.	Pos.	Player	Transferred from	Source
Preseason
8	MF	Hsieh Cheng-ya	—	
9	MF	Lin Yu-syuan	—	
14	MF	Tsai Meng-hsuan	—	
17	DF	Lee Pei-lin	(Chinese Taipei) Inter New Taipei	
19	DF	Yang Hsin-ju	—	
20	DF	Chen Yu-tung	—	
22	DF	Li Pei-jung	(Chinese Taipei) NTUS	
Midseason
1	GK	Chen Miao-wen	—	
14	DF	Cheng Wen-ching	—	
21	MF	Maho Tanaka	—	

=== Out ===
No.	Pos.	Player	Transferred to	Source
Preseason
8	MF	Yang Ssu-wei	(Chinese Taipei) Taipei Bravo	
9	MF	Tsou Hsin-ni	—	
14	MF	Yang Chia-hui	—	
17	FW	Ho Hsuan-yi	(Chinese Taipei) Hualien	
19	MF	Kao Pei-ling	—	
20	MF	Tuan Yu-jou	—	
22	DF	Yu Shu-fang	—	
Midseason
1	GK	Tsai Ming-jung	(Japan) Fujizakura	
14	MF	Tsai Meng-hsuan	—	
21	FW	Chen Hsiu-wen	—	

== Preseason and friendlies ==
20 August 2019 Friendly	Taichung Blue Whale (Chinese Taipei)	0–3	(Japan) Urawa Red Diamonds U18	Chiayi County
15:15 (UTC+8)				Stadium: WuFeng University

== Competitions ==
=== Overall record ===
Competition	First match	Last match	Starting round	Final position	Record							
Competition	First match	Last match	Starting round	Final position	Pld	W	D	L	GF	GA	GD	Win %
Taiwan Mulan Football League	13 April 2019	9 November 2019	Matchday 1	Winners	17	14	3	0	68	14	+54	82.35
Total					17	14	3	0	68	14	+54	82.35

=== Taiwan Mulan Football League ===
==== League table ====
Pos	Team	Pld	W	D	L	GF	GA	GD	Pts	Qualification or relegation
1	Taichung Blue Whale (Q)	15	13	2	0	63	12	+51	41	Qualification for the Mulan League Finals
2	Hualien (Q)	15	10	2	3	40	12	+28	32	Qualification for the Mulan League Finals
3	Taipei Bravo	15	4	6	5	25	21	+4	18	
4	Kaohsiung Sunny Bank	15	5	0	10	15	43	−28	15	
5	New Taipei Hang Yuen	15	3	2	10	14	33	−19	11	
6	Inter Taipei	15	3	2	10	14	50	−36	11	

(Q) Qualified for the phase indicated

==== Results by round ====
Round	1	2	3	4	5	6	7	9	10	11	12	13	14	15	8^{1}
Result	W	W	W	W	W	W	W	D	W	D	W	W	W	W	W
Position	2	1	1	1	1	1	1	1	1	1	1	1	1	1	1

W = Win; D = Draw; L = Loss

^{1} Matchday 8 was postponed to 28 September 2019 due to the national team training.

==== Matches ====
13 April 2019 1	Taichung Blue Whale	3–2	Taipei Bravo	Taichung
16:30 (UTC+8)	Lee Hsiu-chin 2', 50', 57'	Recap	Wang Yi-ting 6'; Lin Ya-hui 54' (pen.)	Stadium: Taiyuan Football Field; Referee: Huang Po-chun

20 April 2019 2	Hualien	0–1	Taichung Blue Whale	Hualien
16:30 (UTC+8)		Recap	Lai Li-chin 90+3'	Stadium: Hualien Stadium; Referee: Katharina Gerhard

27 April 2019 3	Kaohsiung Sunny Bank	0–5	Taichung Blue Whale	Kaohsiung
16:30 (UTC+8)		Recap	Pao Hsin-hsuan 50', 67'; Lai Li-chin 74'; Lee Hsiu-chin 79', 90+1'	Stadium: National Stadium; Referee: Katharina Gerhard

4 May 2019 4	Taichung Blue Whale	2–0	New Taipei Hang Yuen	Hualien
10:00 (UTC+8)	Pao Hsin-hsuan 73' (pen.), 77'	Recap		Stadium: Hualien Stadium; Referee: Huang Po-chun

11 May 2019 5	Inter Taipei	1–9	Taichung Blue Whale	Taipei
14:00 (UTC+8)	Chen Ya-chun 23'	Recap	Lee Hsiu-chin 7', 45+1'; Su Yu-hsuan 15', 20', 54'; Lin Yu-syuan 26'; Chen Juo-wei 46' (o.g.); Pao Hsin-hsuan 66', 87'	Stadium: Taipei Municipal Stadium; Referee: Ko Chuan-yao

18 May 2019 6	Taipei Bravo	0–5	Taichung Blue Whale	Kaohsiung
10:00 (UTC+8)		Recap	Su Yu-hsuan 21', 76'; Pao Hsin-hsuan 57'; Lee Hsiu-chin 79', 90+2'	Stadium: National Stadium

25 May 2019 7	Taichung Blue Whale	3–2	Hualien	Taichung
16:30 (UTC+8)	Lai Li-chin 10'; Su Yu-hsuan 16'; Hou Fang-wei 35'	Recap	Wu Shih-ping 62'; Chang Su-hsin 80'	Stadium: Taiyuan Football Field; Referee: Wang Chieh

15 June 2019 9	New Taipei Hang Yuen	2–2	Taichung Blue Whale	Kaohsiung
10:00 (UTC+8)	Li Pei-jung 32' (o.g.); Chen Hsin-jou 68'	Recap	Lee Hsiu-chin 58', 64'	Stadium: National Stadium; Referee: Kuo Po-hung

3 August 2019 10	Taichung Blue Whale	6–0	Inter Taipei	Hualien
14:00 (UTC+8)	Lee Hsiu-chin 16'; Lai Li-chin 35', 62'; Su Yu-hsuan 37'; Pao Hsin-hsuan 57', 68'	Recap		Stadium: Hualien Stadium; Referee: Wang Chieh

17 August 2019 11	Taichung Blue Whale	0–0	Taipei Bravo	Taichung
16:30 (UTC+8)		Recap		Stadium: Taiyuan Football Field; Referee: Wang Chieh

31 August 2019 12	Taichung Blue Whale	7–1	Kaohsiung Sunny Bank	New Taipei
10:00 (UTC+8)	Lee Hsiu-chin 8', 12', 28'; Hou Fang-wei 16'; Lai Li-chin 21'; Lai Wei-ju 43'; Su Yu-hsuan 87'	Recap	Chen Li-chin 80'	Stadium: Fu Jen Catholic University; Referee: Liu Hsiang-shao

7 September 2019 13	Taichung Blue Whale	6–0	New Taipei Hang Yuen	Hsinchu County
10:00 (UTC+8)	Lai Li-chin 5', 82'; Lee Hsiu-chin 14', 72'; Su Yu-hsuan 47'; Lin Yu-syuan 90+1'	Recap		Stadium: Hsinchu County Second Stadium; Referee: Hou Hung-hua

14 September 2019 14	Inter Taipei	0–6	Taichung Blue Whale	Hualien
14:00 (UTC+8)		Recap	Pao Hsin-hsuan 6', 59', 88'; Lai Li-chin 7'; Su Yu-hsuan 29'; Lee Hsiu-chin 71'	Stadium: Hualien Stadium; Referee: Lin Ching-tang

21 September 2019 15	Taichung Blue Whale	3–2	Hualien	Taichung
16:30 (UTC+8)	Liu Chien-yun 5'; Pao Hsin-hsuan 57'; Lee Hsiu-chin 62'	Recap	Zhuo Li-ping 24'; Ting Chi 32'	Stadium: Taiyuan Football Field; Referee: Kuo Po-hung

28 September 2019 8	Kaohsiung Sunny Bank	2–5	Taichung Blue Whale	New Taipei
14:00 (UTC+8)	Chang Chi-lan 18' (o.g.); Lai Wei-ju 52' (o.g.)	Recap	Tang Yung-ching 26'; Wu Yu 42'; Su Yu-hsuan 65'; Lai Li-chin 87'; Pao Hsin-hsuan 90+1'	Stadium: Fu Jen Catholic University; Referee: Yang Shu-ting

==== Mulan League Finals ====
2 November 2019 1st leg	Hualien	0–0	Taichung Blue Whale	Hualien
15:00 (UTC+8)		Recap		Stadium: Hualien Stadium; Referee: Wang Chieh

9 November 2019 2nd leg	Taichung Blue Whale	5–2	Hualien	Taichung
15:00 (UTC+8)	Lee Hsiu-chin 19', 24'; Hou Fang-wei 39'; Lai Li-chin 62', 80'	Recap	Ting Chi 5'; Lin Ya-han 45+5' (pen.)	Stadium: Taiyuan Football Field; Attendance: 600; Referee: Lee Yi-chi

== Statistics ==
=== Goalscorers ===
Rank	No.	Pos.	Nat.	Player	TMFL	Finals	Total
1	10	FW	(Chinese Taipei)	Lee Hsiu-chin	19	2	21
2	5	FW	(Chinese Taipei)	Pao Hsin-hsuan	14	0	14
3	11	FW	(Chinese Taipei)	Lai Li-chin	10	2	12
4	3	FW	(Chinese Taipei)	Su Yu-hsuan	11	0	11
5	16	MF	(Chinese Taipei)	Hou Fang-wei	2	1	3
6	9	MF	(Chinese Taipei)	Lin Yu-syuan	2	0	2
7	4	DF	(Chinese Taipei)	Lai Wei-ju	1	0	1
7	7	FW	(Chinese Taipei)	Tang Yung-ching	1	0	1
7	12	DF	(Chinese Taipei)	Wu Yu	1	0	1
7	23	MF	(Chinese Taipei)	Liu Chien-yun	1	0	1
Own goals (from the opponents)					1	0	1
Totals					63	5	68

=== Hat-tricks ===
Player	Against	Result	Date	Competition	Ref
(Chinese Taipei) Lee Hsiu-chin	Taipei Bravo	3–2	13 April 2019	Taiwan Mulan Football League	
(Chinese Taipei) Su Yu-hsuan	Inter Taipei	9–1	11 May 2019	Taiwan Mulan Football League	
(Chinese Taipei) Lee Hsiu-chin	Kaohsiung Sunny Bank	7–1	31 August 2019	Taiwan Mulan Football League	
(Chinese Taipei) Pao Hsin-hsuan	Inter Taipei	6–0	14 September 2019	Taiwan Mulan Football League	

=== Cleansheets ===
Rank	No.	Nat.	Player	TMFL	Finals	Total
1	1	(Chinese Taipei)	Tsai Ming-jung	4	–	4
1	18	(Chinese Taipei)	Cheng Ssu-yu	3	1	4
3	1	(Chinese Taipei)	Chen Miao-wen	0	–	0
Totals				7	1	8

== Awards ==
Player	Position	Award	Ref.
(Chinese Taipei) Lee Hsiu-chin	Forward	Golden Boot	
(Chinese Taipei) Lu Kuei-hua	Head coach	Coach of the Year	
