= 2023 Taichung Blue Whale season =

Taichung Blue Whale
2023 season
- Head coach: Lu Kuei-hua
- Stadium: Taiyuan Football Field; Fu Jen Catholic University (1 game); Ming Chuan University (1 game)
- TMFL: 1st
- Top goalscorer: League: Maho Tanaka (4); All: Maho Tanaka (4)
- Highest home attendance: 208 vs Kaohsiung Sunny Bank (4 November 2023)
- Lowest home attendance: 49 vs New Taipei Hang Yuen (18 November 2023)
- Average home league attendance: 96
- Biggest win: Kaohsiung Sunny Bank 0–3 Taichung Blue Whale
- Biggest defeat: Taichung Blue Whale 0–1 New Taipei Hang Yuen

The 2023 Taichung Blue Whale season was the club's 10th season and their 10th season in Taiwan Mulan Football League. Marking the club's 10th anniversary, the game jersey featured a golden 10th anniversary commemorative logo for all games in the season.

On 9 December 2023, Taichung Blue Whale mathematically won their 5th Taiwan Mulan Football League title with one game remaining.

== Kits ==
- Supplier: MIE Jersey
- Main Sponsor: Skechers

== Management team ==
Position	Name
Head coach	(Chinese Taipei) Lu Kuei-hua
Assistant coaches	(Chinese Taipei) Cheng Ya-hsun, (Chinese Taipei) Li Yan-ting
Fitness coach	(Chinese Taipei) Chiu Yu-fang
Goalkeeping coach	(Chinese Taipei) Chang Po-hsiang
Medical	(Chinese Taipei) Chen Ching-teng

- Last updated: 22 March 2024

== Players ==
N	Pos.	Nat.	Name	Age.	Since
Goalkeepers
1	GK	(Chinese Taipei)	Tsai Ming-jung (captain)	34	2022
25	GK	(Chinese Taipei)	Shih Yung-chen		2023
26	GK	(Chinese Taipei)	Cho Yun-Chen	20	2022
Defenders
3	DF	(Chinese Taipei)	Shen Yen-chun	24	2020
4	DF	(Thailand)	Phornphirun Philawan	24	2023
7	DF	(Chinese Taipei)	Pan Shin-yu	26	2020
8	DF	(Chinese Taipei)	Wang Shu-wen	22	2018
12	DF	(Chinese Taipei)	Wu Yu	25	2018
17	DF	(Chinese Taipei)	Sung Yu-ting	20	2023
21	DF	(Chinese Taipei)	Chen Tzu-chen	25	2023
22	DF	(Chinese Taipei)	Li Pei-jung	23	2022
Midfielders
2	MF	(Chinese Taipei)	Chang Chi-lan	27	2014
6	MF	(Thailand)	Silawan Intamee	29	2022
14	MF	(Japan)	Maho Tanaka	22	2019
16	MF	(Chinese Taipei)	Chen Jin-wen	20	2022
19	MF	(Thailand)	Pitsamai Sornsai	34	2021
23	MF	(Chinese Taipei)	Liu Chien-yun	31	2014
24	MF	(Chinese Taipei)	Lin Yu-syuan	20	2022
30	MF	(Chinese Taipei)	Wu Ya-yu	16	2023
Forwards
9	FW	(Chinese Taipei)	Nien Ching-yun	21	2020
11	FW	(Chinese Taipei)	Lai Li-chin	35	2023
13	FW	(Thailand)	Saowalak Peng-ngam	27	2023
15	FW	(Chinese Taipei)	Chang Yu-chiao		2023
18	FW	(Chinese Taipei)	Chiang Tzu-shan	20	2022
20	FW	(Chinese Taipei)	Chien Hsuan-ying	18	2021
27	FW	(Chinese Taipei)	Li Yong-shan		2023

- Ordered by squad number.

== Transfers ==
=== In ===
No.	Pos.	Player	Transferred from	Source
Preseason
15	FW	Chang Yu-chiao	(Chinese Taipei) NTUS Blue Whale	
17	DF	Sung Yu-ting	(Chinese Taipei) Kaohsiung Sunny Bank	
21	DF	Chen Tzu-chen	(Chinese Taipei) NTUS Blue Whale	
Midseason
4	DF	Phornphirun Philawan	(Thailand) College of Asian Scholars	
11	FW	Lai Li-chin	—	
13	FW	Saowalak Peng-ngam	(Thailand) Chonburi	
25	GK	Shih Yung-chen	(Chinese Taipei) NTUS Blue Whale	
27	FW	Li Yong-shan	(Chinese Taipei) Hui Wen High School	
30	MF	Wu Ya-yu	(Chinese Taipei) NTUS Blue Whale	

=== Out ===
No.	Pos.	Player	Transferred to	Source
Preseason
4	DF	Lai Wei-ju	—	
10	FW	Su Yu-hsuan	(China) Hainan Qiongzhong	
11	FW	Lai Li-chin	—	
13	DF	Chang Wei-chen	—	
15	DF	Iori Hidaka	—	
16	MF	Hou Fang-wei	—	
17	MF	Lee Yi-hsun	—	
Midseason
25	GK	Nattaruja Muthtanawech	—	

== Competitions ==
=== Overall record ===
Competition	First match	Last match	Starting round	Final position	Record							
Competition	First match	Last match	Starting round	Final position	Pld	W	D	L	GF	GA	GD	Win %
Taiwan Mulan Football League	22 April 2023	16 December 2023	Matchday 1	Winners	15	10	4	1	21	8	+13	66.67
Total					15	10	4	1	21	8	+13	66.67

=== Taiwan Mulan Football League ===
==== League table ====
Pos	Team	Pld	W	D	L	GF	GA	GD	Pts	Qualification or relegation
1	Taichung Blue Whale (C)	15	10	4	1	21	8	+13	34	Qualification for the AFC Women's Champions League
2	New Taipei Hang Yuen	15	8	4	3	24	12	+12	28	
3	Kaohsiung Sunny Bank	15	6	4	5	15	12	+3	22	
4	Taipei Bravo PlayOne	15	4	5	6	10	14	−4	17	
5	Hualien	15	5	2	8	12	19	−7	17	Transfer to 2024 Taiwan Mulan Football League qualifiers
6	Mars	15	2	1	12	10	27	−17	7	Transfer to 2024 Taiwan Mulan Football League qualifiers

(C) Champions

==== Results by round ====
Round	1	2	3	4	5	6	7	8	9	10	11	12	13	14	15
Ground	A	H	H	H	A	H	H	H	A	H	A	H	H	H	A
Result	W	L	W	D	D	D	W	W	W	W	W	D	W	W	W
Position	1	3	1	1	3	3	1	1	1	1	1	1	1	1	1

A = Away; H = Home; W = Win; D = Draw; L = Loss

==== Matches ====
22 April 2023 1	Hualien	0–1	Taichung Blue Whale	Hualien
16:00 (UTC+8)		Report	Nien Ching-yun 26'	Stadium: Mei Lun Junior High School; Attendance: 120; Referee: Lee Yi-chi

29 April 2023 2	Taichung Blue Whale	0–1	New Taipei Hang Yuen	New Taipei
16:00 (UTC+8)		Report	Lee Yi-wen 26'	Stadium: Fu Jen Catholic University; Attendance: 83; Referee: Lin Ching-tang

6 May 2023 3	Taichung Blue Whale	2–1	Taoyuan Mars	Taichung
16:00 (UTC+8)	Sornsai 13'; Intamee 90+2'	Report	Kao Hsin 42'; Hsu Yi-yun (yellow card) 76'	Stadium: Taiyuan Football Field; Attendance: 131; Referee: Wang Chieh

13 May 2023 4	Taichung Blue Whale	1–1	Taipei Bravo PlayOne	Taichung
16:00 (UTC+8)	Intamee 88'	Report	Wang Yi-ting 45+3'	Stadium: Taiyuan Football Field; Attendance: 96; Referee: Yang Chang-pei

20 May 2023 5	Kaohsiung Sunny Bank	1–1	Taichung Blue Whale	Kaohsiung
16:00 (UTC+8)	Lin Yu-syuan (yellow card) 38'; Intamee 41'; Sung Yu-ting (yellow card) 90+2'	Report	Chan Pi-han 90+5'	Stadium: Kaohsiung Nanzih Football Stadium; Attendance: 389; Referee: Huang Chien-jung

27 May 2023 6	Taichung Blue Whale	0–0	Hualien	Taichung
16:00 (UTC+8)		Report	Chen Ying-hui (yellow card) 19'; Zhuo Li-ping (yellow card) 30'	Stadium: Taiyuan Football Field; Attendance: 115; Referee: Wang Chieh

18 June 2023 7	Taichung Blue Whale	2–1	New Taipei Hang Yuen	Taichung
16:00 (UTC+8)	Liu Chien-yun 47'; Sornsai 61'	Report	Tseng Shu-o 41'	Stadium: Taiyuan Football Field; Attendance: 56; Referee: Yang Chang-pei

1 July 2023 8	Taichung Blue Whale	3–1	Taoyuan Mars	Taichung
16:00 (UTC+8)	Pan Shin-yu 15'; Tanaka 38'; Liu Chien-yun 52'	Report	Yang Hsiao-chuan 7'	Stadium: Taiyuan Football Field; Attendance: 63; Referee: Yang Shu-ting

8 July 2023 9	Taipei Bravo PlayOne	0–2	Taichung Blue Whale	Taoyuan
16:00 (UTC+8)		Report	Chang Yu-chiao 20'; Tanaka 86'	Stadium: Qingpu Football Field; Attendance: 28; Referee: Chiu Po-yueh

4 November 2023 10	Taichung Blue Whale	1–0	Kaohsiung Sunny Bank	Taichung
16:00 (UTC+8)	Liu Chien-yun 29'	Report	Lu Meng-fang (yellow card) 75'	Stadium: Taiyuan Football Field; Attendance: 208; Referee: Lin Chien

18 November 2023 12	Taichung Blue Whale	1–1	New Taipei Hang Yuen	Taoyuan
15:00 (UTC+8)	Tanaka 17'; Sornsai (yellow card) 58'	Report	Lee Yi-wen 74'	Stadium: Ming Chuan University; Attendance: 49; Referee: Lee Tsung-ying

25 November 2023 13	Taichung Blue Whale	1–0	Mars	Taichung
15:00 (UTC+8)	Peng-ngam 72'	Report		Stadium: Taiyuan Football Field; Attendance: 73; Referee: Yang Chang-pei

2 December 2023 11	Hualien	1–2	Taichung Blue Whale	Hualien
15:00 (UTC+8)	Yang Hsuan 40'	Report	Peng-ngam 34'; Philawan 63'	Stadium: Mei Lun Junior High School; Attendance: 85; Referee: Lin Chien

9 December 2023 14	Taichung Blue Whale	1–0	Taipei Bravo PlayOne	Taichung
15:00 (UTC+8)	Lai Li-chin 84'	Report		Stadium: Taiyuan Football Field; Attendance: 84; Referee: Hsu Min-yu

16 December 2023 15	Kaohsiung Sunny Bank	0–3	Taichung Blue Whale	Kaohsiung
15:00 (UTC+8)	Wu Kai-ching (yellow card) 19'	Report	Tanaka 17'; Peng-ngam 23'; Chiang Tzu-shan 32'	Stadium: Kaohsiung Nanzih Football Stadium; Attendance: 208; Referee: Kuo Chia-hao

== Statistics ==
=== Squad statistics ===
No.	Pos	Nat	Player	Total		TMFL	
No.	Pos	Nat	Player	Apps	Goals	Apps	Goals
Goalkeepers
1	GK	(Chinese Taipei) TPE	Tsai Ming-jung	14	0	14	0
25	GK	(Chinese Taipei) TPE	Shih Yung-chen	0	0	0	0
26	GK	(Chinese Taipei) TPE	Cho Yun-chen	2	0	1+1	0
Defenders
3	DF	(Chinese Taipei) TPE	Shen Yen-chun	10	0	6+4	0
4	DF	(Thailand) THA	Phornphirun Philawan	6	1	6	1
7	DF	(Chinese Taipei) TPE	Pan Shin-yu	10	1	8+2	1
8	DF	(Chinese Taipei) TPE	Wang Shu-wen	11	0	11	0
12	DF	(Chinese Taipei) TPE	Wu Yu	9	0	2+7	0
17	DF	(Chinese Taipei) TPE	Sung Yu-ting	10	0	8+2	0
21	DF	(Chinese Taipei) TPE	Chen Tzu-chen	12	0	11+1	0
22	DF	(Chinese Taipei) TPE	Li Pei-jung	9	0	9	0
Midfielders
2	MF	(Chinese Taipei) TPE	Chang Chi-lan	10	0	5+5	0
6	MF	(Thailand) THA	Silawan Intamee	15	3	14+1	3
14	MF	(Japan) JPN	Maho Tanaka	9	4	7+2	4
16	MF	(Chinese Taipei) TPE	Chen Jin-wen	10	0	1+9	0
19	MF	(Thailand) THA	Pitsamai Sornsai	15	2	15	2
23	MF	(Chinese Taipei) TPE	Liu Chien-yun	12	3	12	3
24	MF	(Chinese Taipei) TPE	Lin Yu-syuan	13	0	3+10	0
30	MF	(Chinese Taipei) TPE	Wu Ya-yu	1	0	0+1	0
Forwards
9	FW	(Chinese Taipei) TPE	Nien Ching-yun	12	1	7+5	1
11	FW	(Chinese Taipei) TPE	Lai Li-chin	4	1	4	1
13	FW	(Thailand) THA	Saowalak Peng-ngam	6	3	6	3
15	FW	(Chinese Taipei) TPE	Chang Yu-chiao	8	1	5+3	1
18	FW	(Chinese Taipei) TPE	Chiang Tzu-shan	12	1	10+2	1
20	FW	(Chinese Taipei) TPE	Chien Hsuan-ying	5	0	0+5	0
27	FW	(Chinese Taipei) TPE	Li Yong-shan	0	0	0	0
Own goals (0)

=== Goalscorers ===
Rank	No.	Pos.	Nat.	Player	TMFL	Total
1	14	MF	(Japan)	Maho Tanaka	4	4
2	6	MF	(Thailand)	Silawan Intamee	3	3
2	13	FW	(Thailand)	Saowalak Peng-ngam	3	3
2	23	MF	(Chinese Taipei)	Liu Chien-yun	3	3
5	19	MF	(Thailand)	Pitsamai Sornsai	2	2
6	4	DF	(Thailand)	Phornphirun Philawan	1	1
6	7	DF	(Chinese Taipei)	Pan Shin-yu	1	1
6	9	FW	(Chinese Taipei)	Nien Ching-yun	1	1
6	11	FW	(Chinese Taipei)	Lai Li-chin	1	1
6	15	FW	(Chinese Taipei)	Chang Yu-chiao	1	1
6	18	FW	(Chinese Taipei)	Chiang Tzu-shan	1	1
Own goals (from the opponents)					0	0
Totals					21	21

=== Cleansheets ===
Rank	No.	Nat.	Player	TMFL	Total
1	1	(Chinese Taipei)	Tsai Ming-jung	6	6
2	26	(Chinese Taipei)	Cho Yun-chen	1	1
3	25	(Thailand)	Nattaruja Muthtanawech	—	0
3	25	(Chinese Taipei)	Shih Yung-chen	—	0
Totals				7	7

=== Disciplinary record ===
No.	Pos.	Nat.	Name	TMFL			Total		
No.	Pos.	Nat.	Name	Booked	(yellow card) (yellow-red card)	Sent off (straight red)	Booked	(yellow card) (yellow-red card)	Sent off (straight red)
17	DF	(Chinese Taipei)	Sung Yu-ting	1			1		
19	MF	(Thailand)	Pitsamai Sornsai	1			1		
24	MF	(Chinese Taipei)	Lin Yu-syuan	1			1		
Totals				3			3		

Ordered by (red card) , (second yellow card) and (yellow card)
(yellow card) = Number of bookings; (second yellow card) = Number of sending offs after a second yellow card; (red card) = Number of sending offs by a direct red card.

== Awards ==
Player	Position	Award	Ref.
(Chinese Taipei) Liu Chien-yun	Midfielder	Most Valuable Player	
(Chinese Taipei) Lu Kuei-hua	Head Coach	Best Coach	
(Chinese Taipei) Tsai Ming-jung	Goalkeeper	Golden Gloves	
