= 2017 Taichung Blue Whale season =

Taichung Blue Whale
2017 season
- Head coach: Hiroyuki Horino
- Stadium: Fengyuan Stadium
- TMFL: Winners
- Top goalscorer: League: Lee Hsiu-chin (9); All: Lee Hsiu-chin (10)
- Biggest win: Kaohsiung Sunny Bank 1–8 Taichung Blue Whale
- Biggest defeat: Taichung Blue Whale 1–2 Taipei PlayOne

The 2017 Taichung Blue Whale season was the club's 4th season and their 4th season in Taiwan Mulan Football League.

== Kits ==
- Supplier: Adidas
- Main Sponsor: YE Sports

== Management team ==
Position	Name
Head coach	(Japan) Hiroyuki Horino
Assistant coaches	(Chinese Taipei) Chuang Shu-mei, (Chinese Taipei) Lu Kuei-hua
Goalkeeping coach	(Chinese Taipei) Liu Shih-hua
Athletic trainer	(Chinese Taipei) Yu Wan-ching

- Last updated: 1 July 2024

== Players ==
N	Pos.	Nat.	Name	Age.	Since
Goalkeepers
1	GK	(Chinese Taipei)	Cheng Ssu-yu	28	2014
18	GK	(Chinese Taipei)	Wang Yu-ting	16	2017
Defenders
4	DF	(Chinese Taipei)	Lai Wei-ju	23	2014
5	DF	(Chinese Taipei)	Lai Yi-ju		2017
6	DF	(Chinese Taipei)	Chang Wei-chen	28	2016
12	DF	(Chinese Taipei)	Hsu Chih-ting		2014
13	DF	(Chinese Taipei)	Tseng Wen-ting	21	2015
15	DF	(Chinese Taipei)	Cheng Ya-hsun		2014
22	DF	(Chinese Taipei)	Yu Shu-fang	22	2016
Midfielders
2	MF	(Chinese Taipei)	Chang Chi-lan	21	2014
8	MF	(Chinese Taipei)	Yang Ssu-wei	21	2014
9	MF	(Chinese Taipei)	Tsou Hsin-ni	22	2014
14	MF	(Chinese Taipei)	Yang Chia-hui	20	2017
16	MF	(Chinese Taipei)	Hou Fang-wei	25	2014
19	MF	(Chinese Taipei)	Chuang Shu-mei		2017
20	MF	(Chinese Taipei)	Tuan Yu-jou	21	2015
23	MF	(Chinese Taipei)	Liu Chien-yun	25	2014
Forwards
3	FW	(Chinese Taipei)	Su Yu-hsuan	16	2016
7	FW	(Chinese Taipei)	Tang Yung-ching	22	2014
10	FW	(Chinese Taipei)	Lee Hsiu-chin	25	2014
11	FW	(Chinese Taipei)	Lai Li-chin (captain)	29	2015
17	FW	(Chinese Taipei)	Ho Hsuan-yi	21	2016
21	FW	(Chinese Taipei)	Chen Hsiu-wen		2017

- Ordered by squad number.

== Transfers ==
=== In ===
No.	Pos.	Player	Transferred from	Source
Preseason
5	MF	Hsieh Cheng-ya	—	
14	MF	Ho Chia-chen	—	
18	GK	Wang Yu-ting	—	
21	FW	Chen Hsiu-wen	—	
Midseason
5	DF	Lai Yi-ju	—	
14	MF	Yang Chia-hui	—	
19	MF	Chuang Shu-mei	—	

=== Out ===
No.	Pos.	Player	Transferred to	Source
Preseason
5	MF	Chan Pi-han	(Chinese Taipei) Taipei PlayOne	
14	MF	Yang Chia-hui	—	
18	GK	Cheng Ya-wen	—	
21	GK	Hsu Miao-hua	—	
Midseason
5	MF	Hsieh Cheng-ya	—	
14	MF	Ho Chia-chen	—	
19	MF	Kao Pei-ling	—	

== Competitions ==
=== Overall record ===
Competition	First match	Last match	Starting round	Final position	Record							
Competition	First match	Last match	Starting round	Final position	Pld	W	D	L	GF	GA	GD	Win %
Taiwan Mulan Football League	23 April 2017	26 November 2017	Matchday 1	Winners	17	12	4	1	41	10	+31	70.59
Total					17	12	4	1	41	10	+31	70.59

=== Taiwan Mulan Football League ===
==== League table ====
Pos	Team	Pld	W	D	L	GF	GA	GD	Pts	Qualification or relegation
1	Taipei PlayOne (Q)	15	12	1	2	40	18	+22	37	Qualification for the Mulan League Finals
2	Taichung Blue Whale (Q)	15	10	4	1	38	10	+28	34	Qualification for the Mulan League Finals
3	Hualien	15	8	4	3	44	15	+29	28	
4	Hsinchu	15	7	1	7	37	20	+17	22	
5	Kaohsiung Sunny Bank	15	3	0	12	23	62	−39	9	
6	New Taipei Hang Yuen	15	0	0	15	9	66	−57	0	

(Q) Qualified for the phase indicated

==== Results by round ====
Round	1	2	3	4	5	6	7	8	9	10	11	12	13	14	15
Result	W	W	W	D	W	W	W	D	L	W	W	W	W	D	D
Position	1	3	1	2	2	2	2	2	2	2	2	2	2	2	2

W = Win; D = Draw; L = Loss

==== Matches ====
23 April 2017 1	Taichung Blue Whale	4–0	Kaohsiung Sunny Bank	Taichung
18:00 (UTC+8)	Lai Li-chin 21', 52'; Kao Pei-ling 66'; Liu Chien-yun 68'	Recap		Stadium: Fengyuan Stadium

30 April 2017 2	Taichung Blue Whale	2–1	Hsinchu	Kaohsiung
18:00 (UTC+8)	Yang Ssu-wei 18'; Lai Li-chin 48'	Recap	Lin Tsu-hui 66'	Stadium: National Stadium; Referee: Chien Meng-en

7 May 2017 3	New Taipei Hang Yuen	1–4	Taichung Blue Whale	Hualien
14:00 (UTC+8)	Kao Yen-han 81'	Recap	Tsou Hsin-ni 23'; Lai Li-chin 45+1'; Lai Wei-ju 60'; Lee Hsiu-chin 82'	Stadium: Hualien Stadium; Referee: Lee Yu-wei

27 May 2017 4	Hualien	0–0	Taichung Blue Whale	Kaohsiung
16:00 (UTC+8)		Recap		Stadium: National Stadium; Referee: Lee Yu-wei

17 June 2017 7	New Taipei Hang Yuen	1–3	Taichung Blue Whale	Taipei
14:00 (UTC+8)	Chen Hsin-jou 34'	Recap	Ho Hsuan-yi 5'; Yang Ssu-wei 25'; Tseng Wen-ting 56'	Stadium: Yingfeng Riverside Park

24 June 2017 8	Taichung Blue Whale	1–1	Hualien	Taichung
18:00 (UTC+8)	Lai Wei-ju 47'	Recap	Chen Ya-hui 60'	Stadium: Fengyuan Stadium

1 July 2017 9	Taichung Blue Whale	1–2	Taipei PlayOne	Hsinchu County
13:00 (UTC+8)	Tsou Hsin-ni 85'	Recap	Lin Yi-ying 27'; Lin Ya-han 58' (pen.)	Stadium: Hsinchu County Second Stadium

2 September 2017 10	Taichung Blue Whale	2–1	Taipei PlayOne	Hsinchu County
14:00 (UTC+8)	Lai Li-chin 26'; Lee Hsiu-chin 54'	Recap	Lin Ya-han 27'	Stadium: Hsinchu County Second Stadium

10 September 2017 11	Taichung Blue Whale	4–0	Kaohsiung Sunny Bank	Taichung
18:00 (UTC+8)	Lee Hsiu-chin 10', 24'; Lai Li-chin 20'; Chang Chi-lan 47'	Recap		Stadium: Fengyuan Stadium

17 September 2017 12	Taichung Blue Whale	2–0	Hsinchu	Kaohsiung
16:00 (UTC+8)	Chang Wei-chen 54'; Lee Hsiu-chin 85' (pen.)	Recap		Stadium: National Stadium

24 September 2017 13	New Taipei Hang Yuen	0–4	Taichung Blue Whale	New Taipei
14:00 (UTC+8)		Recap	Lee Hsiu-chin 12'; Ho Hsuan-yi 38'; Lai Li-chin 58'; Su Yu-hsuan 75'	Stadium: Fu Jen Catholic University

1 October 2017 14	Hualien	1–1	Taichung Blue Whale	Hsinchu County
10:00 (UTC+8)	Tan Wen-lin 22'	Recap	Tang Yung-ching 69'	Stadium: Hsinchu County Second Stadium

14 October 2017 5	Kaohsiung Sunny Bank	1–8	Taichung Blue Whale	Taichung
18:00 (UTC+8)	Yang Mei-chuan 85'	Recap	Yang Ssu-wei 4', 47'; Lee Hsiu-chin 20', 45'; Chang Chi-lan 54'; Su Yu-hsuan 68'; Hou Fang-wei 74'; Tseng Wen-ting 88'	Stadium: Fengyuan Stadium

4 November 2017 6	Taichung Blue Whale	1–0	Hsinchu	Taichung
15:00 (UTC+8)	Lai Li-chin 72'	Recap		Stadium: Taiyuan Football Field

11 November 2017 15	Taichung Blue Whale	1–1	Taipei PlayOne	Hualien
14:00 (UTC+8)	Lee Hsiu-chin 21'	Recap	Chen Ya-chun 13'	Stadium: Hualien Stadium

==== Mulan League Finals ====
18 November 2017 1st leg	Taichung Blue Whale	1–0	Taipei PlayOne	Kaohsiung
14:30 (UTC+8)	Tuan Yu-jou 30'	Recap		Stadium: National Stadium

26 November 2017 2nd leg	Taipei PlayOne	0–2	Taichung Blue Whale	Taipei
17:00 (UTC+8)		Recap	Lai Li-chin 84'; Lee Hsiu-chin 90+4'	Stadium: Taipei Municipal Stadium; Referee: Kuo Chia-hao

== Statistics ==
=== Goalscorers ===
Rank	No.	Pos.	Nat.	Player	TMFL	Finals	Total
1	10	FW	(Chinese Taipei)	Lee Hsiu-chin	9	1	10
2	11	FW	(Chinese Taipei)	Lai Li-chin	8	1	9
3	8	MF	(Chinese Taipei)	Yang Ssu-wei	4	0	4
4	2	MF	(Chinese Taipei)	Chang Chi-lan	2	0	2
4	3	FW	(Chinese Taipei)	Su Yu-hsuan	2	0	2
4	4	DF	(Chinese Taipei)	Lai Wei-ju	2	0	2
4	9	MF	(Chinese Taipei)	Tsou Hsin-ni	2	0	2
4	13	DF	(Chinese Taipei)	Tseng Wen-ting	2	0	2
4	17	FW	(Chinese Taipei)	Ho Hsuan-yi	2	0	2
10	6	DF	(Chinese Taipei)	Chang Wei-chen	1	0	1
10	7	FW	(Chinese Taipei)	Tang Yung-ching	1	0	1
10	16	MF	(Chinese Taipei)	Hou Fang-wei	1	0	1
10	19	MF	(Chinese Taipei)	Kao Pei-ling	1	0	1
10	23	MF	(Chinese Taipei)	Liu Chien-yun	1	0	1
10	20	MF	(Chinese Taipei)	Tuan Yu-jou	0	1	1
Own goals (from the opponents)					0	0	0
Totals					38	3	41

== Awards ==
Player	Position	Award	Ref.
(Chinese Taipei) Cheng Ssu-yu	Goalkeeper	Golden Glove	
(Chinese Taipei) Hiroyuki Horino	Head coach	Coach of the Year	
