= 2016 Taichung Blue Whale season =

Taichung Blue Whale
2016 season
- Head coach: Lu Kuei-hua
- Stadium: Fengyuan Stadium
- TMFL: 3rd
- Top goalscorer: League: Lai Li-chin (6); All: Lai Li-chin (6)
- Biggest win: Taichung Blue Whale 3–0 Kaohsiung Sunny Bank
- Biggest defeat: Taichung Blue Whale 2–4 Hualien TLDC

The 2016 Taichung Blue Whale season was the club's 3rd season and their 3rd season in Taiwan Mulan Football League.

== Kits ==
- Supplier: Adidas
- Main Sponsor: YE Sports

== Management team ==
Position	Name
Head coach	(Chinese Taipei) Lu Kuei-hua
Assistant coach	(Chinese Taipei) Chuang Shu-mei
Goalkeeping coach	(Chinese Taipei) Liu Shih-hua
Athletic trainer	(Chinese Taipei) Yu Wan-ching

- Last updated: 2 July 2024

== Players ==
N	Pos.	Nat.	Name	Age.	Since
Goalkeepers
1	GK	(Chinese Taipei)	Cheng Ssu-yu	27	2014
18	GK	(Chinese Taipei)	Cheng Ya-wen	15	2016
21	GK	(Chinese Taipei)	Hsu Miao-hua	15	2016
Defenders
4	DF	(Chinese Taipei)	Lai Wei-ju	22	2014
6	DF	(Chinese Taipei)	Chang Wei-chen	27	2016
12	DF	(Chinese Taipei)	Hsu Chih-ting		2014
13	DF	(Chinese Taipei)	Tseng Wen-ting	20	2015
15	DF	(Chinese Taipei)	Cheng Ya-hsun		2014
22	DF	(Chinese Taipei)	Yu Shu-fang	21	2016
Midfielders
2	MF	(Chinese Taipei)	Chang Chi-lan	20	2014
5	MF	(Chinese Taipei)	Chan Pi-han	24	2015
8	MF	(Chinese Taipei)	Yang Ssu-wei	20	2014
9	MF	(Chinese Taipei)	Tsou Hsin-ni	21	2014
14	MF	(Chinese Taipei)	Yang Chia-hui	19	2016
16	MF	(Chinese Taipei)	Hou Fang-wei	24	2014
19	MF	(Chinese Taipei)	Kao Pei-ling	19	2016
20	MF	(Chinese Taipei)	Tuan Yu-jou	20	2015
23	MF	(Chinese Taipei)	Liu Chien-yun	24	2014
Forwards
3	FW	(Chinese Taipei)	Su Yu-hsuan	15	2016
7	FW	(Chinese Taipei)	Tang Yung-ching	21	2014
10	FW	(Chinese Taipei)	Lee Hsiu-chin	24	2014
11	FW	(Chinese Taipei)	Lai Li-chin (captain)	28	2015
17	FW	(Chinese Taipei)	Ho Hsuan-yi	20	2016

- Ordered by squad number.

== Transfers ==
=== In ===
No.	Pos.	Player	Transferred from	Source
Preseason
3	FW	Su Yu-hsuan	—	
6	DF	Chang Wei-chen	(Chinese Taipei) Hsinchu	
14	MF	Yang Chia-hui	—	
17	FW	Ho Hsuan-yi	(Chinese Taipei) Hsinchu	
18	GK	Cheng Ya-wen	—	
19	MF	Kao Pei-ling	(Chinese Taipei) Hsinchu	
21	GK	Hsu Miao-hua	—	
22	DF	Yu Shu-fang	(Japan) lecre MYFC	

=== Out ===
No.	Pos.	Player	Transferred to	Source
Preseason
3	DF	Yeh Hui-ju	—	
6	DF	Chen Ying-hui	—	
14	MF	Lin Yun	—	
17	DF	Lin Chiung-ying	—	
18	GK	Chiu Yu-ting	—	
19	DF	Hsu Tzu-chiao	—	
21	GK	Yang Chen-yen	—	
22	MF	Ho Han-hsuan	—	

== Preseason and friendlies ==
7 August 2016 Friendly	Taichung Blue Whale (Chinese Taipei)	2–0	(Japan) Smile Seleção U18	Chiayi County
17:00 (UTC+8)				Stadium: WuFeng University

== Competitions ==
=== Overall record ===
Competition	First match	Last match	Starting round	Final position	Record							
Competition	First match	Last match	Starting round	Final position	Pld	W	D	L	GF	GA	GD	Win %
Taiwan Mulan Football League	17 April 2016	1 October 2016	Matchday 1	Third place	12	5	4	3	18	13	+5	41.67
Total					12	5	4	3	18	13	+5	41.67

=== Taiwan Mulan Football League ===
==== League table ====
Pos	Team	Pld	W	D	L	GF	GA	GD	Pts
1	Hualien TLDC (C)	12	8	3	1	25	11	+14	27
2	Hsinchu	12	6	2	4	18	16	+2	20
3	Taichung Blue Whale	12	5	4	3	18	13	+5	19
4	Taipei SCSC	12	4	2	6	14	16	−2	14
5	Kaohsiung Sunny Bank	12	1	1	10	6	25	−19	4

(C) Champions

==== Results by round ====
Round	1	2	3	4	5	6	7	8	9	10	11	12	13	14	15
Result	L	L	D	D			W	L	D	W	D		W	W	W
Position	4	5	5	5	5	5	4	4	4	4	4	4	4	3	3

W = Win; D = Draw; L = Loss

==== Matches ====
17 April 2016 1	Taichung Blue Whale	1–2	Hualien TLDC	Kaohsiung
15:00 (UTC+8)	Chan Pi-han 21'	Highlights	Su Hsin-yun 25', 36'	Stadium: National Stadium; Referee: Kuo Chan-yu

24 April 2016 2	Hsinchu	2–1	Taichung Blue Whale	Hsinchu County
15:30 (UTC+8)	Yang Ya-han 5', 81'	Highlights	Tsou Hsin-ni 21'	Stadium: Hsinchu County Stadium; Referee: Lee Tsung-ying

30 April 2016 3	Taichung Blue Whale	1–1	Taipei SCSC	Taichung
17:30 (UTC+8)	Ho Hsuan-yi 83'	Highlights	Chen Yi-ping 59'	Stadium: Fengyuan Stadium; Referee: Lee Yi-chi

7 May 2016 4	Hsinchu	0–0	Taichung Blue Whale	Taipei
13:00 (UTC+8)		Highlights		Stadium: Bailing Sport Park; Referee: Kuo Chia-hao

11 June 2016 7	Taipei SCSC	1–3	Taichung Blue Whale	New Taipei
16:30 (UTC+8)	Wei Tsai-ping 90+2'	Highlights	Ho Hsuan-yi 14', 19'; Tsou Hsin-ni 69'	Stadium: Fu Jen Catholic University; Referee: Lee Tsung-ying

18 June 2016 8	Taichung Blue Whale	2–4	Hualien TLDC	Taichung
17:30 (UTC+8)	Chan Pi-han 47'; Tsou Hsin-ni 50'	Highlights	Yu Hsiu-chin 15'; Zhuo Li-ping 70'; Chen Ying-hui 89'; Lin Hsiao-yun 90'	Stadium: Fengyuan Stadium; Referee: Hung Po-kai

25 June 2016 9	Kaohsiung Sunny Bank	0–0	Taichung Blue Whale	Hualien
14:00 (UTC+8)		Highlights		Stadium: Hualien Stadium; Referee: Kao Jung-fang

2 July 2016 10	Kaohsiung Sunny Bank	1–3	Taichung Blue Whale	Kaohsiung
17:30 (UTC+8)	Ko Li-nien 54'	Highlights	Lai Li-chin 8', 44', 75'	Stadium: National Stadium; Referee: Kuo Chan-yu

27 August 2016 11	Taichung Blue Whale	0–0	Hualien TLDC	Kaohsiung
17:30 (UTC+8)		Highlights		Stadium: National Stadium; Referee: Chang Chih-chuan

10 September 2016 13	Taichung Blue Whale	2–1	Hsinchu	Hualien
14:00 (UTC+8)	Ho Hsuan-yi 53'; Lai Li-chin 65'	Highlights	Chen Yen-ping 61'	Stadium: Hualien Stadium; Referee: Chen Liang-chen

24 September 2016 14	Taipei SCSC	1–2	Taichung Blue Whale	Taipei
16:30 (UTC+8)	Pan Yen-hsin 7'	Highlights	Tuan Yu-jou 17'; Lai Li-chin 56' (pen.)	Stadium: Bailing Sports Park; Referee: Yu Ming-hsun

1 October 2016 15	Taichung Blue Whale	3–0	Kaohsiung Sunny Bank	Taichung
17:30 (UTC+8)	Chan Pi-han 32'; Lai Li-chin 55'; Lee Hsiu-chin 87'			Stadium: Fengyuan Stadium

== Statistics ==
=== Goalscorers ===
Rank	No.	Pos.	Nat.	Player	TMFL	Total
1	11	FW	(Chinese Taipei)	Lai Li-chin	6	6
2	17	FW	(Chinese Taipei)	Ho Hsuan-yi	4	4
3	5	MF	(Chinese Taipei)	Chan Pi-han	3	3
3	9	MF	(Chinese Taipei)	Tsou Hsin-ni	3	3
5	10	FW	(Chinese Taipei)	Lee Hsiu-chin	1	1
5	20	MF	(Chinese Taipei)	Tuan Yu-jou	1	1
Own goals (from the opponents)					0	0
Totals					18	18

=== Hat-tricks ===
Player	Against	Result	Date	Competition	Ref
(Chinese Taipei) Lai Li-chin	Kaohsiung Sunny Bank	3–1	2 July 2016	Taiwan Mulan Football League	
