= 2021 Taichung Blue Whale season =

Taichung Blue Whale
2021 season
- Head coach: Lu Kuei-hua
- Stadium: Taiyuan Football Field
- TMFL: 1st
- Top goalscorer: League: Lai Li-chin (5); Maho Tanaka (5); All: Lai Li-chin (5); Maho Tanaka (5)
- Biggest win: Taichung Blue Whale 4–0 Taipei Bravo; Inter Taoyuan 0–4 Taichung Blue Whale; Taichung Blue Whale 4–0 Inter Taoyuan
- Biggest defeat: Hualien 1–0 Taichung Blue Whale

The 2021 Taichung Blue Whale season was the club's 8th season and their 8th season in Taiwan Mulan Football League.

On 25 December 2021, the Blue Whales clinched their 4th league champion.

== Kits ==
- Supplier: MIE Jersey
- Main Sponsor: YE Sports

== Management team ==
Position	Name
Head coach	(Chinese Taipei) Lu Kuei-hua
Assistant coaches	(Chinese Taipei) Chang Wei-chen, (Chinese Taipei) Cheng Ya-hsun, (Chinese Taipei) Lai Li-chin
Goalkeeping coach	(Chinese Taipei) Chang Po-hsiang
Athletic trainer	(Chinese Taipei) Hong Chia-ling

- Last updated: 22 March 2024

== Players ==
N	Pos.	Nat.	Name	Age.	Since
Goalkeepers
1	GK	(Hong Kong)	Ng Cheuk Wai	24	2020
18	GK	(Chinese Taipei)	Wu Fang-yu	16	2020
19	GK	(Thailand)	Nattaruja Muthtanawech	25	2021
Defenders
3	DF	(Chinese Taipei)	Shen Yen-chun	22	2020
4	DF	(Chinese Taipei)	Lai Wei-ju (captain)	27	2014
7	DF	(Chinese Taipei)	Pan Shin-yu	24	2020
12	DF	(Chinese Taipei)	Wu Yu	23	2018
13	DF	(Chinese Taipei)	Chang Wei-chen	32	2021
15	DF	(Chinese Taipei)	Wang Shu-wen	20	2018
25	DF	(Chinese Taipei)	Yeh Yu-hsuan	19	2021
Midfielders
2	MF	(Chinese Taipei)	Chang Chi-lan	25	2014
6	MF	(Thailand)	Pitsamai Sornsai	32	2021
8	MF	(Japan)	Iori Hidaka	20	2021
14	MF	(Japan)	Maho Tanaka	20	2019
16	MF	(Chinese Taipei)	Hou Fang-wei	29	2014
21	MF	(United States)	Mariel Gutierrez	24	2021
23	MF	(Chinese Taipei)	Liu Chien-yun	29	2014
Forwards
5	FW	(Chinese Taipei)	Pao Hsin-hsuan	29	2018
9	FW	(Chinese Taipei)	Nien Ching-yun	19	2020
10	FW	(Chinese Taipei)	Su Yu-hsuan	20	2021
11	FW	(Chinese Taipei)	Lai Li-chin	33	2015
17	FW	(Chinese Taipei)	Lee Yi-hsun	19	2021
20	FW	(Chinese Taipei)	Chien Hsuan-ying	16	2021
24	FW	(Chinese Taipei)	Sung Jui-hsuan	16	2021

- Ordered by squad number.

== Transfers ==
=== In ===
No.	Pos.	Player	Transferred from	Source
Preseason
6	MF	Pitsamai Sornsai	(Chinese Taipei) Inter Taoyuan	
10	FW	Su Yu-hsuan	(Japan) Okayama Yunogo Belle	
13	DF	Chang Wei-chen	—	
17	FW	Lee Yi-hsun	—	
20	FW	Chien Hsuan-ying	(Chinese Taipei) Taichung Blue Whale U15	
21	MF	Mariel Gutierrez	—	
24	FW	Sung Jui-hsuan	—	
25	DF	Yeh Yu-hsuan	—	
Midseason
8	MF	Iori Hidaka	(Japan) Ibaraki	
19	GK	Nattaruja Muthtanawech	(Thailand) College of Asian Scholars	

=== Out ===
No.	Pos.	Player	Transferred to	Fee	Source
Preseason
1	GK	Chen Miao-wen	—		
6	FW	Lai Yu-chi	—		
9	MF	Lin Yu-syuan	(Chinese Taipei) Taichung Blue Whale U18		
10	FW	Lee Hsiu-chin	(Chinese Taipei) Kaohsiung Sunny Bank		
13	DF	Tseng Wen-ting	(Chinese Taipei) Kaohsiung Sunny Bank		
17	MF	Chan Pi-han	(Chinese Taipei) Hualien		
18	GK	Lin Yi-han	(Chinese Taipei) Kaohsiung Sunny Bank	Loan return	
20	DF	Chen Yu-tung	—		
Midseason
8	MF	Hsieh Cheng-ya	(Chinese Taipei) NTUS Blue Whale		
19	DF	Yang Hsin-ju	(Chinese Taipei) NTUS Blue Whale		
22	DF	Li Pei-jung	(Chinese Taipei) NTUS Blue Whale		

== Competitions ==
=== Overall record ===
Competition	First match	Last match	Starting round	Final position	Record							
Competition	First match	Last match	Starting round	Final position	Pld	W	D	L	GF	GA	GD	Win %
Taiwan Mulan Football League	10 April 2021	25 December 2021	Matchday 1	Winners	10	7	2	1	22	3	+19	70.00
Total					10	7	2	1	22	3	+19	70.00

=== Taiwan Mulan Football League ===
==== League table ====
Pos	Team	Pld	W	D	L	GF	GA	GD	Pts	Qualification or relegation
1	Taichung Blue Whale (C)	10	7	2	1	22	3	+19	23	Qualification for the AFC Women's Club Championship
2	Hualien	10	6	2	2	16	3	+13	20	
3	Kaohsiung Sunny Bank	10	6	2	2	17	9	+8	20	
4	New Taipei Hang Yuen	10	3	3	4	10	10	0	12	
5	Taipei Bravo	10	2	2	6	7	15	−8	8	
6	Inter Taoyuan (R)	10	0	1	9	0	32	−32	1	Transfer to 2022 Taiwan Mulan Football League qualifiers

(C) Champions; (R) Relegated

==== Results by round ====
Round	1	2	3	4	5	6	7	8	9	10
Result	D	W	W	W	W	L	D	W	W	W
Position	3	3	2	2	1	2	2	1	1	1

W = Win; D = Draw; L = Loss

==== Matches ====
10 April 2021 1	Taichung Blue Whale	0–0	Hualien	Taichung
16:30 (UTC+8)		Recap		Stadium: Taiyuan Football Field; Referee: Wang Chieh

17 April 2021 2	Kaohsiung Sunny Bank	0–2	Taichung Blue Whale	Kaohsiung
16:30 (UTC+8)		Recap	Sornsai 16'; Hou Fang-wei 44'	Stadium: National Stadium; Referee: Lee Yi-chi

1 May 2021 3	Taichung Blue Whale	4–0	Taipei Bravo	Taichung
16:00 (UTC+8)	Pao Hsin-hsuan 23', 57'; Sornsai 47'; Su Yu-hsuan 70'	Recap		Stadium: Taiyuan Football Field; Referee: Chao You-lin

20 November 2021 4	Taichung Blue Whale	3–1	New Taipei Hang Yuen	Taichung
15:00 (UTC+8)	Lai Li-chin 18', 55'; Lai Wei-ju 81'	Recap	Liu Yi-fang 6'	Stadium: Taiyuan Football Field; Referee: Chao You-lin

23 November 2021 5	Inter Taoyuan	0–4	Taichung Blue Whale	Taoyuan
14:00 (UTC+8)		Recap	Sornsai 2', 11'; Lee Yi-hsun 40'; Su Yu-hsuan 45+2'	Stadium: Qingpu Football Field; Referee: Yang Shu-ting

27 November 2021 6	Hualien	1–0	Taichung Blue Whale	Hualien
17:30 (UTC+8)	Chen Ya-hui 27'	Recap		Stadium: Mei Lun Junior High School; Referee: Huang Po-chun

4 December 2021 7	Taichung Blue Whale	1–1	Kaohsiung Sunny Bank	Taichung
15:00 (UTC+8)	Tanaka 40'	Recap	Ting Chi 90+1'	Stadium: Taiyuan Football Field; Referee: Wang Chieh (football)

11 December 2021 8	Taichung Blue Whale	2–0	Taipei Bravo	Taichung
15:00 (UTC+8)	Lai Li-chin 31'; Tanaka 41'	Recap		Stadium: Taiyuan Football Field; Referee: Yang Chang-pei

18 December 2021 9	New Taipei Hang Yuen	0–2	Taichung Blue Whale	New Taipei
16:00 (UTC+8)		Recap	Tanaka 22', 30'	Stadium: Fu Jen Catholic University; Referee: Yang Shu-ting

25 December 2021 10	Taichung Blue Whale	4–0	Inter Taoyuan	Taichung
16:00 (UTC+8)	Tanaka 17' (pen.); Lai Li-chin 44', 45+2'; Su Yu-hsuan 83'	Recap		Stadium: Taiyuan Football Field; Referee: Wang Chieh

== Statistics ==
=== Squad statistics ===
No.	Pos	Nat	Player	Total		TMFL	
No.	Pos	Nat	Player	Apps	Goals	Apps	Goals
Goalkeepers
1	GK	(Hong Kong) HKG	Ng Cheuk Wai	8	0	8	0
18	GK	(Chinese Taipei) TPE	Wu Fang-yu	1	0	0+1	0
19	GK	(Thailand) THA	Nattaruja Muthtanawech	3	0	2+1	0
Defenders
3	DF	(Chinese Taipei) TPE	Shen Yen-chun	8	0	6+2	0
4	DF	(Chinese Taipei) TPE	Lai Wei-ju	10	1	10	1
7	DF	(Chinese Taipei) TPE	Pan Shin-yu	10	0	10	0
12	DF	(Chinese Taipei) TPE	Wu Yu	5	0	0+5	0
13	DF	(Chinese Taipei) TPE	Chang Wei-chen	0	0	0	0
15	DF	(Chinese Taipei) TPE	Wang Shu-wen	4	0	3+1	0
25	DF	(Chinese Taipei) TPE	Yeh Yu-hsuan	0	0	0	0
Midfielders
2	MF	(Chinese Taipei) TPE	Chang Chi-lan	10	0	10	0
6	MF	(Thailand) THA	Pitsamai Sornsai	10	4	10	4
8	MF	(Japan) JPN	Iori Hidaka	1	0	0+1	0
14	MF	(Japan) JPN	Maho Tanaka	8	5	8	5
16	MF	(Chinese Taipei) TPE	Hou Fang-wei	9	1	7+2	1
21	MF	(United States) USA	Mariel Gutierrez	5	0	2+3	0
23	MF	(Chinese Taipei) TPE	Liu Chien-yun	9	0	8+1	0
Forwards
5	FW	(Chinese Taipei) TPE	Pao Hsin-hsuan	3	2	3	2
9	FW	(Chinese Taipei) TPE	Nien Ching-yun	9	0	1+8	0
10	FW	(Chinese Taipei) TPE	Su Yu-hsuan	8	3	5+3	3
11	FW	(Chinese Taipei) TPE	Lai Li-chin	10	5	10	5
17	FW	(Chinese Taipei) TPE	Lee Yi-hsun	8	1	4+4	1
20	FW	(Chinese Taipei) TPE	Chien Hsuan-ying	2	0	0+2	0
24	FW	(Chinese Taipei) TPE	Sung Jui-hsuan	2	0	0+2	0
Players who left during the season but made an appearance
22	DF	(Chinese Taipei) TPE	Li Pei-jung	3	0	3	0
Own goals (0)

=== Goalscorers ===
Rank	No.	Pos.	Nat.	Player	TMFL	Total
1	11	FW	(Chinese Taipei)	Lai Li-chin	5	5
1	14	MF	(Japan)	Maho Tanaka	5	5
3	6	MF	(Thailand)	Pitsamai Sornsai	4	4
4	10	FW	(Chinese Taipei)	Su Yu-hsuan	3	3
5	5	FW	(Chinese Taipei)	Pao Hsin-hsuan	2	2
6	4	DF	(Chinese Taipei)	Lai Wei-ju	1	1
6	16	MF	(Chinese Taipei)	Hou Fang-wei	1	1
6	17	FW	(Chinese Taipei)	Lee Yi-hsun	1	1
Own goals (from the opponents)					—	0
Totals					22	22

=== Cleansheets ===
Rank	No.	Nat.	Player	TMFL	Total
1	1	(Hong Kong)	Ng Cheuk Wai	3	3
2	19	(Thailand)	Nattaruja Muthtanawech	2	2
3	18	(Chinese Taipei)	Wu Fang-yu	0	0
Totals				5	5

== Awards ==
Player	Position	Award	Ref.
(Chinese Taipei) Lu Kuei-hua	Head coach	Best Coach	
(Chinese Taipei) Lai Li-chin	Forward	Golden boot	
(Chinese Taipei) Maho Tanaka	Midfielder	Golden boot	
