= 2026–27 Taiwan Mulan Football League =

Taiwan Mulan Football League
- Season: 2026–27
- Dates: 9 October 2026 – 29 May 2027
- Matches: 15
- Goals: 47 (3.13 per match)
- Top goalscorer: Chang Chi-lan (4 goals)
- Biggest home win: Taichung Blue Whale 5–0 Hualien (17 October 2026)
- Biggest away win: Valkyrie 0–8 Kaohsiung Attackers (17 October 2026); Taipei Bravo PlayOne 0–8 New Taipei Hang Yuan (17 October 2026)
- Highest scoring: Valkyrie 0–8 Kaohsiung Attackers (17 October 2026); Taipei Bravo PlayOne 0–8 New Taipei Hang Yuan (17 October 2026)
- Longest winning run: New Taipei Hang Yuan; Sunny Bank AC Taipei; Taichung Blue Whale (3 matches)
- Longest unbeaten run: New Taipei Hang Yuan; Sunny Bank AC Taipei; Taichung Blue Whale (3 matches)
- Longest winless run: Taipei Bravo PlayOne; Valkyrie (4 matches)
- Longest losing run: Valkyrie (4 matches)
- All statistics correct as of 7 November 2026.

The 2026–27 Taiwan Mulan Football League is the 13th season of Taiwan Mulan Football League. The season begins on 9 October 2026 and ends on 29 May 2027.

== Teams ==
=== Promotions and relegations ===
Valkyrie and Taipei Bravo PlayOne, finishing 7th and 8th in 2025–26 season were required to play in the 2026–27 Taiwan Mulan Football League qualifiers. Both teams eventually qualified from the qualifiers.

=== Teams and locations ===
Team	Chinese	Based in	Seasons in TMFL	First season in TMFL
Hualien	花蓮	Hualien County	13	2014
Kaohsiung Attackers	高雄Attackers	Kaohsiung City	11	2016
New Taipei Hang Yuan	新北航源	New Taipei City	9	2017
Sunny Bank AC Taipei	陽信北競	Taipei City	2	2025–26
Taichung Blue Whale	台中藍鯨	Taichung City	13	2014
Taichung Sakura	台中櫻花	Taichung City	2	2025–26
Taipei Bravo PlayOne	臺北熊讚PlayOne	Taipei City	10	2017
Valkyrie	女武神	Taipei City	2	2025–26

=== Venues ===
Taiwan Mulan Football League teams currently don't play all their home games in a specific home ground. Some venues will hold two different matches in a single matchday.

Location of venues in 2026–27 Taiwan Mulan Football League

Stadium	Chinese	Location	Capacity
Banqiao First Stadium	板橋第一運動場	New Taipei City	30,000
Chiayi County Stadium	嘉義縣立田徑場	Chiayi County	30,000
Fu Jen Catholic University Stadium	輔仁大學足球場	New Taipei City	3,000
Hsinchu County Second Stadium	新竹縣立第二體育場	Hsinchu County	2,500
Hualien Stadium	花蓮縣立田徑場	Hualien County	12,800
Kaohsiung Nanzih Football Stadium	高雄市立楠梓足球場	Kaohsiung City	1,200
Ming Chuan University Taoyuan Campus	銘傳大學龜山校區	Taoyuan City	5,000
Taichung Football Sports and Leisure Park	台中南屯足球園區	Taichung City	6,000
Taipei Municipal Stadium	臺北田徑場	Taipei City	20,000
Taiyuan Football Field	太原足球場	Taichung City	600
Xitun Football Field	西屯足球場	Taichung City	200
Xizhi Sports Field	汐止綜合運動場	New Taipei City	466

=== Foreign players ===
- Players name in **bold** indicates the player was registered during the mid-season transfer window.

Club	Player 1	Player 2	Player 3	Player 4	Player 5	Player 6	Player 7	Former player (s)
Hualien								
Kaohsiung Attackers	(Brazil) Flavia Feliciano	(Japan) Kirara Fujio	(Spain) Martuka	(Japan) Yoshimi Miki	(Japan) Mei Sugita	(Bulgaria) Aleksandra Yaneva		
New Taipei Hang Yuan	(Japan) Kano Miyamoto	(Japan) Kaede Nakamura	(Japan) Yuka Nishiyama	(Japan) Kotomi Nitta	(Japan) Mai Okubo	(Japan) Moe Ota		
Sunny Bank AC Taipei	(Thailand) Kanyarat Aikawa	(Thailand) Jirakarn Chaimongkhol	(United States) Liz Harrington					
Taichung Blue Whale	(Philippines) Anicka Castañeda	(Nicaragua) Erica Cunningham	(Philippines) Nina Meollo	(Thailand) Saowalak Pengngam	(Japan) Mizuka Sato	(Thailand) Pitsamai Sornsai	(Thailand) Chotmanee Thongmongkol	
Taichung Sakura	(Japan) Iori Hidaka							
Taipei Bravo PlayOne	(Japan) Masano Yamada							
Valkyrie	(South Korea) Kim Ha-ram	(South Korea) Lyu Ji-min						

=== Personnel and sponsorship ===
Team	Manager	Captain	Kit manufacturer	Main kit sponsor
Hualien	(Taiwan) Luo Hui-tsu	(Chinese Taipei) Lin Kai-ling	(Spain) Joma	—N/a
Kaohsiung Attackers	(Spain) Jose Rojas	(Japan) Yoshimi Miki	(Japan) Athleta	Matrix Fitness
New Taipei Hang Yuan	(Taiwan) Hung Chin-hwai	(Chinese Taipei) Su Hsin-yun	(Taiwan) Entes	—N/a
Sunny Bank AC Taipei	(Spain) Ruben Fortunato	(Chinese Taipei) Hsu Yi-yun	(China) Ucan	Sunny Bank
Taichung Blue Whale	(Spain) Josep Maria Roma Gibert	(Chinese Taipei) Chen Ying-hui	(Japan) Athleta	Skechers
Taichung Sakura	(Taiwan) Hou Fang-wei	(Chinese Taipei) Huang Yu-chen	(Spain) Joma	Footballer
Taipei Bravo PlayOne	(Taiwan) Peng Sheng-wei	(Chinese Taipei) Hsieh Yi-ling	(Spain) Joma	Formosa Pharmaceuticals, Inc.
Valkyrie	(Spain) David Gonzalez	(Chinese Taipei) Yang Ya-han	(Spain) Joma	—N/a

=== Managerial changes ===
Team	Outgoing manager	Manner of departure	Date of vacancy	Position in table	Incoming manager	Date of appointment
Taipei Bravo PlayOne	(Jamaica) Oliver Harley	End of contract	23 May 2026	Pre-season	(Taiwan) Peng Sheng-wei	29 August 2026
Taichung Blue Whale	(Taiwan) Lu Kuei-hua	Assigned to club director	10 June 2026	Pre-season	(Spain) Josep Maria Roma Gibert	7 August 2026
Valkyrie	(Taiwan) Lo Chih-an	Signed by Tatung	1 July 2026	Pre-season	(Spain) David Gonzalez	2 September 2026

== League table ==
Pos	Team	Pld	W	D	L	GF	GA	GD	Pts	Qualification or relegation
1	New Taipei Hang Yuan	3	3	0	0	12	0	+12	9	Qualification for the AFC Women's Champions League
2	Taichung Blue Whale	4	3	0	1	10	2	+8	9	
3	Kaohsiung Attackers	4	3	0	1	17	2	+15	9	
4	Sunny Bank AC Taipei	4	3	0	1	4	3	+1	9	
5	Taichung Sakura	4	2	1	1	3	2	+1	7	
6	Taipei Bravo PlayOne	4	0	1	3	0	15	−15	1	
7	Hualien	3	0	0	3	1	10	−9	0	Qualification for the 2027–28 Taiwan Mulan Football League qualifiers
8	Valkyrie	4	0	0	4	0	13	−13	0	Qualification for the 2027–28 Taiwan Mulan Football League qualifiers

Updated to match(es) played on 7 November 2026. Source:
Rules for classification: 1) Points; 2) Head-to-head points; 3) Head-to-head goal difference; 4) Head-to-head goals scored; 5) Overall goal difference; 6) Overall goals scored; 7) Fewer disciplinary points; 8) Draw lots

=== Position by round ===
Team ╲ Round	1	2	4	5	3^{1}	6	7	8	9	10	11	12	13	14	15	16	17	18	19	20	21
Hualien	8	7	7	7																	
Kaohsiung Attackers	1	1	3	3																	
New Taipei Hang Yuan	2	2	1	1																	
Sunny Bank AC Taipei	2	3	2	4																	
Taipei Bravo PlayOne	4	6	6	6																	
Taichung Blue Whale	7	4	4	2																	
Taichung Sakura	5	5	5	5																	
Valkyrie	6	8	8	8																	

Updated to match(es) played on 7 November 2026. Source:
= Champions and qualification for the AFC Women's Champions League; = Qualification for the 2027–28 Taiwan Mulan Football League qualifiers

^{1} Matchweek 3 was postponed due to Typhoon Champi.

== Results ==
=== Qualifiers ===
CTBC Dong Men Cheng, Hsinchu Science City, Taipei Bravo PlayOne, and Valkyrie were the teams that had signed up for the qualifiers. The CTFA rejected CTBC Dong Men Cheng's participation after reviewing all teams' applications.

Pos	Team	Pld	W	D	L	GF	GA	GD	Pts	Qualification or relegation
1	Valkyrie	2	1	1	0	2	1	+1	4	Qualification for the 2026–27 Taiwan Mulan Football League
2	Taipei Bravo PlayOne	2	0	2	0	0	0	0	2	Qualification for the 2026–27 Taiwan Mulan Football League
3	Hsinchu Science City	2	0	1	1	1	2	−1	1	Eliminated

6 June 2026
15:30 (UTC+8)

Taipei Bravo PlayOne	0–0	Hsinchu Science City
	Recap

Yingfeng Riverside Park, Taipei
13 June 2026
15:30 (UTC+8)

Hsinchu Science City	1–2	Valkyrie
Nguyễn Phương Linh 45+1'	Recap	Kao Hsin 30', 51' (pen.)

Ming Chuan University, Taoyuan
19 June 2026
15:30 (UTC+8)

Valkyrie	0–0	Taipei Bravo PlayOne
	Recap

Yingfeng Riverside Park, Taipei

=== Regular season ===
Each team plays a total of 21 games, playing the other teams three times.

Home \ Away	HUA	KHA	NTH	SAC	TBW	TCS	TBP	VAL	HUA	KHA	NTH	SAC	TBW	TCS	TBP	VAL	HUA	KHA	NTH	SAC	TBW	TCS	TBP	VAL
Hualien		26 Dec	TBD	20 Mar	9 Jan	1–2	12 Dec	TBD		24 Mar	—	29 May	—	—	13 Mar	2 May		—	—	—	—	—	—	—
Kaohsiung Attackers	3–0		23 Jan	12 Dec	20 Mar	29 Nov	30 Jan	28 Mar	—		8 May	22 May	29 May	30 Apr	—	—	—		—	—	—	—	—	—
New Taipei Hang Yuan	30 Jan	2–0		TBD	26 Dec	20 Mar	9 Jan	13 Mar	15 May	—		1 May	—	29 May	—	22 May	—	—		—	—	—	—	—
Sunny Bank AC Taipei	19 Dec	14 Mar	16 Jan		30 Jan	1–0	1–0	2–0	—	—	—		15 May	28 Mar	23 Jan	—	—	—	—		—	—	—	—
Taichung Blue Whale	5–0	19 Dec	0–2	3–0		12 Dec	TBD	2–0	28 Mar	—	24 Mar	—		—	16 Jan	—	—	—	—	—		—	2 May	—
Taichung Sakura	23 Jan	16 Jan	19 Dec	9 Jan	13 Mar		0–0	30 Jan	8 May	—	—	—	22 May		26 Dec	15 May	—	—	—	—	—		—	—
Taipei Bravo PlayOne	22 May	0–6	0–8	8 May	—	24 Apr		20 Mar	—	15 May	28 Mar	—	—	—		29 May	—	—	—	—	—	—		—
Valkyrie	16 Jan	0–8	12 Dec	26 Dec	23 Jan	0–1	19 Dec		—	9 Jan	—	24 Apr	8 May	—	—		—	—	—	—	—	—	—	

Updated to match(es) played on 7 November 2026. Source:
Legend: Blue = home team win; Yellow = draw; Red = away team win.

=== Results by round ===
Team ╲ Round	1	2	4	5	3^{1}	6	7	8	9	10	11	12	13	14	15	16	17	18	19	20	21
Hualien	L	L	L																		
Kaohsiung Attackers	W	W	L	W																	
New Taipei Hang Yuan	W	W	W																		
Sunny Bank AC Taipei	W	W	W	L																	
Taichung Blue Whale	L	W	W	W																	
Taichung Sakura	D	L	W	W																	
Taipei Bravo PlayOne	D	L	L	L																	
Valkyrie	L	L	L	L																	

Updated to match(es) played on 7 November 2026. Source:
W = Win; D = Draw; L = Loss

^{1} Matchweek 3 was postponed due to Typhoon Champi.

== Statistics ==
=== Scoring ===
- First goal of the season:
  (Brazil) Flavia Feliciano (Kaohsiung Attackers) against Hualien (9 October 2026)

=== Top goalscorers ===
Rank	Player	Club	Goals
1	(Chinese Taipei) Chang Chi-lan	Kaohsiung Attackers	4
2	(Japan) Kotomi Nitta	New Taipei Hang Yuan	3
2	(Chinese Taipei) Maho Tanaka	Taichung Blue Whale	3
2	(Bulgaria) Aleksandra Yaneva	Kaohsiung Attackers	3
5	(Brazil) Flavia Feliciano	Kaohsiung Attackers	2
5	(Japan) Kirara Fujio	Kaohsiung Attackers	2
5	(Chinese Taipei) He Jia-shiuan	New Taipei Hang Yuan	2
5	(Chinese Taipei) Lin Ya-hsuan	Taichung Blue Whale	2
5	(Chinese Taipei) Ting Chi	Kaohsiung Attackers	2
5	(Chinese Taipei) Wu Kai-ching	Kaohsiung Attackers	2

==== Hat-tricks ====
Player	For	Against	Score	Date	Round
(Japan) Kotomi Nitta	New Taipei Hang Yuan	Taipei Bravo PlayOne	8–0 (A)	17 October 2026	2

=== Clean Sheets ===
Rank	Player	Club	Shutouts
1	(United States) Liz Harrington	Sunny Bank AC Taipei	3
1	(Japan) Yoshimi Miki	Kaohsiung Attackers	3
1	(Chinese Taipei) Wang Yu-ting	New Taipei Hang Yuan	3
4	(Chinese Taipei) Huang Shou-mei	Taichung Sakura	1
4	(Chinese Taipei) Lin Chia-chi	Taichung Sakura	1
4	(Philippines) Nina Meollo	Taichung Blue Whale	1
4	(Thailand) Chotmanee Thongmongkol	Taichung Blue Whale	1
4	(Chinese Taipei) Tseng Min-hsien	Taipei Bravo PlayOne	1
4	(Chinese Taipei) Wang Juo-ping	Taichung Blue Whale	1

=== Discipline ===
==== Player ====
- Most yellow cards: 1
  - (Japan) Kirara Fujio (Kaohsiung Attackers)
  - (Chinese Taipei) Hsu Wei-yun (Sunny Bank AC Taipei)
  - (Chinese Taipei) Huang Yu-chen (Taichung Sakura)
  - (Chinese Taipei) Jhuo Li-shan (Hualien)
  - (Chinese Taipei) Lee Jou-hsuan (Taichung Sakura)
  - (Chinese Taipei) Liu Yu-chiao (New Taipei Hang Yuan)
  - (Japan) Kano Miyamoto (New Taipei Hang Yuan)
  - (Thailand) Pitsamai Sornsai (Taichung Blue Whale)
  - (Chinese Taipei) Ma Ho-ya (Valkyrie)
  - (Chinese Taipei) Wei Tsai-hua (Taipei Bravo Playone)
- Most red cards: 0

==== Team ====
- Most yellow cards: 2
  - New Taipei Hang Yuan
  - Taichung Sakura
- Fewest yellow cards: 1
  - Hualien
  - Kaohsiung Attackers
  - Sunny Bank AC Taipei
  - Taichung Blue Whale
  - Taipei Bravo PlayOne
  - Valkyrie
- Most red cards: 0
  - 8 teams
- Fewest red cards: 0
  - 8 teams

== See also ==
- 2026–27 Taiwan Football Premier League
- 2026–27 Taiwan Football League 2
