= 2023 Taiwan Mulan Football League =

Taiwan Mulan Football League
- Season: 2023
- Dates: 22 April 2023 – 23 December 2023
- Champions: Taichung Blue Whale; 5th title
- AFC Champions League: Taichung Blue Whale
- Matches: 45
- Goals: 92 (2.04 per match)
- Best player: Liu Chien-yun
- Top goalscorer: Chen Yen-ping; Lee Hsiu-chin; Lee Yi-wen (6 goals)
- Best goalkeeper: Tsai Ming-jung
- Biggest home win: Kaohsiung Sunny Bank 3–0 Hualien (1 July 2023)
- Biggest away win: Mars 0–4 New Taipei Hang Yuen (4 November 2023)
- Highest scoring: Hualien 3–2 New Taipei Hang Yuen (8 July 2023)
- Longest winning run: Taichung Blue Whale (4 matches)
- Longest unbeaten run: Taichung Blue Whale (13 matches)
- Longest winless run: Taipei Bravo PlayOne (7 matches)
- Longest losing run: Mars (6 matches)
- All statistics correct as of 1 September 2024.

The 2023 Taiwan Mulan Football League is the 10th season of Taiwan Mulan Football League. The season began on 22 April 2023 and finished on 23 December 2023.

== Teams ==
=== Promotions and relegations ===
Taipei Bravo and Taoyuan Mars, finishing 5th and 6th in 2022 season, were required to play in the qualifiers for the 2023 season. However, no teams had signed up for the qualifiers led both teams remain for the 2023 season.

=== Teams and locations ===
| Team | Chinese | Based in | Seasons in TMFL | First season in TMFL |
|---|---|---|---|---|
| Hualien | 花蓮 | Hualien County | 10 | 2014 |
| Kaohsiung Sunny Bank | 高雄陽信 | Kaohsiung City | 8 | 2016 |
| Mars | 戰神 | Taoyuan City | 2 | 2022 |
| New Taipei Hang Yuen | 新北航源 | New Taipei City | 6 | 2017 |
| Taichung Blue Whale | 台中藍鯨 | Taichung City | 10 | 2014 |
| Taipei Bravo PlayOne | 臺北熊讚PlayOne | Taipei City | 7 | 2017 |

=== Venues ===
Taiwan Mulan Football League teams currently don't play all their home games in a specific home ground. Some venues may hold more than one different matchups in a single matchday.

Location of venues in 2023 Taiwan Mulan Football League

| Stadium | Chinese | Location | Capacity |
|---|---|---|---|
| Banqiao Stadium | 板橋體育場 | New Taipei City | 30,000 |
| Fu Jen Catholic University Stadium | 輔仁大學足球場 | New Taipei City | 3,000 |
| Kaohsiung Nanzih Football Stadium | 高雄市立楠梓足球場 | Kaohsiung City | 1,200 |
| Mei Lun Junior High School | 美崙國中 | Hualien County | |
| Ming Chuan University | 銘傳大學 | Taoyuan City | 5,000 |
| Qingpu Football Field | 青埔足球場 | Taoyuan City | |
| Taipei Municipal Stadium | 臺北田徑場 | Taipei City | 20,000 |
| Taiyuan Football Field | 太原足球場 | Taichung City | 600 |
| Yilan Sports Park Multipurpose Stadium | 宜蘭運動公園複合式運動場 | Yilan County | 15,000 |

=== Foreign players ===
| Club | Player 1 | Player 2 | Player 3 | Player 4 | Player 5 | Former Player |
|---|---|---|---|---|---|---|
| Hualien | | | | | | |
| Kaohsiung Sunny Bank | (Japan) Mizuka Sato | (Japan) Nao Tsukamoto | (Japan) Minori Wakabayashi | | | |
| Mars | | | | | | |
| New Taipei Hang Yuen | (Thailand) Nipawan Panyosuk | (Japan) Yukina Tamamura | (Japan) Miwa Tanaka | | | |
| Taichung Blue Whale | (Thailand) Silawan Intamee | (Thailand) Saowalak Peng-ngam | (Thailand) Phornphirun Philawan | (Thailand) Pitsamai Sornsai | (Japan) Maho Tanaka | (Thailand) Nattaruja Muthtanawech |
| Taipei Bravo PlayOne | | | | | | |

=== Personnel and sponsorship ===
| Team | Manager | Captain | Kit manufacturer | Main kit sponsor |
|---|---|---|---|---|
| Hualien | (Taiwan) Ju Wen-bin | (Chinese Taipei) Tsai Li-chen | Tor Star | Leadtek |
| Kaohsiung Sunny Bank | (Japan) Takeshi Inoguchi | (Chinese Taipei) Wu Kai-ching | Athleta | Sunny Bank |
| Mars | (Taiwan) Hsu Ching-hsin | (Chinese Taipei) Yang Hsiao-chuan | | —N/a |
| New Taipei Hang Yuen | (Taiwan) Hsu Yi | (Chinese Taipei) Chen Ying-hui | Tor Star | —N/a |
| Taichung Blue Whale | (Taiwan) Lu Kuei-hua | (Chinese Taipei) Tsai Ming-jung | MIE | Skechers |
| Taipei Bravo PlayOne | (Taiwan) Chou Tai-ying | (Chinese Taipei) Chen Ruo-wei | Kappa | —N/a |

=== Managerial changes ===
| Team | Outgoing manager | Manner of departure | Date of vacancy | Position in table | Incoming manager | Date of appointment |
|---|---|---|---|---|---|---|
| Taoyuan Mars | (Taiwan) Chen Ching-hsuan | Resigned | 29 November 2022 | Pre-season | (Taiwan) Hsu Ching-hsin | 17 April 2023 |

== League table ==
| Pos | Team | Pld | W | D | L | GF | GA | GD | Pts | Qualification or relegation |
|---|---|---|---|---|---|---|---|---|---|---|
| 1 | Taichung Blue Whale (C) | 15 | 10 | 4 | 1 | 21 | 8 | +13 | 34 | Qualification for the AFC Women's Champions League |
| 2 | New Taipei Hang Yuen | 15 | 8 | 4 | 3 | 24 | 12 | +12 | 28 | |
| 3 | Kaohsiung Sunny Bank | 15 | 6 | 4 | 5 | 15 | 12 | +3 | 22 | |
| 4 | Taipei Bravo PlayOne | 15 | 4 | 5 | 6 | 10 | 14 | −4 | 17 | |
| 5 | Hualien F.C. | 15 | 5 | 2 | 8 | 12 | 19 | −7 | 17 | Required to play in 2024 Taiwan Mulan Football League qualifiers |
| 6 | Mars F.C. | 15 | 2 | 1 | 12 | 10 | 27 | −17 | 7 | Required to play in 2024 Taiwan Mulan Football League qualifiers |

(C) Champions

== Results ==
=== Regular season ===
| Home \ Away | HWF | KSB | MAR | HY | TBW | TBB | HWF | KSB | MAR | HY | TBW | TBB | HWF | KSB | MAR | HY | TBW | TBB |
|---|---|---|---|---|---|---|---|---|---|---|---|---|---|---|---|---|---|---|
| Hualien | — | 1–0 | 1–3 | 0–2 | 0–1 | 0–1 | — | — | 1–0 | 3–2 | 1–2 | 0–1 | — | — | 2–1 | 1–2 | — | 2–1 |
| Kaohsiung Sunny Bank | 3–0 | — | 1–0 | 2–1 | 1–1 | 1–1 | 0–0 | — | 1–2 | 0–0 | 0–3 | 1–0 | — | — | — | 1–2 | — | — |
| Mars | — | 0–2 | — | 0–2 | — | 1–1 | — | — | — | 0–4 | — | — | — | — | — | 1–3 | — | — |
| New Taipei Hang Yuen | — | — | — | — | — | — | — | — | — | — | — | — | — | — | — | — | — | — |
| Taichung Blue Whale | 0–0 | 1–0 | 2–1 | 0–1 | — | 1–1 | — | — | 3–1 | 2–1 | — | 1–0 | — | — | 1–0 | 1–1 | — | — |
| Taipei Bravo PlayOne | — | 0–2 | 2–0 | 1–1 | 0–2 | — | — | — | 1–0 | 0–2 | — | — | — | — | — | 0–0 | — | — |

Updated to match(es) played on 24 August 2024. Source: TMFL
Legend: Blue = home team win; Yellow = draw; Red = away team win.

== Season statistics ==
=== Scoring ===
- First goal of the season:
  (Taiwan) Kao Chen-en for Taipei Bravo PlayOne against Taoyuan Mars (22 April 2023)
- Final goal of the season:
  (Taiwan) Lin Ya-han for Taipei Bravo PlayOne against Hualien (23 December 2023)

=== Top goalscorers ===
| Rank | Player | Club | Goals |
|---|---|---|---|
| 1 | (Taiwan) Chen Yen-ping | New Taipei Hang Yuen | 6 |
| 1 | (Taiwan) Lee Hsiu-chin | Kaohsiung Sunny Bank | 6 |
| 1 | (Taiwan) Lee Yi-wen | New Taipei Hang Yuen | 6 |

== Awards ==
=== Annual Awards CTFA 2023 ===
| Award | Winner | Club | Ref. |
|---|---|---|---|
| Player of the Year | (Taiwan) Liu Chien-yun | Taichung Blue Whale | |
| Coach of the Year | (Taiwan) Lu Kuei-hua | Taichung Blue Whale | |
| Golden Boot | (Taiwan) Chen Yen-ping | New Taipei Hang Yuen | |
| Golden Boot | (Taiwan) Lee Hsiu-chin | Kaohsiung Sunny Bank | |
| Golden Boot | (Taiwan) Lee Yi-wen | New Taipei Hang Yuen | |
| Golden Gloves | (Taiwan) Tsai Ming-jung | Taichung Blue Whale | |
