= 2024 Taiwan Mulan Football League =

Taiwan Mulan Football League
- Season: 2024
- Dates: 13 April 2024 – 16 November 2024
- Champions: Kaohsiung Attackers (1st title)
- AFC Champions League: Kaohsiung Attackers
- Matches: 29
- Goals: 76 (2.62 per match)
- Top goalscorer: Lee Yi-wen (8 goals)
- Biggest home win: New Taipei Hang Yuen 5–0 Mars (17 August 2024)
- Biggest away win: Hualien 1–5 New Taipei Hang Yuen (18 May 2024); Hualien 0–4 New Taipei Hang Yuen (29 June 2024)
- Highest scoring: Hualien 1–5 New Taipei Hang Yuen (18 May 2024); New Taipei Hang Yuen 5–0 Mars (17 August 2024)
- Longest winning run: Kaohsiung Attackers (4 matches)
- Longest unbeaten run: Kaohsiung Attackers; Taichung Blue Whale (6 matches)
- Longest winless run: Hualien (8 matches)
- Longest losing run: Hualien (5 matches)
- Highest attendance: 450; Kaohsiung Attackers 2–0 New Taipei Hang Yuen (15 June 2024)
- Lowest attendance: 6 Kaohsiung Attackers 0–0 Mars (18 May 2024)
- All statistics correct as of 31 August 2024.

The 2024 Taiwan Mulan Football League is the 11th season of Taiwan Mulan Football League. The season began on 13 April 2024 and scheduled to finish on 16 November 2024.

== Teams ==
=== Promotions and relegations ===
Hualien and Mars, finishing 5th and 6th in 2023 season were required to play in the 2024 TMFL qualifiers. Both teams had remained for the 2024 season after qualifying from the qualifiers.

=== Teams and locations ===
Team	Chinese	Based in	Seasons in TMFL	First season in TMFL
Hualien	花蓮	Hualien County	11	2014
Kaohsiung Attackers	高雄Attackers	Kaohsiung City	9	2016
Mars	戰神	Taoyuan City	3	2022
New Taipei Hang Yuen	新北航源	New Taipei City	7	2017
Taichung Blue Whale	台中藍鯨	Taichung City	11	2014
Taipei Bravo PlayOne	臺北熊讚PlayOne	Taipei City	8	2017

=== Venues ===
Taiwan Mulan Football League teams currently don't play all their home games in a specific home ground. Some venues may hold more than one different matchups in a single matchday.

Location of venues in 2024 Taiwan Mulan Football League

Stadium	Chinese	Location	Capacity
Fu Jen Catholic University Stadium	輔仁大學足球場	New Taipei City	3,000
Hualien Stadium	花蓮縣立田徑場	Hualien County	12,800
Kaohsiung Nanzih Football Stadium	高雄市立楠梓足球場	Kaohsiung City	1,200
National Taiwan Sport University	國立體育大學	Taoyuan City	3,000
Taipei Municipal Stadium	臺北田徑場	Taipei City	20,000
Taiyuan Football Field	太原足球場	Taichung City	600
Yilan Sports Park Multipurpose Stadium	宜蘭運動公園複合式運動場	Yilan County	15,000

=== Foreign players ===
Club	Player 1	Player 2	Player 3	Player 4	Player 5	Player 6	Player 7
Hualien							
Kaohsiung Attackers	(Japan) Kokoro Hirata	(Cambodia) Melanie Hoekstra	(Japan) Yoshimi Miki	(Japan) Nao Tsukamoto	(Japan) Yumi Uetsuji	(Hong Kong) Wai Yuen Ting	(Japan) Minori Wakabayashi
Mars							
New Taipei Hang Yuen	(Thailand) Pattaranan Aupachai	(Japan) Saki Matsunaga	(Thailand) Nipawan Panyosuk	(Japan) Miwa Tanaka			
Taichung Blue Whale	(Thailand) Waraporn Boonsing	(Thailand) Silawan Intamee	(Thailand) Saowalak Peng-ngam	(Thailand) Pitsamai Sornsai	(Japan) Maho Tanaka		
Taipei Bravo PlayOne							

=== Personnel and sponsorship ===
Team	Manager	Captain	Kit manufacturer	Main kit sponsor
Hualien	(Taiwan) Ju Wen-bin	(Chinese Taipei) Chen Ya-hui	Tor Star	Leadtek
Kaohsiung Attackers	(Japan) Takeshi Inoguchi	(Japan) Yoshimi Miki	Athleta	Matrix Fitness
Mars	(Taiwan) Hsu Ching-hsin	(Chinese Taipei) Pu Hsin-hui		—N/a
New Taipei Hang Yuen	(Taiwan) Hung Chin-hwai	(Chinese Taipei) Chen Ying-hui	Tor Star	—N/a
Taichung Blue Whale	(Taiwan) Lu Kuei-hua	(Chinese Taipei) Tsai Ming-jung	MIE	Skechers
Taipei Bravo PlayOne	(Taiwan) Shieh Su-jean	(Chinese Taipei) Chen Ruo-wei	Kappa	PlayOne

=== Managerial changes ===
Team	Outgoing manager	Manner of departure	Date of vacancy	Position in table	Incoming manager	Date of appointment
New Taipei Hang Yuen	(Taiwan) Hsu Yi	Assigned to Chinese Taipei	24 January 2024	Pre-season	(Taiwan) Hung Chin-hwai	6 March 2024
Taipei Bravo PlayOne	(Taiwan) Chou Tai-ying	Mutual consent	31 December 2023	Pre-season	(Taiwan) Hsieh Su-chen	1 January 2024

== League table ==
Pos	Team	Pld	W	D	L	GF	GA	GD	Pts	Qualification or relegation
1	Kaohsiung Attackers (C)	15	10	4	1	23	6	+17	34	Qualification for the AFC Women's Champions League
2	Taichung Blue Whale	15	9	3	3	28	15	+13	30	
3	New Taipei Hang Yuen	15	9	2	4	29	12	+17	29	
4	Taipei Bravo PlayOne	15	5	2	8	15	20	−5	17	
5	Hualien	15	2	3	10	7	27	−20	9	Required to play in 2025 Taiwan Mulan Football League qualifiers
6	Mars	15	2	2	11	11	33	−22	8	Required to play in 2025 Taiwan Mulan Football League qualifiers

Source: TMFL
(C) Champions

== Results ==
=== Qualifiers ===
17 March 2024 Preliminary round	AC Taipei	11–0	Science City	Taoyuan
14:00 (UTC+8)				Stadium: Ming Chuan University

24 March 2024 Qualifying round	Hualien	5–0	Science City	Taoyuan
14:00 (UTC+8)				Stadium: Ming Chuan University

24 March 2024 Qualifying round	Mars	2–1	AC Taipei	Taoyuan
16:30 (UTC+8)				Stadium: Ming Chuan University

=== Regular season ===
Home \ Away	HWF	ATK	MAR	HY	TBW	TBP	HWF	ATK	MAR	HY	TBW	TBP	HWF	ATK	MAR	HY	TBW	TBP
Hualien	—	0–0	2–1	1–5	1–3	1–1	—	Sep 28	0–1	0–4	—	—	—	—	—	—	—	—
Kaohsiung Attackers	1–0	—	0–0	2–1	1–1	1–2	—	—	Nov 9	2–0	—	Sep 21	—	—	—	Oct 5	—	—
Mars	Nov 2	2–3	—	—	1–4	2–1	—	—	—	—	—	Sep 28	—	—	—	—	—	—
New Taipei Hang Yuen	Nov 9	—	4–1	—	1–1	2–0	—	—	5–0	—	Oct 19	1–0	—	—	Sep 21	—	—	—
Taichung Blue Whale	3–0	0–2	1–1	Sep 21	—	3–2	—	Nov 2	Nov 16	Sep 28	—	—	—	—	—	—	—	—
Taipei Bravo PlayOne	1–0	0–1	2–0	Nov 2	0–1	—	Oct 5	—	—	—	Nov 9	—	—	—	—	—	—	—

Updated to match(es) played on 24 August 2024. Source: TMFL
Legend: Blue = home team win; Yellow = draw; Red = away team win.

== Statistics ==
=== Scoring ===
- First goal of the season:
  (Taiwan) Shih Yi-ching for Mars against Taipei Bravo PlayOne (13 April 2024)

=== Top goalscorers ===
Rank	Player	Club	Goals
1	(Taiwan) Lee Yi-wen	New Taipei Hang Yuen	8
2	(Cambodia) Melanie Hoekstra	Kaohsiung Attackers	6
2	(Thailand) Saowalak Peng-ngam	Taichung Blue Whale	6
4	(Taiwan) Lee Hsiu-chin	New Taipei Hang Yuen	4
5	(Thailand) Silawan Intamee	Taichung Blue Whale	3
5	(Taiwan) Wei Tzu-yu	Hualien	3

==== Hat-tricks ====
Player	For	Against	Score	Date	Round
(Taiwan) Lee Yi-wen^{4}	New Taipei Hang Yuen	Mars	5–0 (H)	17 August 2024	9

^{4} – Player scored four goals.

=== Clean Sheets ===
Rank	Player	Club	Shutouts
1	(Japan) Yoshimi Miki	Kaohsiung Attackers	6
2	(Taiwan) Wang Yu-ting	New Taipei Hang Yuen	4
3	(Taiwan) Tsai Ming-jung	Taichung Blue Whale	2
4	(Taiwan) Chien Yu-chieh	Hualien	1
4	(Taiwan) Chiu Yi-hsiu	Mars	1
4	(Taiwan) Hsu Yuan-ting	Taipei Bravo PlayOne	1
4	(Taiwan) Shao Tzu-han	Mars	1
4	(Taiwan) Tseng Min-hsien	Taipei Bravo PlayOne	1
4	(Taiwan) Wang Juo-ping	Kaohsiung Attackers	1

== See also ==
- 2024 Taiwan Football Premier League
- 2024 Taiwan Football League Division 2
