= Nina Meollo =

Filipino footballer (born 2004)

Personal information
- Full name: Nina Andrea Nadera Meollo
- Date of birth: 23 June 2004 (age 22)
- Position: Goalkeeper

Team information
- Current team: Taichung Blue Whale
- Number: 1

Youth career
- Norwich City

Senior career*
Years	Team	Apps	(Gls)
2020–2026	Ipswich Town	3	(0)
2023–2024	→ Cambridge City (loan)	13	(0)
2024–2025	→ AFC Sudbury (loan)	19	(0)
2025–2026	→ Real Bedford (loan)	5	(0)
2026–	Taichung Blue Whale	1	(0)

International career^{‡}
2025–	Philippines	2	(0)
Medal record
Women's football
Representing the Philippines
Southeast Asian Games
Gold medal – first place	2025 Thailand	Team
- * Club domestic league appearances and goals as of 31 October 2026 ‡ National team caps and goals as of 15 March 2026

Nina Andrea Meollo (born 23 June 2004) is a professional footballer who plays as a goalkeeper for Taiwan Mulan Football League club Taichung Blue Whale. Raised in England, she represents the Philippines at international level.

== Early life ==
Born to Filipino parents and grew up in England, Nina Meollo first took up football when she was nine years old. She first joined a local boy's team and was the only girl in the whole league.

== Club career ==
Meollo joined the youth program of Nowich City before moving to Ipswich Town in 2020.

She was released by Ipswich after the end of the 2025/26 season.

=== Real Bedford ===
Real Bedford signed Meollo on a season-loan deal from Ipswich Town for the 2025–26 season. She was released by the club ahead of the 2026–27 season.

== International career ==
In November 2023, Meollo was called up for the first time to the Philippines national football team. She remained part of the squad for multiple friendlies and training camps. Meollo made her international debut on 4 April 2025 in a friendly against United Arab Emirates, which the Philippines won 4–1.

She was part of the squad for the women's football tournament of the 2025 SEA Games in Thailand which won the gold medal.

At the 2026 AFC Women's Asian Cup, Olivia McDaniel was fielded as the Philippines' main goalkeeper. However, in the quarterfinals against Japan, Meollo started as the goalkeeper instead. The Philippines lost 0-7 but Meollo kept Japan from scoring until the last minute of the first half.

== Career statistics ==
As of match played 31 October 2026

Appearances and goals by club, season and competition
Club	Season	League			League Cup (Note: Includes FA Women's National League Cup)		Total	
Club	Season	Division	Apps	Goals	Apps	Goals	Apps	Goals
Ipswich Town	2022–23	National League South	1	0	1	0	2	0
Ipswich Town	2023–24	National League South	2	0	0	0	2	0
Ipswich Town	Total		3	0	1	0	4	0
Cambridge City (loan)	2023–24	National League Div. 1	13	0	2	0	15	0
AFC Sudbury (loan)	2024–25	National League Div. 1	19	0	1	0	20	0
Real Bedford (loan)	2025–26	National League South	5	0	3	0	8	0
Taichung Blue Whale	2026–27	Taiwan Mulan Football League	1	0	0	0	1	0
Career Total			41	0	7	0	48	0

== Honours ==
Philippines

- Southeast Asian Games: 2025
