= Taichung Football Sports and Leisure Park =

Football complex in Nantun, Taichung, Taiwan

- 臺中市國際足球運動休閒園區
- Interactive map of Taichung Football Sports and Leisure Park
- Location: Taichung City, Taiwan
- Coordinates: 24°07′43″N 120°38′15″E
- Owner: Taichung City Government
- Capacity: 6,000
- Surface: Natural grass (Main stadium); Artificial turf (Training pitch and 5-a-side pitches)

Construction
- Groundbreaking: 26 April 2023
- Built: 14 October 2026
- Opened: April 2027 (planned)
- Cost: $1.5 billion NTD
- Architects: WCH Architects & Associates
- Builder: Jinbiao

Tenants
- Taichung Futuro (2026–future); Taichung Blue Whale (2027–future)

National Taichung City Football Sports and Leisure Park is an association football complex under construction in Nantun District, Taichung, Taiwan. It consists a natural grass main stadium, an artificial turf training pitch and two 5-a-side artificial turf pitches. The main stadium includes 6,000 seats. The construction has completed and is scheduled to open around April 2027.

== Background ==
Taichung Football Sports and Leisure Park was one of the football facilities built under the Six-Year Football Development Plan, which was released by Ministry of Education in 2018. The location was originally planned in Beitun District, but was relocated to Nantun District in 2019 due to local public opinions and administrative difficulties. The groundbreaking ceremony was held on 26 April 2023. The construction was completed on 14 October 2026.

== Events ==
The first official match for the complex will be on 13 December 2026, the Taiwan Football Premier League match played on the training pitch between Taichung Futuro and Taiwan Power Company. The first match for the main stadium will be on 24 March 2027, the Taiwan Mulan Football League match between Taichung Blue Whale and New Taipei Hang Yuan.

== See also ==
- Taiyuan Football Field, the current main grounds for various Taichung-based football clubs, opened in 2017.
- Xitun Football Field, the current main grounds for various Taichung-based football clubs, opened in 2024.
- Kaohsiung Nanzih Football Stadium, one of the other football facilities built under the Six-Year Football Development Plan, opened in 2022.
