= Ting Chi =

Taiwanese footballer

Personal information
- Date of birth: 2 June 1995 (age 31)
- Place of birth: Hualien, Taiwan
- Height: 1.60 m (5 ft 3 in)
- Position: Midfielder

Team information
- Current team: Taipei Bravo

Senior career*
Years	Team	Apps	(Gls)
2019	Hualien		
2020	Inter Taoyuan		
2021	Kaohsiung Sunny Bank		
2022	New Taipei Hang Yuan		
2023	Zebra Ladies Iwate		
2024	Box Hill United		
2024–	Taipei Bravo		

International career^{‡}
2016–	Chinese Taipei	20	(3)
	Chinese Taipei (futsal)	5	
- * Club domestic league appearances and goals ‡ National team caps and goals as of 10 February 2020

Ting Chi (Chinese: 丁旗; born 2 June 1995) is a Taiwanese footballer who plays as a midfielder for Taiwan Mulan Football League club Inter Taoyuan and the Chinese Taipei women's national team.

== International goals ==
Scores and results list Chinese Taipei's goal tally first.

No.	Date	Venue	Opponent	Score	Result	Competition
1.	25 March 2018	Amman International Stadium, Amman, Jordan	Jordan	1–1	1–1	Friendly
2.	3 April 2019	Saoud bin Abdulrahman Stadium, Al Wakrah, Qatar	Palestine	3–0	3–0	2020 AFC Women's Olympic Qualifying Tournament
3.	6 April 2019	Grand Hamad Stadium, Doha, Qatar	Philippines	4–2	4–2	2020 AFC Women's Olympic Qualifying Tournament
4.	3 February 2020	Campbelltown Stadium, Sydney, Australia	Thailand	1–0	1–0	2020 AFC Women's Olympic Qualifying Tournament
5.	5 April 2023	Fouad Chehab Stadium, Jounieh, Lebanon	Lebanon	3–1	5–1	2024 AFC Women's Olympic Qualifying Tournament
6.	5 April 2023	Fouad Chehab Stadium, Jounieh, Lebanon	Lebanon	5–1	5–1	2024 AFC Women's Olympic Qualifying Tournament
7.	4 December 2023	Suoka Sports Training Base Pitch 1, Zhuhai, China	Guam	2–0	3–0	2025 EAFF E-1 Football Championship
