= Taichung Blue Whale =

Taiwanese women's football club

- Full name: Taichung Blue Whale
- Founded: 2014; 12 years ago
- Ground: Taiyuan Football Field; Xitun Football Field; Taichung Football Sports and Leisure Park
- Capacity: 600; 200; 6,000
- Head coach: Josep Maria Roma Gibert
- League: Taiwan Mulan Football League
- 2025–26: 3rd
- Website: https://www.tcbw2014.com/
Home colours	Away colours

The Taichung Blue Whale (Chinese: 台中藍鯨女子足球隊) is a Taiwanese professional women's football club based in Taichung. Founded in 2014, it is associated with the National Taiwan University of Sport (NTUS). The team currently competes in the country's top-tier women's domestic competition, the Taiwan Mulan Football League.

== Kits ==
=== Kit manufacturers and shirt sponsors ===
Period	Kit manufacturer	Shirt sponsor (chest)
2014–2015	Adidas	—
2016–2017	Adidas	YE Sports
2018	Adidas	Taichung World Flora Exposition
2019	Adidas	Dah Lih Puh
2020	Adidas	Skechers
2021	Mie	YE Sports
2022–2026	Mie	Skechers
2026–present	Athleta	Skechers

== Players ==
=== Current squad ===
As of 7 November 2026

Note: Flags indicate national team as defined under FIFA eligibility rules; some limited exceptions apply. Players may hold more than one non-FIFA nationality.

No.	Pos.	Nation	Player
1	GK	PHI	Nina Meollo
3	MF	TPE	Lu Tsai-hsuan
4	DF	NCA	Erica Cunningham
5	DF	TPE	Huang Ke-sin
6	MF	TPE	Yang Yi-ai
7	MF	TPE	Lin Ya-hsuan
8	FW	TPE	Li Yi-wen
9	DF	TPE	Chen Pin-yen
10	MF	JPN	Mizuka Sato
11	FW	TPE	Chen Jin-wen
12	DF	TPE	Wu Yu
13	FW	THA	Saowalak Peng-ngam

No.	Pos.	Nation	Player
14	MF	TPE	Maho Tanaka
15	FW	TPE	Chiang Tzu-shan
17	FW	TPE	Lin Jing-xuan
18	MF	TPE	Huang Hui-shan
19	MF	THA	Pitsamai Sornsai
20	MF	TPE	Chen Ying-hui (captain)
21	FW	TPE	Chang Yu-hsin
22	DF	TPE	Li Pei-jung
23	MF	PHI	Anicka Castañeda
25	GK	TPE	Wang Juo-ping
26	GK	THA	Chotmanee Thongmongkol
27	GK	TPE	Tsai Chia-yi

== Management ==
Position	Name
Head coach	(Spain) Josep Maria Roma Gibert
Assistant coach	(Taiwan) Cheng Ya-hsun
Assistant coach	(Hong Kong) Fan Ying Ying
Club director	(Taiwan) Lu Kuei-hua
Technical advisor	(Hong Kong) Chan Hiu Ming
Athletic trainer	(Taiwan) Chiu Yu-fang
Physical therapist	(Taiwan) Hong Chia-ling
Trainer	(Taiwan) Chiu Yu-hung
Coordinator	(Taiwan) Chen Chun-ju
Media	(Taiwan) Teng Kuang-chih

- Last updated: 28 September 2026

== Honours ==
Type	Competition	Titles	Seasons
Domestic	Taiwan Mulan Football League	5	2017, 2018, 2019, 2021, 2023
Domestic	Mulan League Cup	1	2021

== Records ==
=== Year-by-year ===
Season	League											Position	Finals	MLC	President FA Cup	Continental / Other		Top goalscorer(s)	
Season	Div	League	Pld	W	D	L	GF	GA	GD	Pts	PPG	Position	Finals	MLC	President FA Cup	Continental / Other		Name(s)	Goals
2014	1	TMFL	12	3	2	7	19	33	-14	11	0.92	4th	Not held	Not held	Not held	–		(Chinese Taipei) Lee Hsiu-chin	5
2015	1	TMFL	15	7	1	7	29	25	+4	22	1.47	2nd	Not held	Not held	Not held	–		(Chinese Taipei) Lee Hsiu-chin	8
2016	1	TMFL	12	5	4	3	18	13	+5	19	1.58	3rd	Not held	Not held	Not held	–		(Chinese Taipei) Lai Li-chin	6
2017	1	TMFL	15	10	4	1	38	10	+28	34	2.27	2nd	W	Not held	Not held	–		(Chinese Taipei) Lee Hsiu-chin	10
2018	1	TMFL	12	10	2	0	38	13	+25	32	2.67	1st	W	Not held	Not held	–		(Chinese Taipei) Lee Hsiu-chin	17
2019	1	TMFL	15	13	2	0	63	12	+51	41	2.73	1st	W	Not held	Not held	–		(Chinese Taipei) Lee Hsiu-chin	21
2020	1	TMFL	15	11	0	4	48	22	+26	33	2.20	2nd	Not held	RU	Not held	–		(Chinese Taipei) Pao Hsin-hsuan	22
2021	1	TMFL	10	7	2	1	22	3	+19	23	2.30	1st	Not held	Not held	Not held	–		(Chinese Taipei) Lai Li-chin (Japan) Maho Tanaka	5
2022	1	TMFL	15	7	5	3	39	17	+22	26	1.73	2nd	Not held	W	Not held	AFC Women's Club Championship	RU	(Chinese Taipei) Su Yu-hsuan	19
2023	1	TMFL	15	10	4	1	21	8	+13	34	2.27	1st	Not held	Not held	Not held	DNQ		(Japan) Maho Tanaka	4
2024	1	TMFL	15	9	3	3	28	15	+13	30	2.00	2nd	Not held	Not held	Not held	AFC Women's Champions League	QF	(Thailand) Saowalak Peng-ngam	9
2025–26	1	TMFL	21	15	3	3	54	17	+37	48	2.29	3rd	Not held	Not held	RU	AFC Women's Champions League	QF	(Thailand) Saowalak Peng-ngam	20
2026–27	1	TMFL											Not held	Not held	Not held	DNQ			
Total	–	–	172	107	32	33	417	188	+229	353	2.34	–	–	–	–	–		(Chinese Taipei) Lee Hsiu-chin	73

1. Top goalscorer(s) includes all goals scored in League, Finals, Mulan League Cup, Taiwan President FA Cup, AFC Women's Champions League, and other competitive continental matches.

=== International competition ===
Season	Competition	Round	Club	Aggregate
2022	AFC Women's Club Championship	Group stage	(Myanmar) ISPE	3–2
2022	AFC Women's Club Championship	Group stage	(Thailand) College of Asian Scholars	0–0
2024–25	AFC Women's Champions League	Group stage	(Vietnam) Hồ Chí Minh City	1–3
2024–25	AFC Women's Champions League	Group stage	(Japan) Urawa Red Diamonds	0–2
2024–25	AFC Women's Champions League	Group stage	(India) Odisha	4–0
2024–25	AFC Women's Champions League	Quarter-finals	(Australia) Melbourne City	0–3

=== Head coaches ===
Head coach	Nat.	Tenure
Lu Kuei-hua	Taiwan	2014–2016, 2018–2026
Hiroyuki Horino	Japan	2017
Josep Maria Roma Gibert	Spain	2026–

=== Captains ===
Name	Nat.	Years
Lee Hsiu-chin	Taiwan	2014–2015, 2019
Lai Li-chin	Taiwan	2016–2018
Lai Wei-ju	Taiwan	2020–2022
Tsai Ming-jung	Taiwan	2023–2026
Chen Ying-hui	Taiwan	2026–
