= Chen Yen-ping =

Taiwanese footballer (born 1991)

Personal information
- Date of birth: 20 August 1991 (age 35)
- Place of birth: Taoyuan City, Taiwan
- Height: 1.63 m (5 ft 4 in)
- Position: Midfielder

Team information
- Current team: Inter Taoyuan

Senior career*
Years	Team	Apps	(Gls)
2019	Hualien		
2020–	Inter Taoyuan		

International career^{‡}
2009	Chinese Taipei U19		(2)
2016–	Chinese Taipei	28	(10)
- * Club domestic league appearances and goals ‡ National team caps and goals as of 25 November 2022

Chen Yen-ping (Chinese: 陳燕萍; born 20 August 1991) is a Taiwanese footballer who plays as a midfielder for Taiwan Mulan Football League club Inter Taoyuan and the Chinese Taipei women's national team.

== International goals ==
No.	Date	Venue	Opponent	Score	Result	Competition
1.	8 November 2016	Hong Kong Football Club Stadium, Hong Kong	Hong Kong	5–0	5–0	2017 EAFF E-1 Football Championship
2.	1 March 2017	Umag City Stadium, Umag, Croatia	Slovenia	1–2	1–5	2017 Istria Cup
3.	8 November 2018	Hisor Central Stadium, Hisor, Tajikistan	Mongolia	7–0	9–0	2020 AFC Women's Olympic Qualifying Tournament
4.	8 November 2018	Hisor Central Stadium, Hisor, Tajikistan	Mongolia	8–0	9–0	2020 AFC Women's Olympic Qualifying Tournament
5.	9 April 2019	Grand Hamad Stadium, Doha, Qatar	Iran	2–0	4–1	2020 AFC Women's Olympic Qualifying Tournament
6.	1 December 2018	Guam Football Association National Training Center, Dededo, Guam	Hong Kong	2–0	2–0	2019 EAFF E-1 Football Championship
7.	24 March 2019	Tseung Kwan O Sports Ground, Hong Kong	Hong Kong	1–1	1–1	Friendly
8.	15 November 2019	Taipei Municipal Stadium, Taipei, Taiwan	Thailand	1–1	1–1	Friendly
9.	18 October 2021	Khalifa Sports City Stadium, Isa Town, Bahrain	Laos	1–0	4–0	2022 AFC Women's Asian Cup qualification
10.	24 October 2021	Khalifa Sports City Stadium, Isa Town, Bahrain	Bahrain	2–0	2–0	2022 AFC Women's Asian Cup qualification
11.	26 January 2022	DY Patil Stadium, Navi Mumbai, India	Iran	3–0	5–0	2022 AFC Women's Asian Cup
12.	23 February 2023	North Harbour Stadium, Auckland, New Zealand	Papua New Guinea	1–0	5–0	Friendly
