= Cheng Ssu-yu =

Taiwanese footballer (born 1989)

Personal information
- Date of birth: 25 September 1989 (age 37)
- Place of birth: Kaohsiung City, Taiwan
- Height: 1.72 m (5 ft 8 in)
- Position: Goalkeeper

Team information
- Current team: Okayama Yunogo Belle
- Number: 18

Senior career*
Years	Team	Apps	(Gls)
2014–2019	Taichung Blue Whale		
2020–2021	Okayama Yunogo Belle	10	(0)
2021–2022	JEF United Chiba	1	(0)
2022–	Okayama Yunogo Belle		

International career^{‡}
2013–	Chinese Taipei	10	(0)
- * Club domestic league appearances and goals as of 13 September 2023 ‡ National team caps and goals as of 10 February 2020

Cheng Ssu-yu (Chinese: 程思瑜; born 25 September 1989) is a Taiwanese footballer who plays as a goalkeeper for the Chinese Taipei women's national team.
