= Lai Li-chin =

Taiwanese footballer (born 1988)

Personal information
- Date of birth: 15 August 1988 (age 38)
- Place of birth: Hualien, Taiwan
- Height: 1.65 m (5 ft 5 in)
- Position: Forward

Team information
- Current team: Taichung Blue Whale
- Number: 11

Senior career*
Years	Team	Apps	(Gls)
- Taichung Blue Whale

International career^{‡}
2013–	Chinese Taipei	20	(16)
- * Club domestic league appearances and goals ‡ National team caps and goals as of 25 November 2022 (UTC)

Lai Li-chin (Chinese: 賴麗琴; born 15 August 1988) is a Taiwanese footballer who plays as a forward for Taiwan Mulan Football League club Taichung Blue Whale. She has been a member of the Chinese Taipei women's national team.

== International goals ==
No.	Date	Venue	Opponent	Score	Result	Competition
1.	28 March 2008	Thống Nhất Stadium, Hồ Chí Minh City, Vietnam	Iran	1–2	2–3	2008 AFC Women's Asian Cup qualification
2.	24 November 2012	Shenzhen Stadium, Shenzhen, China	Hong Kong	1–1	2–1	2013 EAFF Women's East Asian Cup
3.	24 November 2012	Shenzhen Stadium, Shenzhen, China	Hong Kong	2–1	2–1	2013 EAFF Women's East Asian Cup
4.	21 May 2013	Faisal Al-Husseini International Stadium, Al-Ram, Palestine	Palestine	3–0	6–0	2014 AFC Women's Asian Cup qualification
5.	23 May 2013	Faisal Al-Husseini International Stadium, Al-Ram, Palestine	India	2–1	2–1	2014 AFC Women's Asian Cup qualification
6.	15 November 2014	Hsinchu County Stadium, Zhubei, Taiwan	Guam	3–0	4–0	2015 EAFF Women's East Asian Cup
7.	11 November 2016	Hong Kong Football Club Stadium, Hong Kong	Guam	1–0	8–1	2017 EAFF E-1 Football Championship
8.	11 November 2016	Hong Kong Football Club Stadium, Hong Kong	Guam	5–1	8–1	2017 EAFF E-1 Football Championship
9.	10 June 2017	PAT Stadium, Bangkok, Thailand	Thailand	1–0	1–4	Friendly
10.	13 November 2018	Hisor Central Stadium, Hisor, Tajikistan	Philippines	1–0	5–0	2020 AFC Women's Olympic Qualifying Tournament
11.	18 October 2021	Khalifa Sports City Stadium, Isa Town, Bahrain	Laos	3–0	4–0	2022 AFC Women's Asian Cup qualification
12.	18 October 2021	Khalifa Sports City Stadium, Isa Town, Bahrain	Laos	4–0	4–0	2022 AFC Women's Asian Cup qualification
13.	24 October 2021	Khalifa Sports City Stadium, Isa Town, Bahrain	Bahrain	1–0	2–0	2022 AFC Women's Asian Cup qualification
14.	26 January 2022	DY Patil Stadium, Navi Mumbai, India	Iran	1–0	5–0	2022 AFC Women's Asian Cup
15.	26 January 2022	DY Patil Stadium, Navi Mumbai, India	Iran	2–0	5–0	2022 AFC Women's Asian Cup
16.	26 January 2022	DY Patil Stadium, Navi Mumbai, India	Iran	4–0	5–0	2022 AFC Women's Asian Cup
17.	19 February 2023	North Harbour Stadium, Auckland, New Zealand	Paraguay	1–0	2–2 (a.e.t.) (2–4 p)	2023 FIFA Women's World Cup qualification
18.	21 September 2023	Wenzhou Olympic Stadium, Wenzhou, China	India	1–1	2–1	2022 Asian Games
