= Tsai Ming-jung =

Taiwanese footballer

Personal information
- Date of birth: 23 January 1989 (age 37)
- Place of birth: New Taipei City, Taiwan
- Height: 1.68 m (5 ft 6 in)
- Position: Goalkeeper

Team information
- Current team: Taichung Blue Whale
- Number: 1

International career^{‡}
Years	Team	Apps	(Gls)
2009–	Chinese Taipei	17	(0)
- ‡ National team caps and goals as of 10 February 2020

Tsai Ming-jung (Chinese: 蔡明容; born 23 January 1989) is a Taiwanese footballer who plays as a goalkeeper for the Chinese Taipei women's national team.

== International career ==
Tsai Ming-jung represented Chinese Taipei at the 2007 AFC U-19 Women's Championship. She capped at senior level during the 2019 EAFF E-1 Football Championship and the 2020 AFC Women's Olympic Qualifying Tournament.
