= Chang Chi-lan =

Taiwanese footballer (born 1996)

Personal information
- Date of birth: 18 September 1996 (age 30)
- Place of birth: Kaohsiung City, Taiwan
- Height: 1.56 m (5 ft 1 in)
- Position: Midfielder

Team information
- Current team: Kaohsiung Attackers
- Number: 2

Senior career*
Years	Team	Apps	(Gls)
2014–2026	Taichung Blue Whale		
2026–	Kaohsiung Attackers		

International career^{‡}
2019–	Chinese Taipei	8	(0)
- * Club domestic league appearances and goals ‡ National team caps and goals as of 10 February 2020

Chang Chi-lan (Chinese: 張季蘭; born 18 September 1996) is a Taiwanese footballer who plays as a midfielder for Taiwan Mulan Football League club Kaohsiung Attackers and the Chinese Taipei women's national team.

== International goals ==
No.	Date	Venue	Opponent	Score	Result	Competition
1.	30 November 2023	Suoka Sports Training Base Pitch 1, Zhuhai, China	Macau	12–0	16–0	2024 EAFF E-1 Football Championship
2.	7 June 2026	GFA National Training Center, Dededo, Guam	Northern Mariana Islands	6–0	13–0	2028 EAFF E-1 Football Championship
3.	7 June 2026	GFA National Training Center, Dededo, Guam	Northern Mariana Islands	8–0	13–0	2028 EAFF E-1 Football Championship
4.	7 June 2026	GFA National Training Center, Dededo, Guam	Northern Mariana Islands	11–0	13–0	2028 EAFF E-1 Football Championship
