= Su Yu-hsuan =

Taiwanese footballer (born 2001)

Personal information
- Date of birth: 21 February 2001 (age 25)
- Place of birth: Changzhi, Pingtung, Taiwan
- Height: 1.61 m (5 ft 3 in)
- Position: Forward

Team information
- Current team: Taichung Blue Whale
- Number: 10

Senior career*
Years	Team	Apps	(Gls)
2019	Taichung Blue Whale		
2020–2021	Okayama Yunogo Belle	9	(0)
2021–	Taichung Blue Whale		

International career^{‡}
2016	Chinese Taipei U16	5	(7)
2018	Chinese Taipei U19	3	(4)
2018–	Chinese Taipei	8	(4)
- * Club domestic league appearances and goals ‡ National team caps and goals as of 25 November 2022

Su Yu-hsuan (Chinese: 蘇育萱; born 21 February 2001) is a Taiwanese footballer who plays as a forward for the Chinese Taipei women's national team.

== International goals ==
No.	Date	Venue	Opponent	Score	Result	Competition
1.	18 October 2021	Khalifa Sports City Stadium, Isa Town, Bahrain	Laos	2–0	4–0	2022 AFC Women's Asian Cup qualification
2.	4 February 2022	DY Patil Stadium, Navi Mumbai, India	Thailand	1–0	3–0	2022 AFC Women's Asian Cup
3.	4 February 2022	DY Patil Stadium, Navi Mumbai, India	Thailand	2–0	3–0	2022 AFC Women's Asian Cup
4.	6 February 2022	DY Patil Stadium, Navi Mumbai, India	Vietnam	1–1	1–2	2022 AFC Women's Asian Cup
5.	23 February 2023	North Harbour Stadium, Auckland, New Zealand	Papua New Guinea	3–0	5–0	Friendly
6.	31 May 2023	Bashundhara Kings Arena, Dhaka, Bangladesh	Bangladesh	1–0	4–0	Friendly
7.	31 May 2023	Bashundhara Kings Arena, Dhaka, Bangladesh	Bangladesh	3–0	4–0	Friendly
8.	31 May 2023	Bashundhara Kings Arena, Dhaka, Bangladesh	Bangladesh	4–0	4–0	Friendly
9.	3 June 2023	Bashundhara Kings Arena, Dhaka, Bangladesh	Bangladesh	1–0	1–0	Friendly
10.	21 September 2023	Wenzhou Olympic Sports Center Stadium, Wenzhou, China	India	2–1	2–1	2022 Asian Games
11.	30 September 2023	Linping Sports Center Stadium, Hangzhou, China	Uzbekistan	1–1	1–2 (a.e.t.)	2022 Asian Games
12.	30 November 2023	Suoka Sports Training Base Pitch 1, Zhuhai, China	Macau	3–0	16–0	2025 EAFF E-1 Football Championship - preliminary round
13.	30 November 2023	Suoka Sports Training Base Pitch 1, Zhuhai, China	Macau	13–0	16–0	2025 EAFF E-1 Football Championship - preliminary round
14.	30 November 2023	Suoka Sports Training Base Pitch 1, Zhuhai, China	Macau	14–0	16–0	2025 EAFF E-1 Football Championship - preliminary round
15.	29 June 2025	Indomilk Arena, Tangerang, Indonesia	Pakistan	3–0	8–0	2026 AFC Women's Asian Cup qualification
16.	2 July 2025	Indomilk Arena, Tangerang, Indonesia	Kyrgyzstan	2–0	3–0	2026 AFC Women's Asian Cup qualification
17.	5 July 2025	Indomilk Arena, Tangerang, Indonesia	Indonesia	1–0	2–1	2026 AFC Women's Asian Cup qualification
18.	13 July 2025	Hwaseong Stadium, Hwaseong, South Korea	China	1–2	2–4	2025 EAFF E-1 Football Championship
19.	7 March 2026	Perth Rectangular Stadium, Perth, Australia	Vietnam	1–0	1–0	2026 AFC Women's Asian Cup
20.	10 March 2026	Western Sydney Stadium, Sydney, Australia	India	1–0	3–1	2026 AFC Women's Asian Cup
21.	5 June 2026	GFA National Training Center, Dededo, Guam	Northern Mariana Islands	3–0	5–0	2028 EAFF E-1 Football Championship
22.	14 September 2026	Shizuoka Stadium, Fukuroi, Japan	Vietnam	1–0	2–1	2026 Asian Games
