= Hualien Stadium =

Stadium in Hualien City, Hualien County, Taiwan

- 花蓮縣立體育場
- Interactive map of Hualien Stadium
- Location: Hualien City, Hualien County, Taiwan
- Coordinates: 24°0′12.00″N 121°35′0.60″E
- Capacity: 12,800
- Type: stadium

Hualien Stadium (Chinese: 花蓮縣立體育場; pinyin: Huālián Xiànlì Tǐyùchǎng), also known as Te-hsing Stadium (Chinese: 德興體育場; pinyin: Déxìng Tǐyùchǎng), is a multi-use sport venue located in Hualien City, Hualien County, Taiwan. It is used mostly for association football and also sometimes for athletics.

== Notable events ==
- 38th Golden Horse Awards

== See also ==
- List of stadiums in Taiwan
- Sports in Taiwan
