= Lee Hsiu-chin =

Taiwanese footballer (born 1992)

Personal information
- Full name: Lee Hsiu-chin
- Date of birth: 18 August 1992 (age 34)
- Place of birth: Taitung City, Taiwan
- Height: 1.69 m (5 ft 7 in)
- Position: Midfielder

Team information
- Current team: Taichung Sakura

Senior career*
Years	Team	Apps	(Gls)
2014-2020	Taichung Blue Whale	80	(61)
2021-2023	Kaoshiung Sunny Bank	14	(9)
2024	New Taipei Hang Yuen	9	(4)
2025	Taichung Sakura	1	(1)

International career
2011	Chinese Taipei U19	1	(2)
2013–	Chinese Taipei	28	(16)
- * Club domestic league appearances and goals

Lee Hsiu-chin (Chinese: 李綉琴; born 18 August 1992) is a Taiwanese footballer who plays as a midfielder for Taiwan Mulan Football League club Taichung Sakura and the Chinese Taipei women's national team.

== International goals ==
No.	Date	Venue	Opponent	Score	Result	Competition
1.	6 March 2014	Umag Stadium, Umag, Croatia	Slovakia	1–1	5–4	2014 Istria Cup
2.	6 March 2014	Umag Stadium, Umag, Croatia	Slovakia	2–3	5–4	2014 Istria Cup
3.	6 March 2014	Umag Stadium, Umag, Croatia	Slovakia	3–3	5–4	2014 Istria Cup
4.	6 March 2014	Umag Stadium, Umag, Croatia	Slovakia	4–3	5–4	2014 Istria Cup
5.	20 March 2015	Taipei Municipal Stadium, Taipei, Taiwan	Laos	4–0	4–0	2016 AFC Women's Olympic Qualifying Tournament
6.	24 March 2015	Taipei Municipal Stadium, Taipei, Taiwan	Iran	1–0	1–0	2016 AFC Women's Olympic Qualifying Tournament
7.	22 September 2015	Mandalarthiri Stadium, Mandalay, Myanmar	Myanmar	1–3	1–3	2016 AFC Women's Olympic Qualifying Tournament
8.	8 November 2016	Hong Kong Football Club Stadium, Hong Kong	Hong Kong	4–0	5–0	2017 EAFF E-1 Football Championship
9.	11 November 2016	Hong Kong Football Club Stadium, Hong Kong	Guam	2–1	8–1	2017 EAFF E-1 Football Championship
10.	3 December 2018	Guam Football Association National Training Center, Dededo, Guam	Mongolia	1–0	6–0	2019 EAFF E-1 Football Championship
11.	3 December 2018	Guam Football Association National Training Center, Dededo, Guam	Mongolia	2–0	6–0	2019 EAFF E-1 Football Championship
12.	3 December 2018	Guam Football Association National Training Center, Dededo, Guam	Mongolia	3–0	6–0	2019 EAFF E-1 Football Championship
13.	3 December 2018	Guam Football Association National Training Center, Dededo, Guam	Mongolia	6–0	6–0	2019 EAFF E-1 Football Championship
14.	21 August 2018	Bumi Sriwijaya Stadium, Palembang, Indonesia	Maldives	6–0	7–0	2018 Asian Games
15.	6 November 2018	Hisor Stadium, Hisor, Tajikistan	Tajikistan	6–0	9–0	2020 AFC Women's Olympic Qualifying Tournament
16.	6 November 2018	Hisor Stadium, Hisor, Tajikistan	Tajikistan	7–0	9–0	2020 AFC Women's Olympic Qualifying Tournament
17.	8 November 2018	Hisor Stadium, Hisor, Tajikistan	Mongolia	3–0	9–0	2020 AFC Women's Olympic Qualifying Tournament
18.	13 November 2018	Hisor Stadium, Hisor, Tajikistan	Philippines	2–0	5–0	2020 AFC Women's Olympic Qualifying Tournament
19.	13 November 2018	Hisor Stadium, Hisor, Tajikistan	Philippines	4–0	5–0	2020 AFC Women's Olympic Qualifying Tournament
20.	23 February 2023	North Harbour Stadium, Auckland, New Zealand	Papua New Guinea	5–0	5–0	Friendly
