= Taipei Bravo PlayOne =

Taiwanese football club

- Full name: Taipei Bravo PlayOne
- Founded: 2017; 9 years ago
- Ground: Taipei Municipal Stadium
- Capacity: 20,000
- Manager: Oliver Harley
- League: Taiwan Mulan Football League
- 2024: TMFL, 4th
- Website: taipei.playone.com.tw
Home colours	Away colours

Taipei Bravo PlayOne (Chinese: 臺北熊讚女子足球隊) is a Taiwanese professional women's football club based in Taipei. Founded in 2017, it is associated with National Taiwan Normal University. The team currently competes in the country's top-tier women's domestic competition, the Taiwan Mulan Football League.

== Name history ==
- 2017 – 2018 : Taipei PlayOne
- 2019 – 2022 : Taipei Bravo
- 2023 – present : Taipei Bravo PlayOne

== Players ==
=== Current squad ===
As of 21 March 2026

Note: Flags indicate national team as defined under FIFA eligibility rules; some limited exceptions apply. Players may hold more than one non-FIFA nationality.

No.	Pos.	Nation	Player
2	MF	TPE	Huang Hsiang-Ling
3		TPE	Chen Yao-Ling
4	DF	TPE	Liu Wen-Ling
9	MF	TPE	Lin Man-Ting
12	FW	TPE	Song Yun-Hsuan
13		TPE	Liu Yu-Chi
16	DF	TPE	Wu Chih-Ying
17	DF	TPE	Hsieh Yi-Ling ( captain )
18	GK	TPE	Tsao Tze-Han
19	FW	TPE	Wang Yu-Ting

No.	Pos.	Nation	Player
20	GK	TPE	Tseng Min-hsien
22		TPE	Cheng Shiu-Chen
23	MF	TPE	Lin Ya-han
24	MF	TPE	Chang Yu-Chieh
27	DF	TPE	Wang Chia-Yu
30		TPE	Chen Tsing-Yi
31	DF	TPE	Liu Tzu-Chi
33	FW	TPE	Ku Mei-Er
37		TPE	Tsai Chi-Yu
