= Taiwan Mulan Football League =

- Organising body: Chinese Taipei Football Association
- Founded: 2014; 12 years ago
- Country: Taiwan
- Confederation: Asian Football Confederation
- Number of clubs: 8
- Level on pyramid: 1
- Relegation to: Taiwan President FA Cup
- Domestic cup: Taiwan President FA Cup
- International cup: AFC Women's Champions League
- Current champions: New Taipei Hang Yuan (2025–26)
- Most championships: Hualien; Taichung Blue Whale (5 titles)
- Top scorer: Lee Hsiu-chin (74 goals)
- Broadcaster(s): Sportcast
- Website: Official website
- Current: 2026–27 Taiwan Mulan Football League

The Taiwan Mulan Football League (TMFL; Chinese: 台灣木蘭足球聯賽) is the top-division women's association football league in Taiwan. Founded in 2014 and organized by the Chinese Taipei Football Association (CTFA), the TMFL replaced the Chinese Taipei women's football championship as the top-level women's league in the country.

== History ==
During the 2020 season, the league played through the COVID-19 pandemic , starting on April 11 and going until November 07.

== Competition format ==
The six teams in the league play each other three times. The games are played on Saturday. The regular season comes to an end when each team has played 15 games in total and it is followed by playoffs: the third and sixth placed, the fourth and fifth placed face each other in a one-leg quarter-final, with the winner facing the first placed team or the second placed team in a one-leg semi-final. Then the winners face each other in a one-leg final. The winner of the final is crowned Taiwan Mulan Football League champion.

== Teams ==
Teams (2026–27)
Team	Location	2025–26 rank	First season
Hualien	Hualien	4th	2014
Kaohsiung Attackers	Kaohsiung	2nd	2016
New Taipei Hang Yuan	New Taipei	1st	2017
Sunny Bank AC Taipei	Taipei	6th	2025–26
Taichung Blue Whale	Taichung	3rd	2014
Taichung Sakura	Taichung	5th	2025–26
Taipei Bravo PlayOne	Taipei	8th	2017
Valkyrie	Taipei	7th	2025–26

=== Former teams ===
- Taipei SCSC (2014-2016)
- Hsinchu (2014-2017)
- Inter Taoyuan (2018-2021)
- Mars (2022-2024)

=== Timeline ===
Current team Former team

== Stadiums ==
Stadiums (2026–27)
Stadium	Chinese	Location	Capacity	Map
Banqiao First Stadium	板橋第一運動場	New Taipei City	30,000	Taiwan Mulan Football League is located in Taiwan
Chiayi County Stadium	嘉義縣立田徑場	Chiayi County	30,000	Taiwan Mulan Football League is located in Taiwan
Fu Jen Catholic University Stadium	輔仁大學足球場	New Taipei City	3,000	Taiwan Mulan Football League is located in Taiwan
Hsinchu County Second Stadium	新竹縣立第二體育場	Hsinchu County	2,500	Taiwan Mulan Football League is located in Taiwan
Hualien Stadium	花蓮縣立田徑場	Hualien County	12,800	Taiwan Mulan Football League is located in Taiwan
Kaohsiung Nanzih Football Stadium	高雄市立楠梓足球場	Kaohsiung City	1,200	Taiwan Mulan Football League is located in Taiwan
Ming Chuan University Taoyuan Campus	銘傳大學龜山校區	Taoyuan City	5,000	Taiwan Mulan Football League is located in Taiwan
Taichung Football Sports and Leisure Park	台中南屯足球園區	Taichung City	6,000	Taiwan Mulan Football League is located in Taiwan
Taipei Municipal Stadium	臺北田徑場	Taipei City	20,000	Taiwan Mulan Football League is located in Taiwan
Taiyuan Football Field	太原足球場	Taichung City	600	Taiwan Mulan Football League is located in Taiwan
Xitun Football Field	西屯足球場	Taichung City	200	Taiwan Mulan Football League is located in Taiwan
Xizhi Sports Field	汐止綜合運動場	New Taipei City	466	Taiwan Mulan Football League is located in Taiwan

== Champions ==
Season	Regular season			Winner of the Finals
Season	First place	Second place	Third place	Winner of the Finals
2014	Hualien TLDC	Hsinchu	Taipei SCSC	Not held
2015	Hualien TLDC	Taichung Blue Whale	Hsinchu	Not held
2016	Hualien TLDC	Hsinchu F.C.	Taichung Blue Whale	Not held
2017	Taipei PlayOne	Taichung Blue Whale	Hualien	Taichung Blue Whale
2018	Taichung Blue Whale	Taipei PlayOne	Hualien	Taichung Blue Whale
2019	Taichung Blue Whale	Hualien	Taipei Bravo	Taichung Blue Whale
2020	Hualien	Taichung Blue Whale	Taipei Bravo	Not held
2021	Taichung Blue Whale	Hualien	Kaohsiung Sunny Bank	Not held
2022	Hualien	Taichung Blue Whale	Kaohsiung Sunny Bank	Not held
2023	Taichung Blue Whale	New Taipei Hang Yuan	Kaohsiung Sunny Bank	Not held
2024	Kaohsiung Attackers	Taichung Blue Whale	New Taipei Hang Yuan	Not held
2025–26	New Taipei Hang Yuan	Kaohsiung Attackers	Taichung Blue Whale	Not held

== See also ==
- AFC Women's Club Championship
- AFC Women's Champions League
- Football in Taiwan
