= Lu Kuei-hua =

Chinese football player and coach from Taiwan

Lu Kuei-hua (Chinese: 呂桂花; pinyin: Lǚ Guìhuā) is a Taiwanese football manager and former player. Lu is the first female head coach of Chinese Taipei women's national football team and associate professor of Department of Physical Education of National Taiwan College of Physical Education.

== Education ==
In 1994, Lu earned a master's degree from Kyoto University of Education.

== Career ==
In Taiwan, Lu has worked in the National Taiwan College of Physical Education and managed the school's women's football team.

In 1999, Lu was appointed assistant coach and, in 2003, became the first female head coach of the Chinese Taipei women's football team.
