= Taiyuan Football Field =

Football field in Beitun, Taichung, Taiwan

- 台中太原足球場
- Interactive map of Taiyuan Football Field
- Address: No. 6-8, Jianjun 1st Street, Beitun District, Taichung City 406, Taiwan
- Location: Taichung City, Taiwan
- Coordinates: 24°9′39″N 120°43′13″E
- Owner: Taichung City Government
- Operator: National Taiwan University of Sport
- Seating type: Retractable aluminum bleachers
- Capacity: 600
- Surface: Artificial turf
- Scoreboard: Blackboard
- Screen: None
- Record attendance: 600 (Taichung Blue Whale vs Hualien), 2019 Taiwan Mulan Football League, Finals
- Current use: Football training and matches
- Public transit: Taichung City Bus:81, 86, 86E, 246, 246E

Construction
- Built: 23 November 2017

Tenants
- Land Home NTUS (2018–2021); Taichung Blue Whale (2018–present); Taichung Futuro (2019–present); Taichung Sakura (2025–present); Taichung San Hai Tun NTUS (2026–present)

Taiyuan Football Field is an association football venue in Taichung, Taiwan. It is currently home to Taichung Blue Whale, Taichung Futuro, Taichung Sakura and Taichung San Hai Tun NTUS. The venue was built by Taichung City Government in 2017 and is operated by National Taiwan University of Sport.

On 9 November 2019, the Taichung Blue Whale played their first ever ticket-selling match against Hualien in the 2019 Taiwan Mulan Football League Finals. The match was sold out and was claimed that a total of 600 tickets were sold.
