= 2025–26 Taichung Blue Whale season =

Taichung Blue Whale
2025–26 season
- Head coach: Lu Kuei-hua
- Main ground: Taiyuan Football Field
- TMFL: 3rd
- AWCL: Quarter-finals
- President FA Cup: Runner-ups
- Top goalscorer: League: Saowalak Peng-ngam (17); All: Saowalak Peng-ngam (20)
- Highest home attendance: 190; Taichung Blue Whale 3–1 Kaohsiung Attackers (2 May 2026)
- Lowest home attendance: 36; Taichung Blue Whale 3–0 Valkyrie (27 September 2025)
- Average home league attendance: 97
- Biggest win: Taichung Sakura 0–6 Taichung Blue Whale; Taichung Blue Whale 6–0 Sunny Bank AC Taipei
- Biggest defeat: Melbourne City 3–0 Taichung Blue Whale
Home colours	Away colours

The 2025–26 Taichung Blue Whale season is the club's 12th season and their 12th season in Taiwan Mulan Football League. They also compete in the Taiwan President FA Cup and AFC Women's Champions League knockout stage.

== Kits ==
- Supplier: MIE Jersey
- Main Sponsor: Skechers

== Management team ==
Position	Name
Head coach	(Chinese Taipei) Lu Kuei-hua
Assistant coach	(Chinese Taipei) Cheng Ya-hsun
Assistant coach	(Japan) Yosuke Kyuta
Team manager	(Chinese Taipei) Chen Hua-wei
Athletic trainer	(Chinese Taipei) Chiu Yu-fang
Physical therapist	(Chinese Taipei) Hong Chia-ling
Trainer	(Chinese Taipei) Chiu Yu-hung
Coordinator	(Chinese Taipei) Chen Chun-ju
Media	(Chinese Taipei) Teng Kuang-chih

- Last updated: 26 May 2025

== Players ==
N	Pos.	Nat.	Name	Age.	Since
Goalkeepers
1	GK	(Chinese Taipei)	Tsai Ming-jung (captain)	36	2022
25	GK	(Chinese Taipei)	Wu Fang-yu	20	2024
26	GK	(Thailand)	Chotmanee Thongmongkol	27	2025
31	GK	(Chinese Taipei)	Lai Yi-chen	16	2025
Defenders
5	DF	(Chinese Taipei)	Wang Shih-han	21	2025
8	DF	(Hong Kong)	Sin Chung Yee	33	2025
9/27 (Note: Worn number 27 in President FA Cup.)	DF	(Chinese Taipei)	Pan Yu-chieh	19	2025
12	DF	(Chinese Taipei)	Wu Yu	27	2018
21/22 (Note: Worn number 22 in President FA Cup.)	DF	(Chinese Taipei)	Li Pei-jung	26	2019
22/30 (Note: Worn number 30 in President FA Cup.)	DF	(Chinese Taipei)	Tuan Yu-jou	29	2025
29	DF	(Chinese Taipei)	Chen Pin-yen	16	2025
Midfielders
2	MF	(Chinese Taipei)	Chang Chi-lan	29	2014
6/7 (Note: Worn number 6 in President FA Cup.)	MF	(Thailand)	Silawan Intamee	31	2022
10	MF	(Japan)	Mizuka Sato	27	2026
14	MF	(Japan)	Maho Tanaka	24	2019
15/16 (Note: Worn number 15 in President FA Cup.)	MF	(Chinese Taipei)	Lin Ya-hsuan	22	2024
18	MF	(Chinese Taipei)	Huang Hui-shan	17	2025
19	MF	(Thailand)	Pitsamai Sornsai	37	2021
20/21 (Note: Worn number 21 in President FA Cup.)	MF	(Chinese Taipei)	Chen Ying-hui	27	2025
23	MF	(Chinese Taipei)	Liu Chien-yun	33	2014
28	MF	(Chinese Taipei)	Wang Yu-hsin	16	2025
Forwards
11	FW	(Cameroon)	Tatiana Ewodo	29	2026
13	FW	(Thailand)	Saowalak Peng-ngam	29	2023
15/18 (Note: Worn number 18 in President FA Cup.)	FW	(Chinese Taipei)	Chiang Tzu-shan	23	2026
17	FW	(Chinese Taipei)	Lin Jing-xuan	20	2024

- Ordered by squad number.

== Transfers ==
=== In ===
No.	Pos.	Player	Transferred from	Source
Preseason (winter transfer)
9/27	DF	Pan Yu-chieh	(Chinese Taipei) New Taipei Senior High School	
20/21	MF	Chen Ying-hui	(Chinese Taipei) New Taipei Hang Yuan	
22/30	DF	Tuan Yu-jou	(Chinese Taipei) Kaohsiung Attackers	
Preseason (summer transfer)
5	DF	Wang Shih-han	(Chinese Taipei) National Taiwan University of Sport	
8	DF	Sin Chung Yee	(Hong Kong) United Citizen	
18	MF	Huang Hui-shan	(Chinese Taipei) Taichung Sakura	
26	GK	Chotmanee Thongmongkol	(Thailand) Bangkok	
28	MF	Wang Yu-hsin	(Chinese Taipei) Wu Chuan Junior High School	
29	DF	Chen Pin-yen	(Chinese Taipei) Wu Chuan Junior High School	
31	GK	Lai Yi-chen	(Chinese Taipei) Wu Chuan Junior High School	
Midseason
10	MF	Mizuka Sato	–	
11	FW	Tatiana Ewodo	(Israel) Hapoel Ra'anana	
15/18	FW	Chiang Tzu-shan	–	

=== Out ===
No.	Pos.	Player	Transferred to	Source
Preseason (winter transfer)
3	DF	Shen Yen-chun	(Chinese Taipei) Kaohsiung Attackers	
7	DF	Pan Shin-yu	(Chinese Taipei) Kaohsiung Attackers	
8	GK	Cheng Ssu-yu	(Chinese Taipei) Taichung Sakura	
21	MF	Huang Hui-shan	(Chinese Taipei) Taichung Sakura	
27	MF	Lee Yi-hsuan	(Chinese Taipei) Taichung Sakura	
28	FW	Lin Chia-ying	(Chinese Taipei) Taichung Sakura	
29	FW	Liao Jie-ning	(Japan) Yamagata Meisei High School	
30	MF	Wu Ya-yu	(Chinese Taipei) Taichung Sakura	
Preseason (summer transfer)
5	DF	Huang Ke-sin	(Chinese Taipei) Kaohsiung Attackers	
9	FW	Nien Ching-yun	–	
16	MF	Chen Jin-wen	(Chinese Taipei) Kaohsiung Attackers	
18	FW	Chiang Tzu-shan	–	
26	GK	Waraporn Boonsing	Retired	
Midseason
3/20	DF	Chen Tzu-chen	(Malaysia) Selangor	
24	MF	Lin Yu-syuan	(China) Shanxi Xihua	

== Preseason and friendlies ==
9 August 2025 Taiwan Women's City Club Football Invitational	Taichung Blue Whale (Chinese Taipei)	0–2	(Japan) Ryukyu Deigos	Taichung
19:00 (UTC+8)		Recap	Suzuki 6'; Utsugi 33'	Stadium: Taiyuan Football Field; Referee: Yang Chang-pei

10 August 2025 Taiwan Women's City Club Football Invitational	Taichung Blue Whale (Chinese Taipei)	7–0	(Thailand) Phranakorn	Taichung
19:00 (UTC+8)	Sornsai 19', 40+1'; Konfay 24' (o.g.); Chaimongkhol 44' (o.g.); Peng-ngam 70', 72'; Wang Yu-hsin 73'	Recap		Stadium: Taiyuan Football Field; Referee: Chen Hsin-shan

== Competitions ==
=== Overall record ===
Competition	First match	Last match	Starting round	Final position	Record							
Competition	First match	Last match	Starting round	Final position	Pld	W	D	L	GF	GA	GD	Win %
Taiwan Mulan Football League	16 August 2025	30 May 2026	Matchday 1	3rd	21	15	3	3	54	17	+37	71.43
Taiwan President FA Cup	20 April 2025	15 June 2025	Group stage	Runnersup	6	4	1	1	16	5	+11	66.67
AFC Women's Champions League	6 October 2024	23 March 2025	Group stage	Quarter-finals	1	0	0	1	0	3	−3	0.00
Total					28	19	4	5	70	25	+45	67.86

Source: TMFL President FA Cup AWCL

=== Taiwan Mulan Football League ===
==== League table ====
Pos	Team	Pld	W	D	L	GF	GA	GD	Pts	Qualification or relegation
1	New Taipei Hang Yuan (C)	21	17	3	1	71	10	+61	54	Qualification for the AFC Women's Champions League
2	Kaohsiung Attackers	21	16	4	1	65	11	+54	52	
3	Taichung Blue Whale	21	15	3	3	54	17	+37	48	
4	Hualien	21	8	3	10	26	31	−5	27	
5	Taichung Sakura	21	8	2	11	22	47	−25	26	
6	Sunny Bank AC Taipei	21	7	0	14	28	50	−22	21	
7	Valkyrie	21	2	1	18	11	61	−50	7 (Note: Ranked on overall goals scored: Valkyrie 11, Taipei Bravo PlayOne 8)	Required to play in 2026–27 Taiwan Mulan Football League qualifiers
8	Taipei Bravo PlayOne	21	1	4	16	8	58	−50	7	Required to play in 2026–27 Taiwan Mulan Football League qualifiers

(C) Champions

==== Results by round ====
Round	1	2	3	4	5	6	7	8	9	10	11	12	13	14	15	16	17	18	19	20	21
Result	W	W	W	W	W	W	L	D	W	D	W	W	W	W	L	W	W	L	W	W	W
Position	2	2	1	1	1	1	2	2	2	2	2	2	2	2	3	3	3	3	3	3	3

W = Win; D = Draw; L = Loss

==== Matches ====
16 August 2025 1	Hualien	0–1	Taichung Blue Whale	Hualien
18:30 (UTC+8)		Report	Lin Jing-xuan 45'	Stadium: Hualien Stadium; Attendance: 75; Referee: Yang Shu-ting

23 August 2025 2	Taichung Sakura	0–6	Taichung Blue Whale	Taichung
18:30 (UTC+8)		Report	Peng-ngam 32', 63', 70', 88'; Sornsai 36', 56'	Stadium: Xitun Football Field; Attendance: 75; Referee: Lin Te-en

13 September 2025 3	Taichung Blue Whale	1–0	Kaohsiung Attackers	Hsinchu County
15:30 (UTC+8)	Intamee 42'	Report		Stadium: Hsinchu County Second Stadium; Attendance: 72; Referee: Yang Shu-ting

20 September 2025 4	Taichung Blue Whale	2–0	Taipei Bravo PlayOne	Taichung
16:30 (UTC+8)	Peng-ngam 21'; Tseng Min-hsien 60' (o.g.); Lin Yu-syuan (yellow card) 90+1'	Report		Stadium: Taiyuan Football Field; Attendance: 98; Referee: Wang Chieh

27 September 2025 5	Taichung Blue Whale	3–0	Valkyrie	Taichung
15:30 (UTC+8)	Sornsai 27'; Lin Yu-syuan 39'; Li Pei-jung 85'	Report		Stadium: Xitun Football Field; Attendance: 36; Referee: Lin Chien

1 November 2025 6	Sunny Bank AC Taipei	2–3	Taichung Blue Whale	Taipei
18:00 (UTC+8)	Matsuyama 13', 16'	Report	Lin Jing-xuan 4'; Peng-ngam 24'; Intamee 64'	Stadium: Taipei Municipal Stadium; Attendance: 237; Referee: Chang Chih-chuan

8 November 2025 7	New Taipei Hang Yuan	3–1	Taichung Blue Whale	New Taipei
15:30 (UTC+8)	Tanaka 4' (yellow card) 71'; Miyamoto (yellow card) 40'; Pu Hsin-hui 51', 90+1'; Wang Yu-ting (yellow card) 73'	Report	Chen Ying-hui (yellow card) 45+2'; Sornsai 68'	Stadium: Fu Jen Catholic University; Attendance: 85; Referee: Kuo Chia-hao

15 November 2025 8	Taichung Blue Whale	1–1	Hualien	Taichung
15:30 (UTC+8)	Peng-ngam 75'	Report	Lee Chun-mei 58'	Stadium: Taiyuan Football Field; Attendance: 96; Referee: Chen Hsiao-en

6 December 2025 9	Taichung Blue Whale	3–1	Taichung Sakura	Taichung
15:30 (UTC+8)	Tanaka 21', 47'; Lin Yu-syuan (yellow card) 44'; Lin Ya-hsuan 70'	Report	Lai Li-chin 90+4'	Stadium: Taiyuan Football Field; Attendance: 146; Referee: Lee Yi-chi

13 December 2025 10	Kaohsiung Attackers	0–0	Taichung Blue Whale	Kaohsiung
18:00 (UTC+8)	Tsukamoto (yellow card) 56'	Report	Chang Chi-lan (yellow card) 11'	Stadium: Kaohsiung Nanzih Football Stadium; Attendance: 532; Referee: Kuo Po-hung

20 December 2025 11	Taipei Bravo PlayOne	0–2	Taichung Blue Whale	Hualien
15:00 (UTC+8)		Report	Chang Chi-lan 33'; Wu Chih-ying 44' (o.g.)	Stadium: Hualien Stadium; Attendance: 18; Referee: Lin Chien

24 January 2026 12	Taichung Blue Whale	2–2	New Taipei Hang Yuan	New Taipei
15:30 (UTC+8)	Peng-ngam 10'; Tanaka 73'	Report	Chen Yu-chin 63', 85'	Stadium: Fu Jen Catholic University; Attendance: 111; Referee: Lin Te-en

31 January 2026 13	Valkyrie	1–4	Taichung Blue Whale	Hualien
15:00 (UTC+8)	Cheng Yun-chi 89'	Report	Ewodo (yellow card) 14'; Tanaka 6', 68'; Peng-ngam 26'; Lin Jing-xuan 58'	Stadium: Hualien Stadium; Attendance: 22; Referee: Huang Chi-jui

7 February 2026 14	Taichung Blue Whale	2–1	Sunny Bank AC Taipei	Taipei
15:00 (UTC+8)	Tanaka 41'; Sornsai 65'	Report	Hsu Yi-yun 87'	Stadium: Taipei Municipal Stadium; Attendance: 85; Referee: Chen Chia-hao

28 March 2026 16	Taichung Blue Whale	4–0	Hualien	Taichung
16:00 (UTC+8)	Peng-ngam 41'; Ewodo 45+1'; Sato 50'; Tanaka 84'	Report		Stadium: Taiyuan Football Field; Attendance: 87; Referee: Chen Po-an

25 April 2026 17	Taichung Sakura	1–3	Taichung Blue Whale	Kaohsiung
15:00 (UTC+8)	Shen Tzu-yin 33'	Report	Peng-ngam 21', 70'; Tanaka 63'	Stadium: Kaohsiung Nanzih Football Stadium; Attendance: 42; Referee: Wang Chieh

2 May 2026 18	Taichung Blue Whale	1–2	Kaohsiung Attackers	Taichung
15:30 (UTC+8)	Sato 19'	Report	Hamamoto 47'; Chen Jin-wen 78'	Stadium: Xitun Football Field; Attendance: 190; Referee: Kuo Chia-hao

9 May 2026 19	Taipei Bravo PlayOne	2–6	Taichung Blue Whale	Taipei
18:30 (UTC+8)	Ku Mei-er 58'; Liu Wen-ling (yellow card) 59'; Lin Ya-han 66'	Report	Sato 7'; Peng-ngam 24', 79'; Sornsai 38'; Tanaka 64'; Intamee 78'	Stadium: Taipei Municipal Stadium; Attendance: 63; Referee: Kao Jung-fang

16 May 2026 20	Valkyrie	0–3	Taichung Blue Whale	Taichung
16:30 (UTC+8)		Report	Ewodo 24'; Peng-ngam 77'; Chen Pin-yen 78'	Stadium: Taiyuan Football Field; Attendance: 77; Referee: Lee Yi-chi

20 May 2026 15	Taichung Blue Whale	0–1	New Taipei Hang Yuan	Taichung
15:30 (UTC+8)	Chang Chi-lan (yellow card) 61'	Report	Miyamoto 90+6'	Stadium: Taiyuan Football Field; Attendance: 62; Referee: Lin Te-en

23 May 2026 21	Taichung Blue Whale	6–0	Sunny Bank AC Taipei	Taipei
18:30 (UTC+8)	Peng-ngam 16', 25'; Lin Jing-xuan 64', 90'; Chen Ying-hui 68'; Sato 90+1'			Stadium: Taipei Municipal Stadium; Attendance: 81; Referee: Kao Jung-fang

=== Taiwan President FA Cup ===
==== Group stage ====
Pos	Team	Pld	W	D	L	GF	GA	GD	Pts	Qualification
1	Taichung Blue Whale	4	4	0	0	15	3	+12	12	Advanced to Semifinals
2	New Taipei Hang Yuan	4	2	1	1	14	6	+8	7	Advanced to Semifinals
3	Taichung Sakura	4	1	2	1	8	5	+3	5	
4	Sunny Bank AC Taipei	4	1	1	2	7	12	−5	4	
5	Scientific City	4	0	0	4	2	20	−18	0	

20 April 2025 1	Taichung Blue Whale	4–0	New Taipei Hang Yuan	Taichung
16:00 (UTC+8)	Peng-ngam 11'; Lin Jing-xuan 13'; Chen Jin-wen 81'; Lin Yu-syuan 86'	Recap		Stadium: Taiyuan Football Field

27 April 2025 2	Sunny Bank AC Taipei	2–7	Taichung Blue Whale	Taichung
13:00 (UTC+8)	Yasuzawa 47'; Lee Yi-wen 82'	Recap	Peng-ngam 3', 51'; Liu Chien-yun 11'; Tanaka 38'; Wu Yu 46'; Chang Chi-lan 54'; Sornsai 64'	Stadium: Xitun Football Field

11 May 2025 3	Scientific City	0–2	Taichung Blue Whale	Taichung
16:00 (UTC+8)		Recap	Intamee 12'; Sornsai 17'	Stadium: Taiyuan Football Field

8 June 2025 4	Taichung Blue Whale	2–1	Taichung Sakura	Taichung
16:00 (UTC+8)	Sornsai 7' (pen.); Lin Jing-xuan 10'	Recap	Wu Ya-yu 18'	Stadium: Xitun Football Field

==== Knockout stage ====
13 June 2025 Semifinals	Taichung Blue Whale	1−1 (3–2 p)	Hsinchu Strikers	Kaohsiung
16:00 (UTC+8)	Liu Chien-yun 2'	Recap	Chuan Tzu-yu 76'	Stadium: Kaohsiung Nanzih Football Stadium; Referee: Kuo Chan-yu
	Penalties
	(penalty missed) Sornsai; (penalty scored) Peng-ngam; (penalty scored) Huang Ke-sin; (penalty scored) Lin Jing-xuan		Lin Hsiao-yun (penalty missed); Lee Chun-mei (penalty missed); Chen Ying-hsuan (penalty scored); Chuan Tzu-yu (penalty scored); Yang Hsiao-chuan (penalty missed)

15 June 2025 Final	Kaohsiung Attackers	1−0	Taichung Blue Whale	Kaohsiung
16:00 (UTC+8)	Wakabayashi 53'	Recap		Stadium: Kaohsiung Nanzih Football Stadium; Referee: Wang Chieh

=== AFC Women's Champions League ===
==== Knockout stage ====
23 March 2025 Quarter-finals	Melbourne City (Australia)	3–0	(Chinese Taipei) Taichung Blue Whale	Melbourne
15:00 (UTC+11)	Speckmaier 4'; Li Pei-jung 43' (o.g.); McNamara 63' (pen.)	Report		Stadium: Melbourne Rectangular Stadium; Referee: Kim Yu-jeong (South Korea)

== Statistics ==
=== Squad statistics ===
No.	Pos	Nat	Player	Total		TMFL		President FA Cup		AWCL	
No.	Pos	Nat	Player	Apps	Goals	Apps	Goals	Apps	Goals	Apps	Goals
Goalkeepers
1	GK	(Chinese Taipei) TPE	Tsai Ming-jung	13	0	8	0	3+1	0	1	0
25	GK	(Chinese Taipei) TPE	Wu Fang-yu	9	0	0+5	0	1+3	0	0	0
26	GK	(Thailand) THA	Chotmanee Thongmongkol	13	0	13	0	0	0	0	0
31	GK	(Chinese Taipei) TPE	Lai Yi-chen	0	0	0	0	0	0	0	0
Defenders
5	DF	(Chinese Taipei) TPE	Wang Shih-han	11	0	4+7	0	0	0	0	0
8	DF	(Hong Kong) HKG	Sin Chung Yee	9	0	9	0	0	0	0	0
9/27 (Note: Worn number 27 in President FA Cup.)	DF	(Chinese Taipei) TPE	Pan Yu-chieh	1	0	0	0	0	0	0+1	0
12	DF	(Chinese Taipei) TPE	Wu Yu	19	1	4+11	0	4	1	0	0
21/22 (Note: Worn number 22 in President FA Cup.)	DF	(Chinese Taipei) TPE	Li Pei-jung	21	1	14+3	1	3	0	1	0
22/30 (Note: Worn number 30 in President FA Cup.)	DF	(Chinese Taipei) TPE	Tuan Yu-jou	24	0	8+10	0	5+1	0	0	0
29	DF	(Chinese Taipei) TPE	Chen Pin-yen	3	1	0+3	1	0	0	0	0
Midfielders
2	MF	(Chinese Taipei) TPE	Chang Chi-lan	23	2	13+4	1	4+1	1	1	0
6/7 (Note: Worn number 6 in President FA Cup.)	MF	(Thailand) THA	Silawan Intamee	18	4	10+3	3	4	1	1	0
10	MF	(Japan) JPN	Mizuka Sato	9	4	8+1	4	0	0	0	0
14	MF	(Japan) JPN	Maho Tanaka	26	10	18+2	9	3+2	1	1	0
15/16 (Note: Worn number 15 in President FA Cup.)	MF	(Chinese Taipei) TPE	Lin Ya-hsuan	25	1	18	1	2+4	0	1	0
18	MF	(Chinese Taipei) TPE	Huang Hui-shan	9	0	2+7	0	0	0	0	0
19	MF	(Thailand) THA	Pitsamai Sornsai	25	9	17+1	6	5+1	3	1	0
20/21 (Note: Worn number 21 in President FA Cup.)	MF	(Chinese Taipei) TPE	Chen Ying-hui	26	1	21	1	4	0	1	0
23	MF	(Chinese Taipei) TPE	Liu Chien-yun	23	2	6+12	0	3+1	2	0+1	0
28	MF	(Chinese Taipei) TPE	Wang Yu-hsin	3	0	1+2	0	0	0	0	0
Forwards
11	FW	(Cameroon) CMR	Tatiana Ewodo	9	2	7+2	2	0	0	0	0
13	FW	(Thailand) THA	Saowalak Peng-ngam	23	20	15+3	17	3+1	3	1	0
15/18 (Note: Worn number 18 in President FA Cup.)	FW	(Chinese Taipei) TPE	Chiang Tzu-shan	12	0	3+3	0	3+3	0	0	0
17	FW	(Chinese Taipei) TPE	Lin Jing-xuan	25	7	16+2	5	5+1	2	0+1	0
Players who left during the season but made an appearance
3/20 (Note: Worn number 20 in President FA Cup.)	DF	(Chinese Taipei) TPE	Chen Tzu-chen	12	0	3+4	0	2+3	0	0	0
5	DF	(Chinese Taipei) TPE	Huang Ke-sin	6	0	0	0	4+1	0	1	0
9	FW	(Chinese Taipei) TPE	Nien Ching-yun	2	0	0	0	1	0	0+1	0
16	MF	(Chinese Taipei) TPE	Chen Jin-wen	5	1	0	0	2+2	1	1	0
24	MF	(Chinese Taipei) TPE	Lin Yu-syuan	19	2	13	1	3+2	1	0+1	0
26	GK	(Thailand) THA	Waraporn Boonsing	2	0	0	0	2	0	0	0
Own goals (1)

=== Goalscorers ===
Rank	No.	Pos.	Nat.	Player	TMFL	President FA Cup	AWCL	Total
1	13	FW	(Thailand)	Saowalak Peng-ngam	17	3	0	20
2	14	MF	(Japan)	Maho Tanaka	9	1	0	10
3	19	MF	(Thailand)	Pitsamai Sornsai	6	3	0	9
4	17	FW	(Chinese Taipei)	Lin Jing-xuan	5	2	0	7
5	6/7 (Note: Worn number 6 in President FA Cup.)	MF	(Thailand)	Silawan Intamee	3	1	0	4
5	10	MF	(Japan)	Mizuka Sato	4	—	—	4
7	2	MF	(Chinese Taipei)	Chang Chi-lan	1	1	0	2
7	11	FW	(Cameroon)	Tatiana Ewodo	2	—	—	2
7	23	MF	(Chinese Taipei)	Liu Chien-yun	0	2	0	2
7	24	MF	(Chinese Taipei)	Lin Yu-syuan	1	1	0	2
11	12	DF	(Chinese Taipei)	Wu Yu	0	1	0	1
11	15/16 (Note: Worn number 15 in President FA Cup.)	MF	(Chinese Taipei)	Lin Ya-hsuan	1	0	0	1
11	16	MF	(Chinese Taipei)	Chen Jin-wen	—	1	0	1
11	20/21 (Note: Worn number 21 in President FA Cup.)	DF	(Chinese Taipei)	Chen Ying-hui	1	0	0	1
11	21/22 (Note: Worn number 22 in President FA Cup.)	DF	(Chinese Taipei)	Li Pei-jung	1	0	0	1
11	29	DF	(Chinese Taipei)	Chen Pin-yen	1	—	—	1
Own goals (from the opponents)					2	0	0	2
Totals					54	16	0	70

=== Hat-tricks ===
Player	Against	Result	Date	Competition	Ref
(Thailand) Saowalak Peng-ngam^{4}	Taichung Sakura	6–0	23 August 2025	Taiwan Mulan Football League	

^{4} – Player scored four goals.

=== Cleansheets ===
Rank	No.	Nat.	Player	TMFL	President FA Cup	AWCL	Total
1	26	(Thailand)	Chotmanee Thongmongkol	6	—	—	6
2	1	(Chinese Taipei)	Tsai Ming-jung	4	0	0	4
2	25	(Chinese Taipei)	Wu Fang-yu	3	1	—	4
4	26	(Thailand)	Waraporn Boonsing	—	2	—	2
5	31	(Chinese Taipei)	Lai Yi-chen	—	—	—	0
Totals				13	3	0	16

== Awards ==
=== Annual Awards CTFA ===
Player	Position	Award	Ref.
(Thailand) Saowalak Pengngam	Forward	Golden Boot	

=== FA Thailand Awards ===
Player	Position	Award	Ref.
(Thailand) Saowalak Pengngam	Forward	Women's Player of the Year	
