= 2025 Taiwan President FA Cup =

Tournament details
- Country: Taiwan
- Venues: 10
- Dates: Men: 12 April – 31 May; Women: 20 April – 15 June
- Teams: Men: 20; Women: 10

Final positions
- Champions: Men: Tainan City TSG Blue; Women: Kaohsiung Attackers
- Runners-up: Men: Taipower; Women: Taichung Blue Whale
- ACGL: Tainan City TSG Blue
- League 2: New Taipei FJCU; Taichung Rock B Wan Island
- TMFL: Hualien; Sunny Bank AC Taipei; Taichung Sakura; Valkyrie

Tournament statistics
- Matches played: Men: 47; Women: 23
- Top goal scorer(s): Men: Kao Kuan-yu; Matheus Porto (7 goals); Women: Ho Chia-hsuan; Lee Yi-wen (6 goals)

Awards
- Best player: Men: Chen Chao-an; Women: Minori Wakabayashi
- Best goalkeeper: Men: Huang Chiu-lin; Women: Yoshimi Miki

The 2025 Taiwan President FA Cup is the first edition of the Taiwan President FA Cup, organized by the Chinese Taipei Football Association. The tournament also serves as qualification to non-league teams for the 2025–26 Taiwan Football League 2 and the 2025–26 Taiwan Mulan Football League.

== Teams ==
A total of 30 teams, including 20 men's and 10 women's teams have participated in this tournament.

=== Men ===
| Premier League | League 2 | Non-league teams |
|---|---|---|
| Leopard Cat (Taoyuan, Taiwan) Ming Chuan A (New Taipei City) New Taipei Hang Yuan; Sunny Bank AC Taipei; Taichung Futuro; Taichung Rock; Tainan City TSG Blue (Kaohsiung) Taipower | (Taoyuan, Taiwan) Inter Taoyuan Red (Taoyuan, Taiwan) Ming Chuan B (Kaohsiung) NUK Kuo Kuang; Sunny Bank AC Taipei Reserves | (Changhua County) Babuza (Hsinchu County) Hsinchu Xinyi Cosmos United; Inter Taipei (Taoyuan, Taiwan) Inter Taoyuan Grey (New Taipei City) New Taipei FJCU; Taichung Rock B Tainan City TSG Green; Wan Island |

=== Women ===
| Mulan League | Non-league teams |
|---|---|
| (Hualien County) Hualien; Kaohsiung Attackers (New Taipei City) New Taipei Hang Yuan; Taichung Blue Whale; Taipei Bravo PlayOne | (Hsinchu County) Hsinchu Strikers; Science City; Sunny Bank AC Taipei; Taichung Sakura; Valkyrie |

== Venues ==
| Venue | Location | Capacity | Map |
|---|---|---|---|
| Fu Jen Catholic University | New Taipei City | 3,000 | 2025 Taiwan President FA Cup is located in Taiwan |
| Hsinchu County Second Stadium | Hsinchu County | 2,500 | 2025 Taiwan President FA Cup is located in Taiwan |
| Hualien Stadium | Hualien County | 12,800 | 2025 Taiwan President FA Cup is located in Taiwan |
| Kaohsiung Nanzih Football Stadium | Kaohsiung City | 1,200 | 2025 Taiwan President FA Cup is located in Taiwan |
| Ming Chuan University | Taoyuan City | 5,000 | 2025 Taiwan President FA Cup is located in Taiwan |
| National Taiwan Sport University | Taoyuan City | 3,000 | 2025 Taiwan President FA Cup is located in Taiwan |
| National University of Kaohsiung | Kaohsiung City | | 2025 Taiwan President FA Cup is located in Taiwan |
| Tainan Municipal Football Field | Tainan City | 2,000 | 2025 Taiwan President FA Cup is located in Taiwan |
| Taiyuan Football Field | Taichung City | 600 | 2025 Taiwan President FA Cup is located in Taiwan |
| Xitun Football Field | Taichung City | 200 | 2025 Taiwan President FA Cup is located in Taiwan |

== Men's tournament ==
The winner qualified to the preliminary round of the 2025–26 AFC Challenge League.

=== Group stage ===
==== Group A ====
| Pos | Team | Pld | W | D | L | GF | GA | GD | Pts | Qualification |
|---|---|---|---|---|---|---|---|---|---|---|
| 1 | Tainan City TSG Blue | 4 | 4 | 0 | 0 | 19 | 4 | +15 | 12 | Advanced to Quarterfinals |
| 2 | Taichung Rock | 4 | 2 | 1 | 1 | 8 | 10 | −2 | 7 | Advanced to Quarterfinals |
| 3 | Sunny Bank AC Taipei Reserves | 4 | 1 | 1 | 2 | 11 | 10 | +1 | 4 | |
| 4 | New Taipei FJCU | 4 | 1 | 1 | 2 | 7 | 12 | −5 | 4 | |
| 5 | NUK Kuo Kuang | 4 | 0 | 1 | 3 | 6 | 15 | −9 | 1 | |

| 12 April 2025 1 | Tainan City TSG Blue | 3−1 | Sunny Bank AC Taipei Reserves | Tainan |
| 18:30 (UTC+8) | Chen Jui-chieh 5'; Lin Wei-chieh 18'; Benchy 59'; Kim Sang-jun (yellow card) 81'; Jatta (yellow card) 90+1' | Recap | Chang Che-ming (yellow card) 1'; Arreaga 15'; Wu Chia-wei (yellow card) 74'; Tsai Meng-kuang (yellow card) 81'; Takayama (yellow card) 84' | Stadium: Tainan Municipal Football Field |

| 12 April 2025 2 | Taichung Rock | 2−1 | New Taipei FJCU | Taichung |
| 19:30 (UTC+8) | Liao Yi-sheng (yellow card) 23'; Chen Po-wei 36'; Shih Jing-tang 45+1'; Tsai Yu-hsiang (yellow card) 88'; Tai Yan-yao (yellow card) 90+5' | Recap | Chen Yu-hsun (yellow card) 54'; Wang Hao-lin (yellow card) 78'; Pan Yen-hung 90+3'; Chang Wen-hsiang (yellow card) 90+3' | Stadium: Xitun Football Field; Referee: Liu Hsiang-shao |

| 19 April 2025 4 | New Taipei FJCU | 2−2 | Sunny Bank AC Taipei Reserves | New Taipei |
| 10:00 (UTC+8) | Finotti (yellow card) 53'; Lin Tsung-hung 75'; Huang Kai-chun 90+5' | Recap | Takayama 8' (pen.); Lee Jeong-cheol 49'; Arreaga (yellow card) 90+4' | Stadium: Fu Jen Catholic University |

| 26 April 2025 5 | Sunny Bank AC Taipei Reserves | 2−3 | Taichung Rock | Kaohsiung |
| 13:00 (UTC+8) | Chen Yu-heng 27', 43' | Recap | Cheng Kai-yi 31'; Liao Yi-sheng (yellow card) 45'; Shih Jing-tang 58' (pen.) (yellow card) 87'; Chen Chih-wei 64'; Lin Chia-le (yellow card) 68' (yellow-red card) 82' | Stadium: National University of Kaohsiung |

| 26 April 2025 6 | New Taipei FJCU | 3−1 | NUK Kuo Kuang | Kaohsiung |
| 16:00 (UTC+8) | Chen Yu-hsun 4'; Tseng Tzu-le 67'; Huang Kai-chun 90+4' | Recap | Huang Ching-chun (yellow card) 27'; Kuo Yi-feng 48'; Hsiung Shih-wei (yellow card) 90+4' | Stadium: National University of Kaohsiung |

| 30 April 2025 3 | NUK Kuo Kuang | 1−4 | Tainan City TSG Blue | Tainan |
| 15:00 (UTC+8) | Chuang Chia-wei (yellow card) 21'; Kuo Yi-feng 86' | Recap | Yao Ko-chi 30'; Benchy 46', 90+3'; Jatta 50' | Stadium: Tainan Municipal Football Field |

| 3 May 2025 8 | NUK Kuo Kuang | 2−6 | Sunny Bank AC Taipei Reserves | Kaohsiung |
| 15:00 (UTC+8) | Hsiung Shih-wei (yellow card) 7'; Lee Chih-han (yellow card) 10'; Wang Cheng-hsiang 37'; Huang Chao-chung 39' | Recap | Chang Chen-jui 18'; Hsu Juo-chen (yellow card) 50'; Arreaga 53' (yellow card) 90+2'; Lee Shih-ying 63'; Takayama 72'; Liu Chi-chao 82', 90+5' | Stadium: National University of Kaohsiung |

| 4 May 2025 7 | Taichung Rock | 1−5 | Tainan City TSG Blue | Taichung |
| 18:00 (UTC+8) | Chou Yu-chieh 51' | Recap | Yao Ko-chi 2'; Chen Po-ying 4' (o.g.); Liao Yi-sheng 8' (o.g.); Jatta 59'; Chen Jui-chieh 63'; Sakkouh (yellow card) 65' | Stadium: Xitun Football Field; Referee: Liu Hsiang-shao |

| 10 May 2025 9 | Tainan City TSG Blue | 7−1 | New Taipei FJCU | Tainan |
| 16:00 (UTC+8) | Chen Jui-chieh 12'; Dai Ya-cheng 59'; Jatta 64', 71'; Yu Chia-huang 64'; Yao Ko-chi 75', 89' | Recap | Tseng Tzu-le 77' | Stadium: Tainan Municipal Football Field |

| 11 May 2025 10 | Taichung Rock | 2−2 | NUK Kuo Kuang | Taichung |
| 18:00 (UTC+8) | Shih Jing-tang 80', 90+3' | Recap | Chen Pen-hsiu (yellow card) 27'; Wang Cheng-hsiang (yellow card) 43'; Wu Yu-hua (yellow card) 63'; Yang Tsung-yi (yellow card) 70'; Huang Chih-hao 85'; Huang Chao-chung 90+4' | Stadium: Xitun Football Field |

==== Group B ====
| Pos | Team | Pld | W | D | L | GF | GA | GD | Pts | Qualification |
|---|---|---|---|---|---|---|---|---|---|---|
| 1 | Taichung Futuro | 4 | 4 | 0 | 0 | 15 | 2 | +13 | 12 | Advanced to Quarterfinals |
| 2 | Tainan City TSG Green | 4 | 3 | 0 | 1 | 18 | 5 | +13 | 9 | Advanced to Quarterfinals |
| 3 | Taichung Rock B | 4 | 2 | 0 | 2 | 17 | 8 | +9 | 6 | |
| 4 | Ming Chuan B | 4 | 0 | 1 | 3 | 2 | 15 | −13 | 1 | |
| 5 | Inter Taoyuan Grey | 4 | 0 | 1 | 3 | 0 | 22 | −22 | 1 | |

| 12 April 2025 11 | Taichung Futuro | 7−0 | Inter Taoyuan Grey | Tainan |
| 16:00 (UTC+8) | Lai Yi-chiao 3', 65', 73'; Li Mao 47', 76', 81'; Cheng Hao 51' | Recap | | Stadium: Tainan Municipal Football Field |

| 12 April 2025 12 | Taichung Rock B | 1−5 | Tainan City TSG Green | Taichung |
| 16:30 (UTC+8) | Kao Kuan-yu 84' | Recap | Porto 5', 37'; Liu Chien-wei (yellow card) 45+1'; Lin Chun-kai 65'; Gamaroni 67', 74'; Tsai Shuo-che (yellow card) 82' | Stadium: Xitun Football Field; Referee: Yang Chang-pei |

| 19 April 2025 14 | Tainan City TSG Green | 8−0 | Inter Taoyuan Grey | Tainan |
| 13:00 (UTC+8) | Porto 11', 32', 44'; 15' (o.g.); Gamaroni 38'; Koli 60' (pen.); Kunimoto 74'; Chang Ting-an 85' | Recap | Yang Yung-cheng (yellow card) 43' | Stadium: Tainan Municipal Football Field |

| 19 April 2025 13 | Ming Chuan B | 1−2 | Taichung Futuro | Taoyuan |
| 18:00 (UTC+8) | Hsiao Yueh-hui 41'; Chang Yi-hsien (yellow card) 53' | Recap | Li Mao 45+1', 59' | Stadium: Ming Chuan University |

| 26 April 2025 15 | Inter Taoyuan Grey | 0−7 | Taichung Rock B | Tainan |
| 16:00 (UTC+8) | | Recap | Kao Kuan-yu 31', 40', 49', 70'; Lee Wei-lun 34'; Tsai Chun-sheng 53'; Hsu Liu Chien-feng 72' | Stadium: Tainan Municipal Football Field |

| 26 April 2025 16 | Tainan City TSG Green | 5−0 | Ming Chuan B | Tainan |
| 18:30 (UTC+8) | Chen Po-yu 8'; Lin Ming-wei 26'; Tsai Cheng-ju 33'; Liu Chien-wei 43'; Lin Chun-kai 45+1' | Recap | | Stadium: Tainan Municipal Football Field |

| 3 May 2025 18 | Ming Chuan B | 0−0 | Inter Taoyuan Grey | Taoyuan |
| 16:00 (UTC+8) | | Recap | | Stadium: Ming Chuan University |

| 4 May 2025 17 | Taichung Rock B | 1−2 | Taichung Futuro | Taichung |
| 15:00 (UTC+8) | Hsu Liu Chien-feng (yellow card) 37'; Wang Yi-you (yellow card) 47'; Chiang Chun-yao 83' | Recap | Takayama 20' (pen.); Wen Chih-hao 89' | Stadium: Xitun Football Field |

| 10 May 2025 19 | Taichung Futuro | 4−0 | Tainan City TSG Green | Taichung |
| 19:00 (UTC+8) | Hsu Heng-pin 17', 55', 63', 74' | Recap | | Stadium: Xitun Football Field |

| 11 May 2025 20 | Taichung Rock B | 8−1 | Ming Chuan B | Taichung |
| 15:00 (UTC+8) | Chou Yu-hao 59'; Tsai Chun-sheng 66'; Ko Yueh-ting 67'; Kung Chih-yu 69'; Kao Kuan-yu 74', 81'; Ku Chieh-an 79'; Lee Wei-lun 82' | Recap | Chang Yi-hsien (yellow card) 3'; Hsiung Yuan-kuan (yellow card) 29'; Cheng Yu-che 39'; Chang Che-wei (yellow card) 52'; Yu You-yi (yellow card) 81' | Stadium: Xitun Football Field |

==== Group C ====
| Pos | Team | Pld | W | D | L | GF | GA | GD | Pts | Qualification |
|---|---|---|---|---|---|---|---|---|---|---|
| 1 | Taipower | 4 | 3 | 1 | 0 | 18 | 1 | +17 | 10 | Advanced to Quarterfinals |
| 2 | New Taipei Hang Yuan | 4 | 2 | 2 | 0 | 10 | 3 | +7 | 8 | Advanced to Quarterfinals |
| 3 | Hsinchu Xinyi Cosmos United | 4 | 2 | 0 | 2 | 7 | 18 | −11 | 6 | |
| 4 | Inter Taoyuan Red | 4 | 1 | 0 | 3 | 6 | 12 | −6 | 3 | |
| 5 | Inter Taipei | 4 | 0 | 1 | 3 | 2 | 9 | −7 | 1 | |

| 13 April 2025 22 | Taipower | 3−0 | Inter Taipei | Taoyuan |
| 14:00 (UTC+8) | 28' (o.g.); Chen Chao-an 32'; Lai Chih-hsuan (yellow card) 36'; Lai Wei 84' | Recap | Tu Jung-tsuo (yellow card) 33' | Stadium: Ming Chuan University |

| 13 April 2025 21 | New Taipei Hang Yuan | 2−1 | Inter Taoyuan Red | Taoyuan |
| 16:30 (UTC+8) | Kaneko (yellow card) 37'; Tateiwa 79' (pen.); Koreeda 90+5' | Recap | Lin Hai-cheng (yellow card) 45+2' (goal) 65'; Lu Cheng-en (yellow card) 70'; Tseng Yi-hsiang (yellow card) 75'; Meftah (yellow card) 88' | Stadium: Ming Chuan University |

| 20 April 2025 23 | Hsinchu Xinyi Cosmos United | 1−7 | New Taipei Hang Yuan | Hsinchu County |
| 10:00 (UTC+8) | Liu Ping-en 60' (pen.) | RecapRecap | Chen Pao-chun 10', 69'; Kaneko 14' (pen.); 21'; Tateiwa 24'; 28'; Koreeda 66' | Stadium: Hsinchu County Second Stadium |

| 20 April 2025 24 | Inter Taipei | 1−3 | Inter Taoyuan Red | Taoyuan |
| 14:00 (UTC+8) | 84' | Recap | Lu Cheng-en 15'; Lin Wei 23'; Lin Hai-cheng 55' | Stadium: Ming Chuan University |

| 27 April 2025 25 | Inter Taoyuan Red | 0−6 | Taipower | New Taipei |
| 14:00 (UTC+8) | Liu Kai-jui (yellow card) 15' (yellow-red card) 62'; Rabre (yellow card) 61' | Recap | Yeh Ching-chun 12', 55'; Lai Wei 18', 39' (yellow card) 83'; Chen Po-hsun 42'; Hsu Po-chieh (yellow card) 45+1'; Huang Yi-han 89' | Stadium: Fu Jen Catholic University |

| 27 April 2025 26 | Inter Taipei | 1−3 | Hsinchu Xinyi Cosmos United | Taoyuan |
| 14:00 (UTC+8) | Tu Jung-tsuo (yellow card) 28'; 60' | Recap | Tai Hsu-en (yellow card) 17'; Hsu Shan-chieh 34'; Liu Ping-en 56'; Kuo Ting-yao 90+4' | Stadium: Ming Chuan University |

| 4 May 2025 27 | Taipower | 1−1 | New Taipei Hang Yuan | Kaohsiung |
| 13:00 (UTC+8) | Yang Chen-ying 90+3' (pen.) | Recap | Tateiwa 59' | Stadium: National University of Kaohsiung |

| 4 May 2025 28 | Hsinchu Xinyi Cosmos United | 3−2 | Inter Taoyuan Red | Kaohsiung |
| 16:00 (UTC+8) | Chen Wei-hsuan 3'; Liu Yi-chen 86'; Liao Chien-hsiung 88' (yellow card) 88' | Recap | Chang Che-wei 21' (yellow card) 80'; Lin Wei 58' | Stadium: National University of Kaohsiung |

| 11 May 2025 30 | Taipower | 8−0 | Hsinchu Xinyi Cosmos United | Kaohsiung |
| 13:00 (UTC+8) | Lai Wei 2'; Hsu Po-chieh 6'; Tu Shao-chieh 19'; Yeh Ching-chun 47', 56'; Yang Chen-ying 48'; Hung Yung-chun (yellow card) 59'; Chen Chao-an 61'; Huang Yi-han 80' | Recap | Liu Ping-en (yellow card) 42' | Stadium: National University of Kaohsiung |

| 11 May 2025 29 | New Taipei Hang Yuan | 0−0 | Inter Taipei | Taoyuan |
| 14:00 (UTC+8) | | Recap | Gallardo (yellow card) 88' | Stadium: Ming Chuan University |

==== Group D ====
| Pos | Team | Pld | W | D | L | GF | GA | GD | Pts | Qualification |
|---|---|---|---|---|---|---|---|---|---|---|
| 1 | Leopard Cat | 4 | 3 | 1 | 0 | 18 | 0 | +18 | 10 | Advanced to Quarterfinals |
| 2 | Sunny Bank AC Taipei | 4 | 3 | 1 | 0 | 18 | 1 | +17 | 10 | Advanced to Quarterfinals |
| 3 | Ming Chuan A | 4 | 2 | 0 | 2 | 9 | 6 | +3 | 6 | |
| 4 | Wan Island | 4 | 0 | 1 | 3 | 2 | 18 | −16 | 1 | |
| 5 | Babuza | 4 | 0 | 1 | 3 | 1 | 23 | −22 | 1 | |

| 13 April 2025 32 | Wan Island | 1−1 | Babuza | Taoyuan |
| 10:00 (UTC+8) | Chiang Yu-hsun 90+3'; Chang Yu-jui (yellow card) 90+4' | Recap | Lin Chih-sen 22'; Liu Yu-hao (yellow card) 28'; Noyon (yellow card) 76' | Stadium: National Taiwan Sport University |

| 13 April 2025 31 | Sunny Bank AC Taipei | 0−0 | Leopard Cat | Taoyuan |
| 19:00 (UTC+8) | Lee Shih-yu (yellow card) 5'; Uchida (yellow card) 52' | Recap | Izumi (yellow card) 25'; Fukasawa (yellow card) 73'; Chen Yao-ming (yellow card) 83' | Stadium: Ming Chuan University |

| 20 April 2025 34 | Babuza | 0−7 | Leopard Cat | Taoyuan |
| 16:30 (UTC+8) | | Recap | Izumi 15' (pen.); Chen Yao-ming 20'; Chen Po-hao 33', 38'; Chen Shih-hsien 66'; Lan Hao-yu 67'; Lin Chih-hsuan 70' | Stadium: Ming Chuan University |

| 20 April 2025 33 | Ming Chuan A | 1−3 | Sunny Bank AC Taipei | Taoyuan |
| 19:00 (UTC+8) | Ng Pui-hei 43' (yellow card) 69'; Wang Sheng-han (yellow card) 90+3' | Recap | Ichiyanagi (yellow card) 27' (goal) 39' (pen.); Uchida 36', 67'; Wang Hsiang-yi (yellow card) 45'; Huang Sheng-chieh (yellow card) 45+3'; Chen You-lin (red card) 90+3' | Stadium: Ming Chuan University |

| 27 April 2025 35 | Leopard Cat | 9−0 | Wan Island | Taoyuan |
| 16:30 (UTC+8) | Yang Cheng-chun 21'; Izumi 45'; Baştuğ 50', 52', 63', 74'; Chen Yao-ming (yellow card) 55'; Fukasawa 58'; Chen Po-hao 70'; Huang Kuo-fu 80' | Recap | | Stadium: Ming Chuan University |

| 27 April 2025 36 | Babuza | 0−3 | Ming Chuan A | Taoyuan |
| 19:00 (UTC+8) | | Recap | Godoy 18'; Liu Chih-wen 35', 77' | Stadium: Ming Chuan University |

| Not played 37 | Wan Island | 0−3 | Sunny Bank AC Taipei | Taoyuan |
| | | | | Stadium: Ming Chuan University |
Note: Wan Island had insufficient players to start the match.

| 4 May 2025 38 | Ming Chuan A | 0−2 | Leopard Cat | Taoyuan |
| 17:00 (UTC+8) | Ng Pui-hei (yellow card) 90+2' | Recap | Lan Hao-yu 32'; Yang Cheng-chun 40'; Shih Shin-an (yellow card) 70'; Fukasawa (yellow card) 75' | Stadium: Ming Chuan University |

| 11 May 2025 39 | Sunny Bank AC Taipei | 12−0 | Babuza | Taoyuan |
| 16:30 (UTC+8) | Lee Tsung-yang 1'; 3' (o.g.); Uchida 3', 38'; 31' (o.g.); Yamazaki 41'; Chen Yi-yen 44', 60'; Yang Chia-pao 50', 62', 75'; 88' (o.g.) | Recap | | Stadium: Ming Chuan University |

| 11 May 2025 40 | Wan Island | 1−5 | Ming Chuan A | Taoyuan |
| 19:00 (UTC+8) | Hsiao Yu-cheng (yellow card) 25'; Wu Chia-han (yellow card) 72'; Wang Pao-fu 85' | Recap | Tsai Yi-jui 6'; Liu Chih-wen 54'; Godoy 65', 75'; 67' | Stadium: Ming Chuan University |

== Knockout stage ==
=== Bracket ===
Quarterfinals
A1 | Tainan City TSG Blue | 2
C2 | New Taipei Hang Yuan | 0
D2 | Sunny Bank AC Taipei | 0
B1 | Taichung Futuro | 4
C1 | Taipower (p) | 1 (4)
A2 | Taichung Rock | 1 (2)
B2 | Tainan City TSG Green | 2
D1 | Leopard Cat | 0

Semifinals
Tainan City TSG Blue | 5
Taichung Futuro | 0
Taipower | 4
Tainan City TSG Green | 2

Final
Tainan City TSG Blue | 1
Taipower | 0

=== Quarterfinals ===
| 17 May 2025 41 | Tainan City TSG Blue | 2−0 | New Taipei Hang Yuan | Taoyuan |
| 10:30 (UTC+8) | Yao Ko-chi (yellow card) 8'; Benchy 50' (pen.), 90+3'; Chen Wei-chuan (yellow card) 64'; Kuo Po-wei (yellow card) 86' | Recap | Koreeda (yellow card) 8' | Stadium: National Taiwan Sport University; Referee: Kuo Chan-yu |

| 17 May 2025 42 | Sunny Bank AC Taipei | 0−4 | Taichung Futuro | Taoyuan |
| 13:00 (UTC+8) | | Recap | Li Mao 50'; Lai Yi-chiao 56'; Takayama 71'; Hsu Heng-pin 90+5' | Stadium: National Taiwan Sport University; Referee: Chen Hsin-chuan |

| 17 May 2025 43 | Taipower | 1−1 (4–2 p) | Taichung Rock | Taoyuan |
| 15:30 (UTC+8) | Yeh Ching-chun 50' | Recap | Shih Jing-tang 82'; Tai Yan-yao (yellow card) 88' | Stadium: National Taiwan Sport University; Referee: Liu Hsiang-shao |
| | Penalties |
| | Chen Chao-an (penalty scored); Tu Shao-chieh (penalty scored); Yeh Ching-chun (penalty scored); Lee Hsiang-wei (penalty scored) | | (penalty scored) Chen Chih-wei; (penalty missed) Cheng Kai-yi; (penalty missed) Liao Yi-sheng; (penalty scored) Liao Chieh-yang |

| 17 May 2025 44 | Tainan City TSG Green | 2−0 | Leopard Cat | Taoyuan |
| 18:00 (UTC+8) | Porto 20' (yellow card) 85'; Chen Po-yu (yellow card) 38'; Gamaroni 65' | Recap | Lin Chih-hsuan (yellow card) 45+3' (yellow-red card) 85'; Chao Wei-chieh (yellow card) 81'; Baştuğ (yellow card) 90+9' | Stadium: National Taiwan Sport University; Referee: Kuo Chia-hao |

=== Semifinals ===
| 28 May 2025 45 | Tainan City TSG Blue | 5−0 | Taichung Futuro | Taoyuan |
| 16:00 (UTC+8) | Wu Chun-ching (yellow card) 31'; Chen Jui-chieh 51', 74'; Benchy 67'; Yao Ko-chi 84'; Kim Sung-kyum 90+5' | Recap | Lai Yi-chiao (yellow card) 13' | Stadium: National Taiwan Sport University; Referee: Yu Ming-hsun |

| 28 May 2025 46 | Taipower | 4−2 | Tainan City TSG Green | Taoyuan |
| 19:00 (UTC+8) | Chen Chao-an 30', 73', 85' (yellow card) 54'; Lee Hsiang-wei 52'; Tu Shao-chieh (yellow card) 79'; Lee Chun-chia (yellow card) 85' | Recap | Gamaroni 11' (yellow card) 90+6'; Lin Chun-kai (yellow card) 11'; Porto 38'; Wang Ruei (yellow card) 59'; Fong Shao-chi (yellow card) 75'; Lin Ming-wei (yellow card) 79'; Wei Chih-chuan (yellow card) 80' | Stadium: National Taiwan Sport University; Referee: Liu Hsiang-shao |

=== Final ===
31 May 2025
16:00 (UTC+8)
47

| Tainan City TSG Blue | 1−0 | Taipower |
|---|---|---|
| Sakkouh 22' | Recap |

National Taiwan Sport University, Taoyuan
Attendance: 296
Referee: Chen Hsin-chuan

| Tainan City TSG Blue | Taipower |

| GK | 1 | (Taiwan) Pan Wen-chieh |
| RB | 13 | (Taiwan) Kuo Po-wei | | (substituted off) 84' |
| CB | 3 | (South Korea) Kim Sung-kyum |
| CB | 2 | (Taiwan) Chen Wei-chuan |
| LB | 14 | (Taiwan) Liu Ho-han |
| RM | 7 | (Taiwan) Yao Ko-chi |
| CM | 26 | (France) Mohamed Sakkouh | (yellow card) 90+6' |
| CM | 11 | (Taiwan) Wu Chun-ching |
| LM | 9 | (Taiwan) Yu Chia-huang |
| CF | 20 | (Taiwan) Jhon Benchy |
| CF | 12 | (Taiwan) Chen Jui-chieh | | (substituted off) 78' |
Substitutes:
| GK | 22 | (Taiwan) Hung Shih-cheng |
| DF | 27 | (South Korea) Kim Sang-jun | | (substituted on) 84' |
| DF | 33 | (Taiwan) Tai Ya-cheng |
| DF | 35 | (Taiwan) Tseng Ting-yuan |
| MF | 17 | (Taiwan) Chen Wei-jen |
| MF | 34 | (Taiwan) Huang Po-lun |
| FW | 23 | (Taiwan) Lin Wei-chieh | | (substituted on) 78' |
| FW | 29 | (The Gambia) Salifu Jatta |
| FW | 32 | (Taiwan) Nien Chia-en |
Manager:
(Taiwan) Chang Sheng-ping

| GK | 1 | (Taiwan) Huang Chiu-lin |
| RB | 25 | (Taiwan) Lee Chun-chia |
| CB | 5 | (Taiwan) Chao Ming-hsiu | (yellow card) 40' |
| CB | 3 | (Taiwan) Huang Tzu-ming | (yellow card) 45+2' |
| LB | 4 | (Taiwan) Tseng Yun-hao | | (substituted off) 54' |
| DM | 22 | (Taiwan) Tu Shao-chieh | | (substituted off) 90' |
| RM | 27 | (Taiwan) Yang Ho-chiang | | (substituted off) 90' |
| CM | 10 | (Taiwan) Lee Hsiang-wei | | (substituted off) 64' |
| CM | 17 | (Taiwan) Hsu Po-chieh | | (substituted off) 64' |
| LM | 29 | (Taiwan) Lai Wei |
| CF | 7 | (Taiwan) Chen Chao-an |
Substitutes:
| GK | 31 | (Taiwan) Chang Hsiang-chun |
| DF | 11 | (Taiwan) Hsieh Po-an |
| DF | 16 | (Taiwan) Chang Cheng-yang | | (substituted on) 54' |
| MF | 6 | (Taiwan) Hung Yung-chun | (yellow card) 73' | (substituted on) 64' |
| MF | 13 | (Taiwan) Chen Po-hsun |
| MF | 77 | (Taiwan) Lai Chih-hsuan |
| FW | 2 | (Taiwan) Yang Chen-ying | | (substituted on) 90' |
| FW | 12 | (Taiwan) Huang Yi-han | | (substituted on) 90' |
| FW | 15 | (Taiwan) Wu Yu-fan |
| FW | 23 | (Taiwan) Tseng Chih-wei |
| FW | 28 | (Taiwan) Yeh Ching-chun | | (substituted on) 64' |
| FW | 99 | (Taiwan) Chiu Po-jui |
Manager:
(Taiwan) Huang Che-ming

Assistant referees:
Chen Chia-hao
Chen Hsiao-en
Fourth official:
Liu Hsiang-shao

Match rules

- 90 minutes
- 30 minutes of extra time if necessary
- Penalty shoot-out if scores still level
- Twelve named substitutes
- Maximum of five substitutions, with a sixth allowed in extra time

== Women's tournament ==
=== Group stage ===
==== Group A ====
| Pos | Team | Pld | W | D | L | GF | GA | GD | Pts | Qualification |
|---|---|---|---|---|---|---|---|---|---|---|
| 1 | Kaohsiung Attackers | 4 | 4 | 0 | 0 | 9 | 2 | +7 | 12 | Advanced to Semifinals |
| 2 | Hsinchu Strikers | 4 | 2 | 1 | 1 | 13 | 7 | +6 | 7 | Advanced to Semifinals |
| 3 | Taipei Bravo PlayOne | 4 | 2 | 1 | 1 | 3 | 2 | +1 | 7 | |
| 4 | Hualien | 4 | 1 | 0 | 3 | 7 | 8 | −1 | 3 | |
| 5 | Valkyrie | 4 | 0 | 0 | 4 | 2 | 15 | −13 | 0 | |

| 20 April 2025 1 | Kaohsiung Attackers | 1−0 | Taipei Bravo PlayOne | Kaohsiung |
| 18:30 (UTC+8) | Pan Shin-yu 53' | Recap | | Stadium: Kaohsiung Nanzih Football Stadium |

| 20 April 2025 2 | Hsinchu Strikers | 6−0 | Valkyrie | Kaohsiung |
| 18:30 (UTC+8) | Chen Ying-hsuan 2', 24', 32'; Lee Pei-yao 23'; Kao Hsin 27', 47' | | | Stadium: Kaohsiung Nanzih Football Stadium |

| 27 April 2025 6 | Valkyrie | 1−2 | Taipei Bravo PlayOne | Hualien |
| 15:00 (UTC+8) | Chang Tien-ling 29' | Recap | Liu Chih-ling 69'; Yu Hsiu-ching 80' | Stadium: Hualien Stadium |

| 27 April 2025 5 | Hualien | 0−1 | Kaohsiung Attackers | Hualien |
| 18:00 (UTC+8) | | Recap | Chen Yu-chin 56' | Stadium: Hualien Stadium |

| 3 May 2025 10 | Valkyrie | 0−3 | Hualien | Hualien |
| 17:30 (UTC+8) | | Recap | Chen Ya-hui 39'; Chen Yen-ping 74'; Lin Kai-ling 84' | Stadium: Hualien Stadium |

| 3 May 2025 9 | Taipei Bravo PlayOne | 0−0 | Hsinchu Strikers | Taoyuan |
| 18:30 (UTC+8) | | Recap | | Stadium: Ming Chuan University |

| 11 May 2025 13 | Hsinchu Strikers | 1−3 | Kaohsiung Attackers | Kaohsiung |
| 16:30 (UTC+8) | Yang Hsiao-chuan 35' | Recap | Wakabayashi 39'; Liang Kai-jou 45'; 55' (o.g.) | Stadium: Kaohsiung Nanzih Football Stadium |

| 11 May 2025 14 | Hualien | 0−1 | Taipei Bravo PlayOne | Kaohsiung |
| 16:30 (UTC+8) | | Recap | Hsieh Tsai-ting 8' | Stadium: Kaohsiung Nanzih Football Stadium |

| 8 June 2025 18 | Hsinchu Strikers | 6−4 | Hualien | Kaohsiung |
| 15:30 (UTC+8) | Lee Pei-yao 2', 8'; Yang Hsiao-chuan 13'; 37'; 60'; 75' | Recap | Chen Yen-ping 12'; Yang Hsuan 21'; Huang Hsiang-yi 22'; Lin Kai-ling 89' | Stadium: Kaohsiung Nanzih Football Stadium |

| 8 June 2025 17 | Kaohsiung Attackers | 4−1 | Valkyrie | Kaohsiung |
| 18:30 (UTC+8) | Wakabayashi 21'; Alaniz 25'; Yu Wen-chieh 45'; Uetsuji 90+1' | Recap | Yang Ya-han 69' | Stadium: Kaohsiung Nanzih Football Stadium |

==== Group B ====
| Pos | Team | Pld | W | D | L | GF | GA | GD | Pts | Qualification |
|---|---|---|---|---|---|---|---|---|---|---|
| 1 | Taichung Blue Whale | 4 | 4 | 0 | 0 | 15 | 3 | +12 | 12 | Advanced to Semifinals |
| 2 | New Taipei Hang Yuan | 4 | 2 | 1 | 1 | 14 | 6 | +8 | 7 | Advanced to Semifinals |
| 3 | Taichung Sakura | 4 | 1 | 2 | 1 | 8 | 5 | +3 | 5 | |
| 4 | Sunny Bank AC Taipei | 4 | 1 | 1 | 2 | 7 | 12 | −5 | 4 | |
| 5 | Science City | 4 | 0 | 0 | 4 | 2 | 20 | −18 | 0 | |

| 20 April 2025 4 | Science City | 1−5 | Taichung Sakura | Taichung |
| 13:00 (UTC+8) | Li Yong-shan 90' (o.g.) | Recap | Li Yong-shan 21'; Liu Peng-yi 23'; Sung Jui-hsuan 43'; Wu Ya-yu 67'; Ho Hsuan-yi 79' | Stadium: Taiyuan Football Field |

| 20 April 2025 3 | Taichung Blue Whale | 4−0 | New Taipei Hang Yuan | Taichung |
| 16:00 (UTC+8) | Pengngam 11'; Lin Jing-xuan 13'; Chen Jin-wen 81'; Lin Yu-syuan 86' | Recap | | Stadium: Taiyuan Football Field |

| 27 April 2025 7 | Sunny Bank AC Taipei | 2−7 | Taichung Blue Whale | Taichung |
| 13:00 (UTC+8) | Yasuzawa 47'; Li Yi-wen 82' | Recap | Pengngam 3', 51'; Liu Chien-yun 11'; Tanaka 38'; Wu Yu 46'; Chang Chi-lan 54'; Sornsai 64' | Stadium: Xitun Football Field |

| 27 April 2025 8 | Taichung Sakura | 2−2 | New Taipei Hang Yuan | Taichung |
| 16:00 (UTC+8) | Lee Hsiu-chin 61'; Huang Hui-shan 82' | Recap | Ho Chia-hsuan 7'; Matsunaga 86' (pen.) | Stadium: Xitun Football Field |

| 3 May 2025 11 | New Taipei Hang Yuan | 8−0 | Science City | Taichung |
| 13:00 (UTC+8) | Liu Yu-chiao 2', 56'; Pu Hsin-hui 10', 43', 90'; Ho Chia-hsuan 24', 87'; Teng Pei-lin 60' | Recap | | Stadium: Xitun Football Field |

| 3 May 2025 12 | Taichung Sakura | 0−0 | Sunny Bank AC Taipei | Taichung |
| 16:00 (UTC+8) | | Recap | | Stadium: Xitun Football Field |

| 11 May 2025 16 | Sunny Bank AC Taipei | 0−4 | New Taipei Hang Yuan | Taichung |
| 13:00 (UTC+8) | | Recap | Ho Chia-hsuan 10', 24'; Pu Hsin-hui 43'; Liu Yu-chiao 65' | Stadium: Taiyuan Football Field |

| 11 May 2025 15 | Science City | 0−2 | Taichung Blue Whale | Taichung |
| 16:00 (UTC+8) | | Recap | Intamee 12'; Sornsai 17' | Stadium: Taiyuan Football Field |

| 8 June 2025 20 | Science City | 1−5 | Sunny Bank AC Taipei | Taichung |
| 13:00 (UTC+8) | 45+1' | Recap | Li Yi-wen 52', 54', 56', 65', 75' | Stadium: Xitun Football Field |

| 8 June 2025 19 | Taichung Blue Whale | 2−1 | Taichung Sakura | Taichung |
| 16:00 (UTC+8) | Sornsai 7' (pen.); Lin Jing-xuan 10' | Recap | Wu Ya-yu 18' | Stadium: Xitun Football Field |

== Knockout stage ==
=== Bracket ===
Semifinals
A1 | Kaohsiung Attackers | 1 (7)
B2 | New Taipei Hang Yuan | 1 (6)
B1 | Taichung Blue Whale | 1 (3)
A2 | Hsinchu Strikers | 1 (2)

Final
Kaohsiung Attackers | 1
Taichung Blue Whale | 0

=== Semifinals ===
| 13 June 2025 21 | Kaohsiung Attackers | 1−1 (7–6 p) | New Taipei Hang Yuan | Kaohsiung |
| 13:30 (UTC+8) | Wakabayashi 90+2' | Recap | Ho Chia-hsuan 51' | Stadium: Kaohsiung Nanzih Football Stadium; Referee: Lee Yi-chi |
| | Penalties |
| | (penalty missed) Uetsuji; (penalty scored) Pan Shin-yu; (penalty scored) Liang Kai-jou; (penalty scored) Alaniz; (penalty scored) Wakabayashi; (penalty scored) Tsukamoto; (penalty scored) Lu Meng-fang; (penalty scored) Miki | | Pu Hsin-hui (penalty missed); Ho Chia-hsuan (penalty scored); Tseng Yun-ya (penalty scored); Su Hsin-yun (penalty scored); Matsunaga (penalty scored); Teng Pei-lin (penalty scored); Liu Yu-chiao (penalty scored); Pan Yen-hsin (penalty missed) |

| 13 June 2025 22 | Taichung Blue Whale | 1−1 (3–2 p) | Hsinchu Strikers | Kaohsiung |
| 16:00 (UTC+8) | Liu Chien-yun 2' | Recap | Chuan Tzu-yu 76' | Stadium: Kaohsiung Nanzih Football Stadium; Referee: Kuo Chan-yu |
| | Penalties |
| | (penalty missed) Sornsai; (penalty scored) Peng-ngam; (penalty scored) Huang Ke-sin; (penalty scored) Lin Jing-xuan | | Lin Hsiao-yun (penalty missed); Lee Chun-mei (penalty missed); Chen Ying-hsuan (penalty scored); Chuan Tzu-yu (penalty scored); Yang Hsiao-chuan (penalty missed) |

=== Final ===
15 June 2025
16:00 (UTC+8)
23

| Kaohsiung Attackers | 1−0 | Taichung Blue Whale |
|---|---|---|
| Wakabayashi 53' | Recap |

Kaohsiung Nanzih Football Stadium, Kaohsiung
Referee: Wang Chieh

| Kaohsiung Attackers | Taichung Blue Whale |

| GK | 1 | (Japan) Yoshimi Miki |
| RB | 20 | (Taiwan) Lee Wan-chen | (yellow card) 89' |
| CB | 8 | (Taiwan) Chan Pi-han | | (substituted off) 70' |
| CB | 4 | (Taiwan) Pan Hsin-yu |
| LB | 24 | (Taiwan) Yu Wen-chieh |
| DM | 11 | (Japan) Minori Wakabayashi |
| RM | 19 | (Taiwan) Chen Yu-chin | | (substituted off) 82' |
| CM | 7 | (Taiwan) Liang Kai-jou | | (substituted off) 89' |
| CM | 17 | (Japan) Yumi Uetsuji |
| LM | 3 | (Japan) Nao Tsukamoto |
| CF | 10 | (Argentina) Daiana Alaniz | | (substituted off) 70' |
Substitutes:
| GK | 18 | (Taiwan) Cheng Wen-hsuan |
| GK | 29 | (Taiwan) Tsai Hsuan-yu |
| DF | 2 | (Taiwan) Chang Yu-ting |
| DF | 6 | (Taiwan) Chien Wei-tung | | (substituted on) 89' |
| DF | 13 | (Taiwan) Lu Meng-fang | | (substituted on) 82' |
| DF | 15 | (Taiwan) Shen Yen-chun |
| DF | 16 | (Taiwan) Tseng Wen-ting |
| DF | 28 | (Taiwan) Wu Yen-yu |
| MF | 21 | (Hong Kong) Wai Yuen Ting | | (substituted on) 70' |
| MF | 25 | (Taiwan) Wei Tsai-ping |
| MF | 27 | (Taiwan) Huang Tsan-yu |
| FW | 23 | (Taiwan) Ting Chi | | (substituted on) 70' |
Manager:
(Spain) Jose Rojas

| GK | 25 | (Taiwan) Wu Fang-yu |
| RB | 2 | (Taiwan) Chang Chi-lan |
| CB | 5 | (Taiwan) Huang Ke-sin |
| CB | 21 | (Taiwan) Chen Ying-hui |
| LB | 30 | (Taiwan) Tuan Yu-jou | (substituted off) 70' |
| DM | 15 | (Taiwan) Lin Ya-hsuan |
| RM | 12 | (Taiwan) Wu Yu | (substituted off) 65' |
| CM | 24 | (Taiwan) Lin Yu-syuan | (substituted off) 59' |
| CM | 18 | (Taiwan) Chiang Tzu-shan |
| LM | 20 | (Taiwan) Chen Tzu-chen | (substituted off) 59' |
| CF | 9 | (Taiwan) Nien Ching-yun | (substituted off) HT' |
Substitutes:
| GK | 1 | (Taiwan) Tsai Ming-jung |
| GK | 26 | (Thailand) Waraporn Boonsing |
| DF | 22 | (Taiwan) Li Pei-jung |
| MF | 6 | (Thailand) Silawan Intamee |
| MF | 14 | (Japan) Maho Tanaka | (substituted on) 59' |
| MF | 16 | (Taiwan) Chen Jin-wen | (substituted on) 59' |
| MF | 19 | (Thailand) Pitsamai Sornsai | (substituted on) 70' |
| MF | 23 | (Taiwan) Liu Chien-yun |
| FW | 13 | (Thailand) Saowalak Peng-ngam | (substituted on) HT' |
| FW | 17 | (Taiwan) Lin Jing-xuan | (substituted on) 65' |
Manager:
(Taiwan) Lu Kuei-hua

Assistant referees:
Kuo Chan-yu
Yang Chen-yen
Fourth official:
Hsu Ling-tzu

Match rules

- 90 minutes
- 30 minutes of extra time if necessary
- Penalty shoot-out if scores still level
- Twelve named substitutes
- Maximum of five substitutions, with a sixth allowed in extra time

== Top scorers ==
Team eliminated for this round / Voided matches

=== Men ===
| Rank | Player | Team | M1 | M2 | M3 | M4 | QF | SF | F | Total |
|---|---|---|---|---|---|---|---|---|---|---|
| 1 | (Taiwan) Kao Kuan-yu | Taichung Rock B | 1 | 4 | | 2 | | | | 7 |
| 1 | (Brazil) Matheus Porto | Tainan City TSG Green | 2 | 3 | | | 1 | 1 | | 7 |
| 3 | (Taiwan) Jhon Benchy | Tainan City TSG Blue | 1 | 2 | | | 2 | 1 | | 6 |
| 3 | (Taiwan) Li Mao | Taichung Futuro | 3 | 2 | | | 1 | | | 6 |
| 5 | (Taiwan) Chen Chao-an | Taipower | 1 | | | 1 | | 3 | | 5 |
| 5 | (Taiwan) Chen Jui-chieh | Tainan City TSG Blue | 1 | | 1 | 1 | | 2 | | 5 |
| 5 | (Brazil) Antonio Gamaroni | Tainan City TSG Green | 2 | 1 | | | 1 | 1 | | 5 |
| 5 | (Taiwan) Hsu Heng-pin | Taichung Futuro | | | | 4 | 1 | | | 5 |
| 5 | (Taiwan) Shih Jing-tang | Taichung Rock | 1 | 1 | | 2 | 1 | | | 5 |
| 5 | (Taiwan) Yao Ko-chi | Tainan City TSG Blue | | 1 | 1 | 2 | | 1 | | 5 |
| 5 | (Taiwan) Yeh Ching-chun | Taipower | | 2 | | 2 | 1 | | | 5 |

=== Women ===
| Rank | Player | Team | M1 | M2 | M3 | M4 | SF | F | Total |
|---|---|---|---|---|---|---|---|---|---|
| 1 | (Taiwan) Ho Chia-hsuan | New Taipei Hang Yuan | | 1 | 2 | 2 | 1 | | 6 |
| 1 | (Taiwan) Li Yi-wen | Sunny Bank AC Taipei | 1 | | | 5 | | | 6 |
| 3 | (Taiwan) Pu Hsin-hui | New Taipei Hang Yuan | | | 3 | 1 | | | 4 |
| 3 | (Japan) Minori Wakabayashi | Kaohsiung Attackers | | | 1 | 1 | 1 | 1 | 4 |
| 5 | (Taiwan) Chen Ying-hsuan | Hsinchu Strikers | 3 | | | | | | 3 |
| 5 | (Taiwan) Lee Pei-yao | Hsinchu Strikers | 1 | | | 2 | | | 3 |
| 5 | (Taiwan) Liu Yu-chiao | New Taipei Hang Yuan | | | 2 | 1 | | | 3 |
| 5 | (Thailand) Saowalak Peng-ngam | Taichung Blue Whale | 1 | 2 | | | | | 3 |
| 5 | (Thailand) Pitsamai Sornsai | Taichung Blue Whale | | 1 | 1 | 1 | | | 3 |
| 10 | (Taiwan) Chen Yen-ping | Hualien | | 1 | | 1 | | | 2 |
| 10 | (Taiwan) Kao Hsin | Hsinchu Strikers | 2 | | | | | | 2 |
| 10 | (Taiwan) Lin Jing-xuan | Taichung Blue Whale | 1 | | | 1 | | | 2 |
| 10 | (Taiwan) Lin Kai-ling | Hualien | | 1 | | 1 | | | 2 |
| 10 | (Taiwan) Liu Chien-yun | Taichung Blue Whale | | 1 | | | 1 | | 2 |
| 10 | (Taiwan) Wu Ya-yu | Taichung Sakura | 1 | | | 1 | | | 2 |
| 10 | (Taiwan) Yang Hsiao-chuan | Hsinchu Strikers | | | 1 | 1 | | | 2 |

== Final standings ==
=== Men ===
| Pos | Grp | Team | Pld | W | D | L | GF | GA | GD | Pts | Final result |
|---|---|---|---|---|---|---|---|---|---|---|---|
| 1 | A | Tainan City TSG Blue | 7 | 7 | 0 | 0 | 27 | 4 | +23 | 21 | Champions |
| 2 | C | Taipower | 7 | 4 | 2 | 1 | 23 | 5 | +18 | 14 | Runners-up |
| 3 | B | Taichung Futuro | 6 | 5 | 0 | 1 | 19 | 7 | +12 | 15 | Eliminated in semifinals |
| 4 | B | Tainan City TSG Green | 6 | 4 | 0 | 2 | 22 | 9 | +13 | 12 | Eliminated in semifinals |
| 5 | D | Leopard Cat | 5 | 3 | 1 | 1 | 18 | 2 | +16 | 10 | Eliminated in quarterfinals |
| 6 | D | Sunny Bank AC Taipei | 5 | 3 | 1 | 1 | 18 | 5 | +13 | 10 | Eliminated in quarterfinals |
| 7 | C | New Taipei Hang Yuan | 5 | 2 | 2 | 1 | 10 | 5 | +5 | 8 | Eliminated in quarterfinals |
| 8 | A | Taichung Rock | 5 | 2 | 2 | 1 | 9 | 11 | −2 | 8 | Eliminated in quarterfinals |
| 9 | B | Taichung Rock B | 4 | 2 | 0 | 2 | 17 | 8 | +9 | 6 | Eliminated in group stage |
| 10 | D | Ming Chuan A | 4 | 2 | 0 | 2 | 9 | 6 | +3 | 6 | Eliminated in group stage |
| 11 | C | Hsinchu Xinyi Cosmos United | 4 | 2 | 0 | 2 | 7 | 18 | −11 | 6 | Eliminated in group stage |
| 12 | A | Sunny Bank AC Taipei Reserves | 4 | 1 | 1 | 2 | 11 | 10 | +1 | 4 | Eliminated in group stage |
| 13 | A | New Taipei FJCU | 4 | 1 | 1 | 2 | 7 | 12 | −5 | 4 | Eliminated in group stage |
| 14 | C | Inter Taoyuan Red | 4 | 1 | 0 | 3 | 6 | 12 | −6 | 3 | Eliminated in group stage |
| 15 | C | Inter Taipei | 4 | 0 | 1 | 3 | 2 | 9 | −7 | 1 | Eliminated in group stage |
| 16 | A | NUK Kuo Kuang | 4 | 0 | 1 | 3 | 6 | 15 | −9 | 1 | Eliminated in group stage |
| 17 | B | Ming Chuan B | 4 | 0 | 1 | 3 | 2 | 15 | −13 | 1 | Eliminated in group stage |
| 18 | D | Wan Island | 4 | 0 | 1 | 3 | 2 | 18 | −16 | 1 | Eliminated in group stage |
| 19 | D | Babuza | 4 | 0 | 1 | 3 | 1 | 23 | −22 | 1 | Eliminated in group stage |
| 20 | B | Inter Taoyuan Grey | 4 | 0 | 1 | 3 | 0 | 22 | −22 | 1 | Eliminated in group stage |

=== Women ===
| Pos | Grp | Team | Pld | W | D | L | GF | GA | GD | Pts | Final result |
|---|---|---|---|---|---|---|---|---|---|---|---|
| 1 | A | Kaohsiung Attackers | 6 | 5 | 1 | 0 | 11 | 3 | +8 | 16 | Champions |
| 2 | B | Taichung Blue Whale | 6 | 4 | 1 | 1 | 16 | 5 | +11 | 13 | Runners-up |
| 3 | B | New Taipei Hang Yuan | 5 | 2 | 2 | 1 | 15 | 7 | +8 | 8 | Eliminated in semifinals |
| 4 | A | Hsinchu Strikers | 5 | 2 | 2 | 1 | 14 | 8 | +6 | 8 | Eliminated in semifinals |
| 5 | A | Taipei Bravo PlayOne | 4 | 2 | 1 | 1 | 3 | 2 | +1 | 7 | Eliminated in group stage |
| 6 | B | Taichung Sakura | 4 | 1 | 2 | 1 | 8 | 5 | +3 | 5 | Eliminated in group stage |
| 7 | B | Sunny Bank AC Taipei | 4 | 1 | 1 | 2 | 7 | 12 | −5 | 4 | Eliminated in group stage |
| 8 | A | Hualien | 4 | 1 | 0 | 3 | 7 | 8 | −1 | 3 | Eliminated in group stage |
| 9 | A | Valkyrie | 4 | 0 | 0 | 4 | 2 | 15 | −13 | 0 | Eliminated in group stage |
| 10 | B | Science City | 4 | 0 | 0 | 4 | 2 | 20 | −18 | 0 | Eliminated in group stage |

== Awards ==
=== Men ===
| Award | Player | Team | Ref. |
|---|---|---|---|
| Golden Boot | (Taiwan) Chen Chao-an | Taipower | |
| Golden Glove | (Taiwan) Huang Chiu-lin | Taipower | |

=== Women ===
| Award | Player | Team | Ref. |
|---|---|---|---|
| Golden Boot | (Japan) Minori Wakabayashi | Kaohsiung Attackers | |
| Golden Glove | (Japan) Yoshimi Miki | Kaohsiung Attackers | |

== Notes ==
1. Each team was given only three opportunities to make substitutions, with a fourth opportunity in extra time, excluding substitutions made at half-time, before the start of extra time and at half-time in extra time.
