= List of foreign Taiwan Mulan Football League players =

This is a list of foreign players in Taiwan Mulan Football League (TMFL).

- Players in **bold** are currently playing in TMFL. Clubs in **bold** indicate their current clubs.
- Players ineligible to play for Chinese Taipei are considered as foreign players.
- Naturalized players are also listed below despite their eligibility for Chinese Taipei. Flags indicate their national origins.

== Naturalized players ==
- **(Japan) Maho Tanaka** – **Taichung Blue Whale** – 2019–
- **(Japan) Minori Wakabayashi** – **Kaohsiung Attackers** – 2020–

== Argentina ==
- Daiana Alaniz – Kaohsiung Attackers – 2025–2026

== Brazil ==
- **Flavia Feliciano** – **Kaohsiung Attackers** – 2026–

== Bulgaria ==
- **Aleksandra Yaneva** – **Kaohsiung Attackers** – 2026–

== Cambodia ==
- Melanie Hoekstra – Kaohsiung Attackers – 2024

== Cameroon ==
- Tatiana Ewodo – Taichung Blue Whale – 2026

== Costa Rica ==
- Britany Lewis – Inter Taoyuan – 2021
- Daniely Arguedas – Inter Taoyuan – 2021

== Ghana ==
- Gladys Amfobea – Inter Taoyuan – 2021

== Hong Kong ==
- Ng Cheuk Wai – Taichung Blue Whale, Taoyuan Mars – 2020–2022
- Sin Chung Yee – Taichung Blue Whale – 2025–2026
- Wai Yuen Ting – Kaohsiung Attackers – 2024–2025

== Japan ==
- **Kirara Fujio** – **Kaohsiung Attackers** – 2026–
- Marin Hamamoto – Kaohsiung Attackers – 2026
- **Iori Hidaka** – Taichung Blue Whale, **Taichung Sakura** – 2021–2022, 2025–
- Kokoro Hirata – Kaohsiung Attackers – 2024
- Sarah Matsuyama – Sunny Bank AC Taipei – 2025–2026
- **Yoshimi Miki** – **Kaohsiung Attackers** – 2024–
- **Kano Miyamoto** – **New Taipei Hang Yuan** – 2025–
- **Kaede Nakamura** – **New Taipei Hang Yuan** – 2026–
- **Yuka Nishiyama** – **New Taipei Hang Yuan** – 2026–
- **Kotomi Nitta** – **New Taipei Hang Yuan** – 2026–
- **Mai Okubo** – **New Taipei Hang Yuan** – 2026–
- **Moe Ota** – **New Taipei Hang Yuan** – 2025–
- **Mizuka Sato** – Kaohsiung Sunny Bank, **Taichung Blue Whale** – 2023, 2026–
- **Mei Sugita** – **Kaohsiung Attackers** – 2026–
- Yukina Tamamura – New Taipei Hang Yuan – 2023
- Miwa Tanaka – Taoyuan Mars, New Taipei Hang Yuan – 2022–2026
- Nao Tsukamoto – Kaohsiung Attackers – 2023–2026
- Yumi Uetsuji – Kaohsiung Attackers – 2024–2026
- **Masano Yamada** – **Taipei Bravo PlayOne** – 2026–

== Namibia ==
- Beverly Uueziua – New Taipei Hang Yuan – 2019

== Nicaragua ==
- **Erica Cunningham** – **Taichung Blue Whale** – 2026–

== Philippines ==
- **Anicka Castañeda** – **Taichung Blue Whale** – 2026–
- **Nina Meollo** – **Taichung Blue Whale** – 2026–

== Sierra Leone ==
- Sarah Bangura – Inter Taoyuan – 2021

== South Korea ==
- **Kim Ha-ram** – **Valkyrie** – 2026–
- **Lyu Ji-min** – **Valkyrie** – 2026–

== Spain ==
- **Martuka** – **Kaohsiung Attackers** – 2026–
- Cecilia Ruiz – Kaohsiung Attackers – 2025

== Thailand ==
- **Kanyarat Aikawa** – **Sunny Bank AC Taipei** – 2026–
- Pattaranan Aupachai – New Taipei Hang Yuan – 2024
- Waraporn Boonsing – Taichung Blue Whale – 2024
- **Jirakarn Chaimongkhol** – **Sunny Bank AC Taipei** – 2026–
- Silawan Intamee – Taichung Blue Whale – 2022–2026
- Nattaruja Muthtanawech – Taichung Blue Whale – 2021–2023
- Nipawan Panyosuk – New Taipei Hang Yuan – 2023–2024
- **Saowalak Pengngam** – **Taichung Blue Whale** – 2023–
- Phornphirun Philawan – Taichung Blue Whale – 2023
- **Pitsamai Sornsai** – Inter Taoyuan, **Taichung Blue Whale** – 2020–
- **Chotmanee Thongmongkol** – **Taichung Blue Whale** – 2025–

== United States ==
- Mariel Gutierrez – Taichung Blue Whale – 2021
- **Liz Harrington** – **Sunny Bank AC Taipei** – 2026–
- Chloe Mann – Inter Taoyuan – 2020
- Rebecca Sherry – Kaohsiung Sunny Bank – 2022
- Sienna Zaborski – Kaohsiung Sunny Bank – 2020

== Zimbabwe ==
- Emmaculate Msipa – Taoyuan Mars – 2022

== See also ==
- List of foreign Taiwan Football Premier League players

== Notes ==
1. Born in Canada
2. Born in England
3. Born in United States
4. Capped for the Bulgaria women's national football team
5. Capped for the Cambodia women's national football team
6. Capped for the Cameroon women's national football team
7. Capped for the Ghana women's national football team
8. Capped for the Ghana women's national under-17 football team
9. Capped for the Hong Kong women's national football team
10. Capped for the Hong Kong women's national under-19 football team
11. Capped for the Hong Kong women's national under-16 football team
12. Capped for the Japan women's national football team
13. Capped for the Japan women's national under-20 football team
14. Capped for the Namibia women's national football team
15. Capped for the Namibia women's national under-17 football team
16. Capped for the Namibia women's national under-15 football team
17. Capped for the Nicaragua women's national football team
18. Capped for the Philippines women's national football team
19. Capped for the Sierra Leone women's national football team
20. Capped for the Thailand women's national football team
21. Capped for the Thailand women's national under-19 football team
22. Capped for the Thailand women's national under-16 football team
23. Capped for the Thailand women's national under-14 football team
24. Capped for the Zimbabwe women's national football team
