= 2025–26 Taiwan Mulan Football League =

Taiwan Mulan Football League
- Season: 2025–26
- Dates: 16 August 2025 – 23 May 2026
- Champions: New Taipei Hang Yuan (1st title)
- AWCL: New Taipei Hang Yuan
- Matches: 84
- Goals: 285 (3.39 per match)
- Best player: Wei Yu-fei
- Top goalscorer: Saowalak Peng-ngam (17 goals)
- Best goalkeeper: Yoshimi Miki
- Biggest home win: Taichung Blue Whale 6–0 Sunny Bank AC Taipei (23 May 2026)
- Biggest away win: Sunny Bank AC Taipei 0–8 Kaohsiung Attackers (21 March 2026); Taipei Bravo PlayOne 0–8 Kaohsiung Attackers (16 May 2026)
- Highest scoring: Sunny Bank AC Taipei 0–8 Kaohsiung Attackers (21 March 2026); Taipei Bravo PlayOne 0–8 Kaohsiung Attackers (16 May 2026)
- Longest winning run: Kaohsiung Attackers (11 matches)
- Longest unbeaten run: Kaohsiung Attackers (18 matches)
- Longest winless run: Taipei Bravo PlayOne (14 matches)
- Longest losing run: Valkyrie (9 matches)
- Highest attendance: 532; Kaohsiung Attackers 0–0 Taichung Blue Whale (13 December 2025)
- Lowest attendance: 18; Taipei Bravo PlayOne 0–2 Taichung Blue Whale (20 December 2025)
- Attendance: 9,221 (110 per match)
- All statistics correct as of 12 June 2026.

The 2025–26 Taiwan Mulan Football League is the 12th season of Taiwan Mulan Football League. Starting from this season, the league will change to July-June season format. The season begins on 16 August 2025 and finishes on 23 May 2026.

== Teams ==
=== Promotions and relegations ===
There are 8 teams in the league, including 5 teams from the 2024 season and 3 team qualified from the 2025 Taiwan President FA Cup.

==== Incoming teams ====
With the league expansion to 8 teams this season, a total of four playing spots were eligible. Taichung Sakura, Sunny Bank AC Taipei, Hualien and Valkyrie were the qualified teams from the 2025 President FA Cup.

==== Outgoing team ====
Hualien and Mars, finishing 5th and 6th in 2024 season were required to play in the 2025 Taiwan President FA Cup, which was the qualifier for the 2025–26 season. Hualien qualified from the President FA Cup while Mars did not participate.

Promoted teams from 2025 President FA Cup	Relegated teams from 2024 TMFL
Sunny Bank AC Taipei; Taichung Sakura; Valkyrie	Mars

=== Teams and locations ===
Team	Chinese	Based in	Seasons in TMFL	First season in TMFL
Hualien	花蓮	Hualien County	12	2014
Kaohsiung Attackers	高雄先鋒	Kaohsiung City	10	2016
New Taipei Hang Yuan	新北航源	New Taipei City	8	2017
Sunny Bank AC Taipei	陽信北競	Taipei City	1	2025–26
Taichung Blue Whale	台中藍鯨	Taichung City	12	2014
Taichung Sakura	台中櫻花	Taichung City	1	2025–26
Taipei Bravo PlayOne	臺北熊讚PlayOne	Taipei City	9	2017
Valkyrie	女武神	Taipei City	1	2025–26

=== Venues ===
Taiwan Mulan Football League teams currently don't play all their home games in a specific home ground. All venues will hold two different matches in a single matchday.

Location of venues in 2025–26 Taiwan Mulan Football League

Stadium	Chinese	Location	Capacity
Fu Jen Catholic University Stadium	輔仁大學足球場	New Taipei City	3,000
Hsinchu County Second Stadium	新竹縣立第二體育場	Hsinchu County	2,500
Hualien Stadium	花蓮縣立田徑場	Hualien County	12,800
Kaohsiung Nanzih Football Stadium	高雄市立楠梓足球場	Kaohsiung City	1,200
National Yilan Senior High School	國立宜蘭高中	Yilan County	
Taipei Municipal Stadium	臺北田徑場	Taipei City	20,000
Taiyuan Football Field	太原足球場	Taichung City	600
Xitun Football Field	西屯足球場	Taichung City	200

=== Foreign players ===
- Players name in **bold** indicates the player was registered during the mid-season transfer window.

Hualien	Kaohsiung Attackers	New Taipei Hang Yuan	Sunny Bank AC Taipei	Taichung Blue Whale	Taichung Sakura	Taipei Bravo PlayOne	Valkyrie
—N/a	(Argentina) Daiana Alaniz **(Japan) Kirara Fujio** **(Japan) Marin Hamamoto** (Japan) Yoshimi Miki; ~~(Spain) Cecilia Ruiz~~ (Japan) Nao Tsukamoto (Japan) Yumi Uetsuji; ~~(Hong Kong) Wai Yuen Ting~~ (Japan) Minori Wakabayashi	(Japan) Kano Miyamoto **(Japan) Kotomi Nitta** (Japan) Moe Ota (Japan) Miwa Tanaka	(Japan) Sarah Matsuyama	**(Cameroon) Tatiana Ewodo** (Thailand) Silawan Intamee (Thailand) Saowalak Peng-ngam **(Japan) Mizuka Sato** (Hong Kong) Sin Chung Yee (Thailand) Pitsamai Sornsai (Japan) Maho Tanaka (Thailand) Chotmanee Thongmongkol	(Japan) Iori Hidaka	—N/a	—N/a

=== Personnel and sponsorship ===
Team	Manager	Captain	Kit manufacturer	Main kit sponsor
Hualien	(Taiwan) Luo Hui-tsu	(Taiwan) Lin Kai-ling	(Taiwan) Tor Star	—N/a
Kaohsiung Attackers	(Spain) José Rojas	(Chinese Taipei) Tseng Wen-ting	(Japan) Athleta	Matrix Fitness
New Taipei Hang Yuan	(Taiwan) Hung Chin-hwai	(Chinese Taipei) Saki Matsunaga	(Taiwan) Entes	—N/a
Sunny Bank AC Taipei	(Spain) Ruben Fortunato	(Chinese Taipei) Hsu Yi-yun	(China) Ucan	Sunny Bank
Taichung Blue Whale	(Taiwan) Lu Kuei-hua	(Chinese Taipei) Tsai Ming-jung	(Taiwan) Mie	Skechers
Taichung Sakura	(Taiwan) Hou Fang-wei	(Chinese Taipei) Sung Yu-ting	(Spain) Joma	Footballer
Taipei Bravo PlayOne	(Jamaica) Oliver Harley	(Chinese Taipei) Hsieh Yi-ling	(Spain) Joma	Formosa Pharmaceuticals, Inc.
Valkyrie	(Taiwan) Lo Chih-an	(Chinese Taipei) Yang Ya-han	(Spain) Joma	Heho Sports

=== Managerial changes ===
Team	Outgoing manager	Manner of departure	Date of vacancy	Position in table	Incoming manager	Date of appointment
Hualien	(Taiwan) Ju Wen-bin	—N/a	23 November 2024	Pre-season	(Taiwan) Luo Hui-tsu	16 August 2025
Taipei Bravo PlayOne	(Taiwan) Shieh Su-jean	—N/a	23 November 2024	Pre-season	(Jamaica) Oliver Harley	22 July 2025
Kaohsiung Attackers	(Japan) Takeshi Inoguchi	Mutual consent	29 November 2024	Pre-season	(Spain) José Rojas	7 January 2025
Sunny Bank AC Taipei	(Spain) Mario Peso	—N/a	19 December 2025	5th	(Egypt) Karim Elnile (caretaker)	20 December 2025
Sunny Bank AC Taipei	(Egypt) Karim Elnile	End of caretaker spell	21 December 2025	6th	(Spain) Ruben Fortunato	24 January 2026
Valkyrie	(Taiwan) Pen Wu-sung	Assigned to advisor	23 January 2026	7th	(Taiwan) Lo Chih-an	23 January 2026

== League table ==
Pos	Team	Pld	W	D	L	GF	GA	GD	Pts	Qualification or relegation
1	New Taipei Hang Yuan (C)	21	17	3	1	71	10	+61	54	Qualification for the AFC Women's Champions League
2	Kaohsiung Attackers	21	16	4	1	65	11	+54	52	
3	Taichung Blue Whale	21	15	3	3	54	17	+37	48	
4	Hualien	21	8	3	10	26	31	−5	27	
5	Taichung Sakura	21	8	2	11	22	47	−25	26	
6	Sunny Bank AC Taipei	21	7	0	14	28	50	−22	21	
7	Valkyrie	21	2	1	18	11	61	−50	7 (Note: Ranked on overall goals scored: Valkyrie 11, Taipei Bravo PlayOne 8)	Qualification for the 2026–27 Taiwan Mulan Football League qualifiers
8	Taipei Bravo PlayOne	21	1	4	16	8	58	−50	7	Qualification for the 2026–27 Taiwan Mulan Football League qualifiers

Rules for classification: 1) Points; 2) Head-to-head points; 3) Head-to-head goal difference; 4) Head-to-head goals scored; 5) Overall goal difference; 6) Overall goals scored; 7) Fewer disciplinary points; 8) Draw lots
(C) Champions

=== Position by round ===
Team ╲ Round	1	2	3	4	5	6	7	8	9	10	11	12	13	14	15	16	17	18	19	20	21
Hualien	6	6	5	4	4	4	5	6	6	6	4	4	4	4	4	5	6	6	5	4	4
Kaohsiung Attackers	4	5	6	6	3	3	3	3	3	3	3	3	3	3	2	1	1	1	1	1	2
New Taipei Hang Yuan	5	3	2	2	2	2	1	1	1	1	1	1	1	1	1	2	2	2	2	2	1
Sunny Bank AC Taipei	1	1	4	5	5	6	6	5	5	5	6	5	5	6	6	6	5	5	6	6	6
Taipei Bravo PlayOne	8	8	7	7	7	7	8	8	8	8	8	8	8	8	8	8	8	8	8	8	8
Taichung Blue Whale	2	2	1	1	1	1	2	2	2	2	2	2	2	2	3	3	3	3	3	3	3
Taichung Sakura	3	4	3	3	6	5	4	4	4	4	5	6	6	5	5	4	4	4	4	5	5
Valkyrie	6	7	8	8	8	8	7	7	7	7	7	7	7	7	7	7	7	7	7	7	7

= Qualification for the AFC Women's Champions League; = Qualification for the 2026–27 Taiwan Mulan Football League qualifiers

== Results ==
=== Qualifying result in 2025 Taiwan President FA Cup ===
Pos	Team	Pld	W	D	L	GF	GA	GD	Pts	Qualifying result
4	Hsinchu Strikers	5	2	2	1	14	8	+6	8	Ineligible
6	Taichung Sakura	4	1	2	1	8	5	+3	5	Qualified
7	Sunny Bank AC Taipei	4	1	1	2	7	12	-5	4	Qualified
8	Hualien	4	1	0	3	7	8	-1	3	Qualified
9	Valkyrie	4	0	0	4	2	15	-13	0	Qualified
10	Science City	4	0	0	3	2	20	-18	0	Eliminated

=== Regular season ===
Each team plays a total of 21 games, playing the other teams three times.

Home \ Away	HUA	KHA	NTH	SAC	TBW	TCS	TBP	VAL	HUA	KHA	NTH	SAC	TBW	TCS	TBP	VAL
Hualien	—	1–1	0–2	1–0	0–1	2–0	5–2	2–1	—	—	0–2	2–1	—	1–2	1–1	1–0
Kaohsiung Attackers	1–0	—	2–2	2–1	0–0	5–0	4–0	4–2	1–0	—	1–0	—	—	5–0	—	—
New Taipei Hang Yuan	5–1	2–2	—	5–0	3–1	2–0	3–0	4–0	—	—	—	5–0	—	5–0	4–0	—
Sunny Bank AC Taipei	2–0	0–3	0–4	—	2–3	2–1	3–0	0–1	—	0–8	—	—	—	0–2	3–1	4–1
Taichung Blue Whale	1–1	1–0	2–2	2–1	—	3–0	2–0	3–0	4–0	1–2	0–1	6–0	—	—	—	—
Taichung Sakura	3–1	1–4	1–6	2–1	0–6	—	0–0	1–0	—	—	—	—	1–3	—	—	4–0
Taipei Bravo PlayOne	0–3	0–4	0–4	0–3	0–2	0–1	—	0–1	—	0–8	—	—	2–6	0–0	—	—
Valkyrie	1–4	0–3	0–5	1–5	1–4	1–2	1–1	—	—	0–5	0–5	—	0–3	—	0–1	—

Legend: Blue = home team win; Yellow = draw; Red = away team win.

=== Results by round ===
Team ╲ Round	1	2	3	4	5	6	7	8	9	10	11	12	13	14	15	16	17	18	19	20	21
Hualien	L	D	W	W	L	L	L	D	L	W	W	W	W	L	L	L	L	D	W	W	L
Kaohsiung Attackers	D	D	L	W	W	W	W	D	W	D	W	W	W	W	W	W	W	W	W	W	W
New Taipei Hang Yuan	D	W	W	W	W	W	W	D	W	W	W	D	W	W	W	L	W	W	W	W	W
Sunny Bank AC Taipei	W	W	L	L	W	L	L	W	L	W	L	L	L	L	L	W	W	L	L	L	L
Taichung Blue Whale	W	W	W	W	W	W	L	D	W	D	W	D	W	W	L	W	W	L	W	W	W
Taichung Sakura	W	L	W	L	L	D	W	W	L	L	L	L	L	W	W	W	L	W	L	L	D
Taipei Bravo PlayOne	L	L	L	L	L	D	L	L	L	L	L	D	L	L	W	L	L	D	L	L	D
Valkyrie	L	L	L	L	L	L	W	L	W	L	L	D	L	L	L	L	L	L	L	L	L

W = Win; D = Draw; L = Loss

== Statistics ==
=== Scoring ===
- First goal of the season:
  (Taiwan) Sung Jui-hsuan (Taichung Sakura) against Valkyrie (16 August 2025)
- Last goal of the season:
  (Japan) Mizuka Sato (Taichung Blue Whale) against Sunny Bank AC Taipei (23 May 2026)

=== Top goalscorers ===
Rank	Player	Club	Goals
1	(Thailand) Saowalak Peng-ngam	Taichung Blue Whale	17
2	(Japan) Marin Hamamoto	Kaohsiung Attackers	15
3	(Taiwan) Pu Hsin-hui	New Taipei Hang Yuan	14
4	(Japan) Sarah Matsuyama	Sunny Bak AC Taipei	11
5	(Taiwan) Chen Yu-chin	New Taipei Hang Yuan	10
5	(Japan) Nao Tsukamoto	Kaohsiung Attackers	10
7	(Taiwan) Lai Li-chin	Taichung Sakura	9
7	(Japan) Maho Tanaka	Taichung Blue Whale	9
7	(Japan) Miwa Tanaka	New Taipei Hang Yuan	9
10	(Taiwan) Lee Yi-wen	Sunny Bak AC Taipei	8

==== Hat-tricks ====
Player	For	Against	Score	Date	Round
(Taiwan) Lee Yi-wen^{4}	Sunny Bank AC Taipei	Valkyrie	5–1 (A)	23 August 2025	2
(Thailand) Saowalak Peng-ngam^{4}	Taichung Blue Whale	Taichung Sakura	6–0 (A)	23 August 2025	2
(Taiwan) Pu Hsin-hui	New Taipei Hang Yuan	Valkyrie	5–0 (A)	13 September 2025	3
(Taiwan) Lin Kai-ling	Hualien	Valkyrie	4–1 (A)	20 September 2025	4
(Japan) Nao Tsukamoto	Kaohsiung Attackers	Taichung Sakura	4–1 (A)	20 September 2025	4
(Japan) Sarah Matsuyama	Sunny Bank AC Taipei	Taipei Bravo PlayOne	3–0 (H)	22 November 2025	8
(Japan) Marin Hamamoto	Kaohsiung Attackers	Sunny Bank AC Taipei	8–0 (A)	21 March 2026	15
(Japan) Nao Tsukamoto	Kaohsiung Attackers	Sunny Bank AC Taipei	8–0 (A)	21 March 2026	15
(Japan) Marin Hamamoto	Kaohsiung Attackers	Taichung Sakura	5–0 (H)	9 May 2026	19
(Taiwan) Chen Yu-chin^{4}	New Taipei Hang Yuan	Taichung Sakura	5–0 (H)	16 May 2026	20

^{4} – Player scored four goals.

==== Own goals ====
Player	For	Against	Date	Round
(Taiwan) Sung Hsin-ning	Valkyrie	New Taipei Hang Yuan	13 September 2025	3
(Taiwan) Tseng Min-hsien	Taipei Bravo PlayOne	Taichung Blue Whale	20 September 2025	4
(Taiwan) Wu Hsin-ni	Valkyrie	New Taipei Hang Yuan	13 December 2025	10
(Taiwan) Chien Hsuan-ying	Sunny Bank AC Taipei	New Taipei Hang Yuan	20 December 2025	11
(Taiwan) Ku Chien-yu	Hualien	Valkyrie	20 December 2025	11
(Taiwan) Wu Chih-ying	Taipei Bravo PlayOne	Taichung Blue Whale	20 December 2025	11
(Taiwan) Lin Yu-hui	Taichung Sakura	Hualien	24 January 2026	12
(Taiwan) Cheng Ssu-yu	Taichung Sakura	New Taipei Hang Yuan	31 January 2026	13
(Taiwan) Chang Tien-ling	Valkyrie	New Taipei Hang Yuan	2 May 2026	18
(Taiwan) Shao Tzu-han	Taipei Bravo PlayOne	Kaohsiung Attackers	16 May 2026	20
(Taiwan) Chang Yu-ting	Valkyrie	Kaohsiung Attackers	23 May 2026	21

=== Clean Sheets ===
Rank	Player	Club	Shutouts
1	(Japan) Yoshimi Miki	Kaohsiung Attackers	13
1	(Taiwan) Wang Yu-ting	New Taipei Hang Yuan	13
3	(Thailand) Chotmanee Thongmongkol	Taichung Blue Whale	6
4	(Taiwan) Chien Yu-chieh	Hualien	4
4	(Taiwan) Tsai Ming-jung	Taichung Blue Whale	4
6	(Taiwan) Chen Chiao-lun	Sunny Bank AC Taipei	3
6	(Taiwan) Cheng Ssu-yu	Taichung Sakura	3
6	(Taiwan) Wang Juo-ping	Taichung Sakura	3
6	(Taiwan) Wu Fang-yu	Taichung Blue Whale	3
10	(Taiwan) Chu Fang-yi	Valkyrie	2
10	(Taiwan) Tseng Min-hsien	Taipei Bravo PlayOne	2

=== Discipline ===
==== Player ====
- Most yellow cards: 3
  - (Taiwan) Zhuo Li-ping (Hualien)
  - (Taiwan) Lin Szu-ying (Taichung Sakura)
- Most red cards: 1
  - (Taiwan) Liu Yu-chiao (New Taipei Hang Yuan)
  - (Taiwan) Lin Wan-rong (Hualien)

==== Team ====
- Most yellow cards: 10
  - New Taipei Hang Yuan
- Fewest yellow cards: 5
  - Taichung Sakura
  - AC Taipei
- Most red cards: 1
  - New Taipei Hang Yuan
  - Hualien
- Fewest red cards: 0
  - 6 teams

== Awards ==
Award	Winner	Club	Ref.
Player of the Year	(Taiwan) Wei Yu-fei	Sunny Bank AC Taipei	
Coach of the Year	(Taiwan) Hung Chin-hwai	New Taipei Hang Yuan	
Golden Boot	(Thailand) Saowalak Peng-ngam	Taichung Blue Whale	
Golden Gloves	(Japan) Yoshimi Miki	Kaohsiung Attackers	

== See also ==
- 2025–26 Taiwan Football Premier League
- 2025–26 Taiwan Football League 2
