= Salifu Jatta =

Gambian footballer

Personal information
- Full name: Salifu Jatta
- Date of birth: December 11, 1995 (age 30)
- Place of birth: Serekunda, The Gambia
- Height: 1.94 m (6 ft 4 in)
- Position: Forward

Team information
- Current team: Tainan City
- Number: 29

College career
Years	Team	Apps	(Gls)
2014–2016	Evergreen Valley Hawks	41	(23)
2016–2017	Fort Lewis Skyhawks	34	(4)

Senior career*
Years	Team	Apps	(Gls)
2018	Nevada Coyotes	22	(17)
2019	Corpus Christi	14	(7)
2019–2020	Oakland Roots	3	(0)
2020–2021	Stumptown AC	0	(0)
2022	Contra Costa	4	(2)
2023–2024	Meshakhte Tkibuli	8	(5)
2024	Manila Digger	13	(7)
2024	Davao Aguilas	5	(1)
2025–	Tainan City	7	(4)
- * Club domestic league appearances and goals as of 1 June 2025

Salifu Jatta (born 11 December 1995) is a Gambian professional footballer who plays as a forward for Taiwan Premier League club Tainan City.

== Personal life ==
Jatta was born in Serekunda in The Gambia. He left his country for the United States at age 14 and graduated from South San Francisco High School.

== Career ==
=== College career ===
After high school, Jatta attended San Jose State University, playing initially for the school's club team, he was supposed to be a walk-on for the varsity team the following year. However, due to coaching shake-ups, he ended up, first playing college football for the Hawks of Evergreen Valley College. In 2015, he was part of the 2015 All Northern California team.

In 2016, he transferred colleges where he played football for the Skyhawks of Fort Lewis College, playing 34 games across two seasons before graduating.

=== Club career in the US ===
Jatta signed his first club contract with the Nevada Coyotes of the United Premier Soccer League, where he stayed for two years. He played for a number of clubs in the lower divisions of the US soccer system, first signing with Corpus Christi for a short stint in 2019 before signing for Oakland Roots a year after. He subsequently plied his trade at Stumptown for the 2020–2021 season and Contra Costa for the 2021–2022 season.

=== Meshakhte Tkibuli ===
In 2023, he played for the first time outside the US as he signed with Meshakhte Tkibuli in the Liga 3 of Georgia. He would stay with the club until departing in early 2024.

=== Manila Digger ===
In early 2024, it was reported that Jatta had signed with Philippines club Manila Digger of the PFL, making his first appearance for the club in their opening game, a 2–1 win over Philippine Army. He scored his first goal in a 3–1 win over Loyola, also scoring a brace against United City and a header against Kaya–Iloilo.
