= Tatiana Ewodo =

Cameroonian footballer (born 1997)

Personal information
- Full name: Gladys Tatiana Ewodo Ekogo
- Date of birth: 9 February 1997 (age 29)
- Place of birth: Mfoundi, Cameroon
- Height: 1.69 m (5 ft 7 in)
- Position: Striker

Team information
- Current team: Amed
- Number: 99

Senior career*
| Years | Team | Apps | (Gls) |
| –2018 | Louves Minproff | | |
| 2019 | Yenisey Krasnoyarsk | 18 | (4) |
| 2020 | Zenit Saint Petersburg | 8 | (0) |
| 2021–2022 | Yenisey Krasnoyarsk | 39 | (10) |
| 2023– | CSKA >Moscow | 23 | (2) |
| 2025 | Amed | 7 | (4) |
| 2025–2026 | Taichung Blue Whale | 9 | (2) |
| 2026– | Amed | 9 | (3) |

International career
| 2022–3023 | Cameroon | | |
- * Club domestic league appearances and goals as of 14 November 2026

Gladys Tatiana Ewodo Ekogo (born 9 February 1997) is a Cameroonian footballer who plays as a striker for Amed in the Turkish Women's Super League.

== Club career ==
Ewodo started football playing at the age of five inspired by her national footballer father. Although her family was not particularly supportive of her ambition, they have been a huge source of support for her later.

She started her club career with Louves Minproff şn her country, helping the club win the Cameroonian Women's Cup.

Before the 2019 season, she went to Russia, and joined Yenisey Krasnoyarsk, where she became the first foreign player to sign for the club, and was regarded as a fan favorite. During the 2022 season, she scored seven goals in 19 league games.

In the beginning of 2023, she transferred to CSKA Moscow.

In February 2025, she moved to Turkey, and signed with the Diyarbakır-based club Amed to play in the second half of the 2024–25 Women's Super League season. She appeared in seven games and scored four goals. At the end of the league season, she left the club.

She went to Taiwan, and signed with Taichung Blue Whale, and played in the 2025–26 Mulan League.

In September 2026, she returned to Turkey, and rejoned her previous club Amed to play in the 2026–27 Women's Super League season.

== International career ==
Ewodo was part of the Cameroon national team at the 2022 Women's Africa Cup of Nations in Morocco and 2023 FIFA Women's World Cup play-off tournament.

== Personal life ==
Ewodo was born to footballer Charles Ewodo, in Mfoundi, Cameroon, on 9 February 1997.

She attended Mbankomo Group II public school in Cameroon.
