= Wai Yuen Ting =

Hongkonger football and futsal player

Personal information
- Full name: Wai Yuen Ting
- Date of birth: 15 October 1992 (age 34)
- Place of birth: Sha Tin, Hong Kong
- Height: 1.62 m (5 ft 4 in)
- Position: Midfielder

Team information
- Current team: SKH Chan Yung Secondary School (manager)

Youth career
- 2006–2007: Kwai Tsing
- 2007–2009: Hong Kong Rangers
- 2009–2010: Oakton High School

College career
Years	Team	Apps	(Gls)
2012	Shenandoah Community College		
2013	Washington State University		

Senior career*
Years	Team	Apps	(Gls)
2015–2020	Citizen	66	(25)
2020	Vllaznia	9	(3)
2020–2023	Shatin	34	(17)
2023	Chonburi	6	(4)
2023–2024	Shatin		
2024–2025	Kaohsiung Attackers		

International career
2016–	Hong Kong	19	(4)
2018	Hong Kong (futsal)		

Managerial career
- 2018–: SKH Chan Yung Secondary School
- * Club domestic league appearances and goals

Wai Yuen Ting (Chinese: 韋婉婷; born 15 October 1992) is a Hong Kong professional footballer who plays as a midfielder. She is also a futsal player, and represented Hong Kong internationally in both football and futsal.

== Club career ==
Wai Yuen Ting startup the career at Citizen in Hong Kong since 2015.

In 2020, Wai Yuen Ting played for Albanian football club Vllaznia and get the champion.

In 2023, Wai Yuen Ting played for Thai Women's League 1. football club Chonburi FA.

== International career ==
Wai Yuen Ting has been capped for Hong Kong at senior level in both football and futsal. In football, she represented Hong Kong at two EAFF E-1 Football Championship editions (2017 and 2019), the 2018 AFC Women's Asian Cup qualification, the 2018 Asian Games and the 2020 AFC Women's Olympic Qualifying Tournament.

In futsal, Wai Yuen Ting played for Hong Kong at the 2018 AFC Women's Futsal Championship.

== International goals ==
No.	Date	Venue	Opponent	Score	Result	Competition
1.	11 November 2018	IPE Chonburi Stadium, Chonburi, Thailand	Lebanon	2–0	4–0	2020 AFC Women's Olympic Qualifying Tournament
2.	11 November 2018	IPE Chonburi Stadium, Chonburi, Thailand	Lebanon	3–0	4–0	2020 AFC Women's Olympic Qualifying Tournament
3.	6 April 2019	Transportation Institute Stadium, Tashkent, Uzbekistan	Vietnam	1–2	1–2	2020 AFC Women's Olympic Qualifying Tournament
4.	14 July 2024	Hong Kong Football Club, Happy Valley, Hong Kong	Indonesia	1–0	4–1	Friendly

== See also ==
- List of Hong Kong women's international footballers
