= Teng Pei-lin =

Taiwanese footballer

Personal information
- Full name: Teng Pei-lin (鄧霈璘)
- Date of birth: October 6, 2002 (age 24)
- Place of birth: Taiwan
- Height: 1.67 m (5 ft 6 in)
- Position: Defender

Team information
- Current team: Hang Yuan FC
- Number: 6

Senior career*
Years	Team	Apps	(Gls)
2025–	Hang Yuan FC	2	(0)

International career^{‡}
2025–	Chinese Taipei women's national football team	4	(0)
- * Club domestic league appearances and goals ‡ National team caps and goals as of 23 March 2026

Teng Pei-lin (Chinese: 鄧霈璘; born 6 October 2002) is a Taiwanese professional footballer who plays as a defender for Hang Yuan FC and the Chinese Taipei women's national football team. She has represented Chinese Taipei in international competitions including continental qualification tournaments and invitational events.

== Early life ==
Teng Pei-lin was born in Taiwan. Publicly available information regarding her early life and youth development remains limited.

== Club career ==
=== Hang Yuan FC ===
Teng joined Hang Yuan FC in 2025. The club competes in Taiwan's top women's football competitions. Since joining, she has been part of the senior squad and has made appearances in domestic league matches.

She primarily features as a defender and contributes to the team's defensive organisation.

== International career ==
Teng made her senior debut for the Chinese Taipei women's national football team in 2025 and has since earned caps in international competition.

She has participated in qualification matches for the AFC Women's Asian Cup, as well as international friendlies.

Teng has also taken part in international tournaments such as the Pinatar Cup and the EAFF E-1 Football Championship.

In international fixtures, she has faced opponents including Canada and Australia in friendly competitions.

She was named in the squad for the AFC Women's Asian Cup.

== Playing style ==
Teng is regarded as a composed defender with strong positional awareness. She is capable of operating across the defensive line and contributes through tackling, interceptions, and distribution from the back.

== Career statistics ==
=== Club ===
Season	Club	League	Apps	Goals
2025–26	Hang Yuan FC	Taiwanese women's league	2	0
Total			2	0

=== International ===
Year	Apps	Goals
2025	4	0
2026	0	0
Total	4	0

== Honours ==
Club

- No major honours recorded

International

- No major honours recorded

== See also ==
- Chinese Taipei women's national football team
- Sport in Taiwan
