= Miwa Tanaka =

Japanese footballer

Personal information
- Date of birth: 24 June 1998 (age 28)
- Place of birth: Kagoshima Prefecture, Japan
- Height: 1.57 m (5 ft 2 in)
- Position: Midfielder

Team information
- Current team: New Taipei Hang Yuen WFC
- Number: 11

Senior career*
Years	Team	Apps	(Gls)
2020-2022	Albirex Niigata Ladies	9	(0)
2023-	New Taipei Hang Yuen WFC		
- * Club domestic league appearances and goals

Miwa Tanaka (born 24 June 1998) is a Japanese professional footballer who plays as a midfielder for Taiwan Mulan Football League club New Taipei Hang Yuen WFC.

== Club career ==
Tanaka made her WE League debut on 31 October 2021.
