= Kaohsiung Nanzih Football Stadium =

Stadium in Nanzi, Kaohsiung, Taiwan

Kaohsiung Nanzih Football Stadium 高雄楠梓足球場
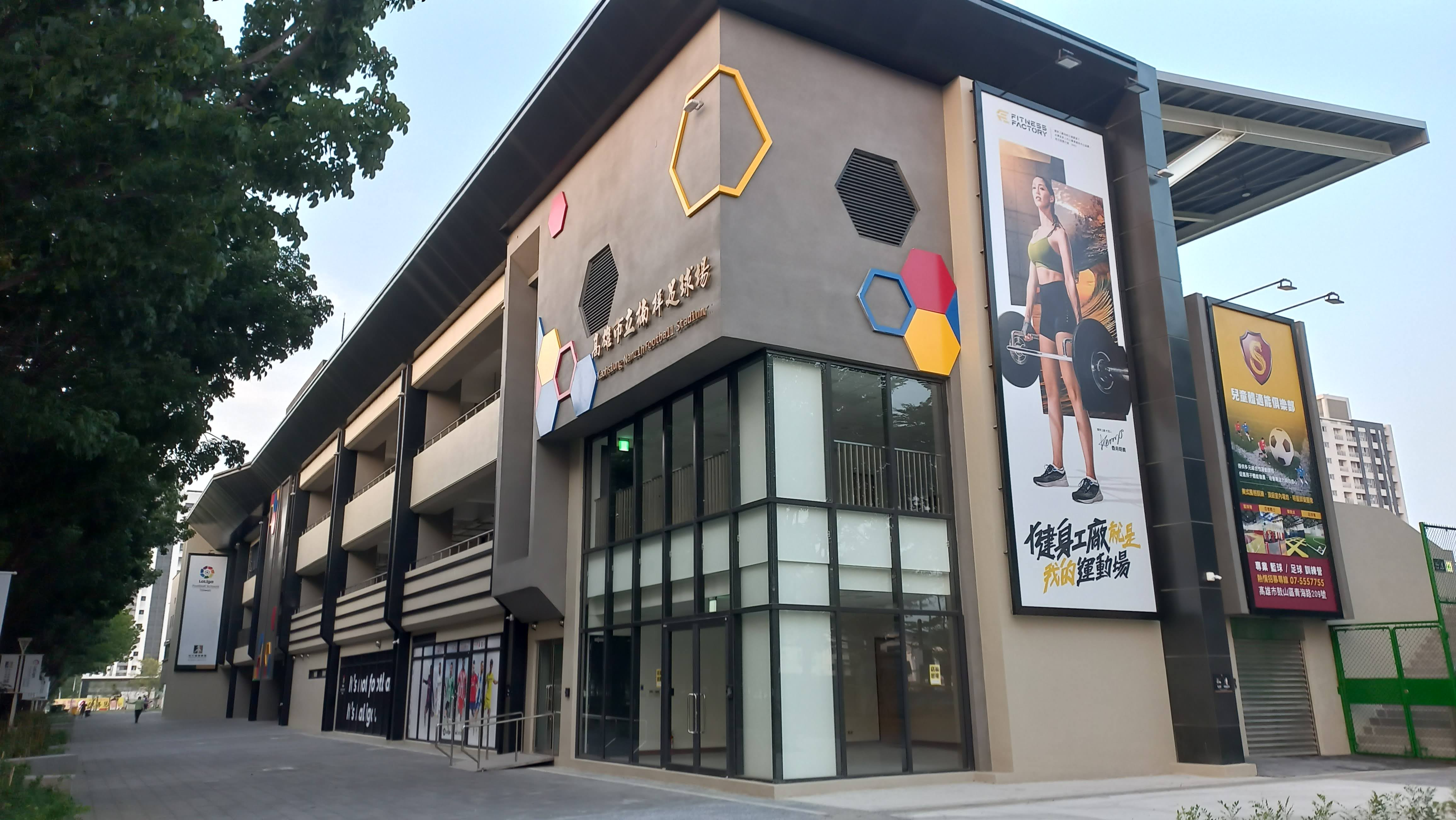
- Interactive map of Kaohsiung Nanzih Football Stadium 高雄楠梓足球場
- Location: Nanzih, Kaohsiung, Taiwan
- Coordinates: 22.7244°N 120.2869°E
- Owner: Kaohsiung City Government
- Operator: Fitness Factory
- Capacity: 1,200
- Surface: Grass
- Scoreboard: Yes

Construction
- Groundbreaking: May 7, 2020
- Opened: November 12, 2022
- Cost: NT$ 350 million

Tenants
- Taipower (2022–present); Kaohsiung Attackers (2022–present); Tainan City (selected matches); Chinese Taipei national football team (selected matches)

Kaohsiung Nanzih Football Stadium is a football stadium in Nanzih, Kaohsiung, Taiwan. The venue has two pitches (natural and artificial). It was built from 2020 and completed in 2022 with the cost of 350 million New Taiwan dollars, which drew criticism from the public.

The stadium hosted an international match between Chinese Taipei and Kyrgyzstan which Kyrgyzstan won 0-2. The stadium hosted the match was because both the Taipei Municipal Stadium and the National Stadium were unable to hold the match, which drew criticism against CTFA.

== International matches ==
=== Men ===
21 March 2024	Chinese Taipei	0–2	Kyrgyzstan	AFC 2026 FIFA World Cup Qualification Second Round
16:00 UTC+8		Report	Kichin 54' (pen.); Ka. Merk 80'	Attendance: 1,028; Referee: Yahya Al-Mulla (United Arab Emirates)
