= Yumi Uetsuji =

Japanese footballer (born 1987)

Yumi Uetsuji 上辻 佑実
Personal information
- Full name: Yumi Uetsuji
- Date of birth: November 30, 1987 (age 38)
- Place of birth: Suita, Osaka, Japan
- Height: 1.58 m (5 ft 2 in)
- Position: Midfielder

Team information
- Current team: Kaohsiung Attackers WFC
- Number: 17

Youth career
- Speranza FC Takatsuki

Senior career*
Years	Team	Apps	(Gls)
2003–2004	Speranza FC Takatsuki	16	(0)
2006–2011	TEPCO Mareeze	94	(11)
2011	Albirex Niigata	13	(2)
2012–2014	Vegalta Sendai	64	(17)
2015–2018	Nippon TV Beleza	56	(6)
2019–2020	Chifure AS Elfen Saitama	35	(6)
2021-2024	Omiya Ardija Ventus	41	(2)
2024–	Kaohsiung Attackers WFC		
Total		319	(44)

International career
2012–2015	Japan	4	(0)
Medal record
Albirex Niigata
Runner-up	Empress's Cup	2011
Nippon TV Beleza
Winner	Nadeshiko League	2015
Winner	Nadeshiko League	2016
Winner	Nadeshiko League	2017
Winner	Nadeshiko League	2018
Winner	Nadeshiko League Cup	2016
Winner	Nadeshiko League Cup	2018
Winner	Empress's Cup	2017
Winner	Empress's Cup	2018
Kaohsiung Attackers
Winner	Taiwan Mulan Football League	2024
- * Club domestic league appearances and goals as of September 8, 2024

Yumi Uetsuji (上辻 佑実, Uetsuji Yumi; born November 30, 1987) is a Japanese professional football player who plays for Kaohsiung Attackers WFC. She has previously also played for the Japan national team.

== Club career ==
Uetsuji was born in Suita on November 30, 1987. She played for her local club Speranza FC Takatsuki from 2003 to 2004. In 2006, she joined TEPCO Mareeze. However, the club was disbanded for Fukushima Daiichi nuclear disaster in 2011. In May, she moved to Albirex Niigata. In 2012, she moved to new club Vegalta Sendai. In 2015, she moved to Nippon TV Beleza. She played as regular player from 2015. However her opportunity to play decreased in 2018. In 2019, she moved to Chifure AS Elfen Saitama.

== National team career ==
On April 5, 2012, Uetsuji debuted for Japan national team against Brazil. She played 4 games for Japan until 2015.

== National team statistics ==
Japan national team
Year	Apps	Goals
2012	1	0
2013	0	0
2014	0	0
2015	3	0
Total	4	0
