= Minori Wakabayashi =

Taiwanese footballer (born 1993)

Personal information
- Date of birth: 1 June 1993 (age 33)
- Place of birth: Kanagawa Prefecture, Japan
- Height: 1.59 m (5 ft 3 in)
- Position: Defender

Team information
- Current team: Kaohsiung Attackers
- Number: 11

Youth career
- 2002–2005: Namiki
- 2004–2005: YSCC Cosmos
- 2006–2011: JFA Academy Fukushima

Senior career*
Years	Team	Apps	(Gls)
2012–2013	Albirex Niigata		
2012–2013	JEF United Chiba	123	(1)
2020–	Kaohsiung Attackers		

International career^{‡}
2026–	Chinese Taipei	1	(1)
- * Club domestic league appearances and goals ‡ National team caps and goals as of 14 September 2026

Minori Wakabayashi (若林 美里, Wakabayashi Minori; born 1 June 1993) is a professional footballer who plays as a defender for Kaohsiung Attackers. Born in Japan, she plays for the Chinese Taipei national team.

== Early life and education ==
Minori Wakabayashi was born on 1 June 1993 in the Kanagawa Prefecture, Japan. Her father was a footballer, and she took up the sport in elementary school which her male peers played.

She joined the JFA Academy Fukushima after finishing her elementary studies. After the 2011 Tōhoku earthquake and the Fukushima nuclear accident, the academy moved its students to the Gotemba, Shizuoka.

== Club career ==
After graduating from the JFA Academy Fukushima in the 2011, Wakabayashi joined Albirex Niigata of the Japan Women's Football League the following year. She later transferred to the JEF United Chiba.

Amidst the COVID-19 pandemic, Wakabayashi moved to Taiwan in 2020 to play for the Kaohsiung Attackers in the Taiwan Mulan Football League. In 2021, she became captain. She won the league MVP award in 2021 and 2024.

== International career ==
Minori Wakabayashi is a naturalized Taiwanese citizen since mid-2026, enabling her to play for the Chinese Taipei national team She debuted in Chinese Taipei's opening game in the 2026 Asian Games. She scored the second goal in the 81st minute in the 2–1 win against Vietnam on 14 September 2026.

== Career statistics ==
No.	Date	Venue	Opponent	Score	Result	Competition
1.	14 September 2026	Shizuoka Stadium, Fukuroi, Japan	Vietnam	2–0	2–1	2026 Asian Games
