= Silawan Intamee =

Thai footballer (born 1994)

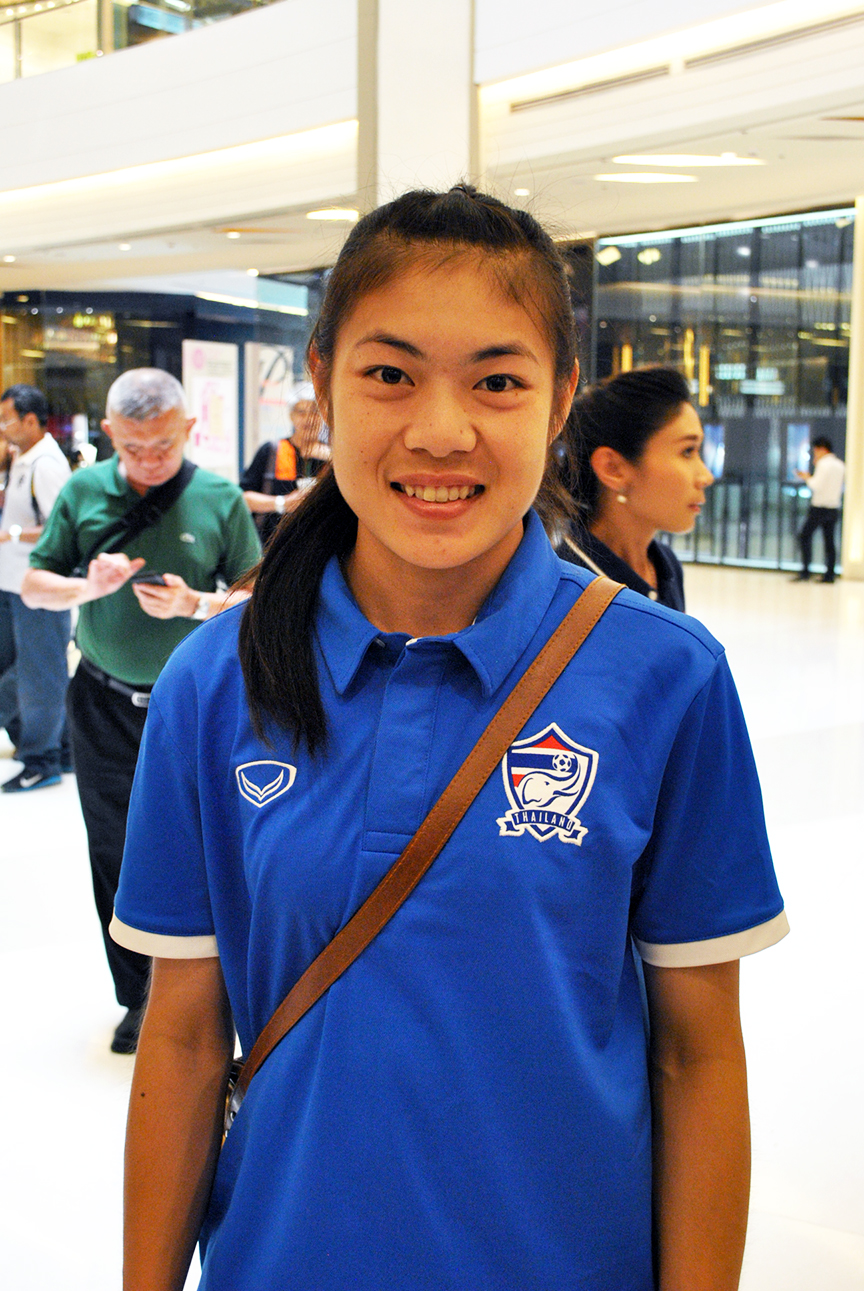

Personal information
- Full name: Silawan Intamee
- Date of birth: 22 January 1994 (age 32)
- Place of birth: Mae On, Chiang Mai, Thailand
- Height: 1.65 m (5 ft 5 in)
- Position: Midfielder

Senior career*
Years	Team	Apps	(Gls)
-2022	Chonburi		
2022	Taichung Blue Whale		
2022	Chonburi		
2023–2026	Taichung Blue Whale	13	(3)

International career^{‡}
2014–	Thailand	85	(15)
- * Club domestic league appearances and goals ‡ National team caps and goals as of 13:30, 12 June 2019 (UTC)

Silawan Intamee (Thai: ศิลาวรรณ อินต๊ะมี; born 22 January 1994) is a Thai professional footballer who plays as a midfielder.

== International goals ==
No.	Date	Venue	Opponent	Score	Result	Competition
1.	9 December 2017	Thunderdome Stadium, Nonthaburi, Thailand	Jordan	2–0	3–0	Friendly
2.	9 April 2018	King Abdullah II Stadium, Amman, Jordan	Jordan	3–0	6–1	2018 AFC Women's Asian Cup
3.	12 April 2018	King Abdullah II Stadium, Amman, Jordan	Philippines	3–0	3–1	2018 AFC Women's Asian Cup
4.	27 May 2018	Gelora Sriwijaya Stadium, Palembang, Indonesia	Indonesia	4–0	13–0	Friendly
5.	27 May 2018	Gelora Sriwijaya Stadium, Palembang, Indonesia	Indonesia	9–0	13–0	Friendly
6.	31 May 2018	Bumi Sriwijaya Stadium, Palembang, Indonesia	Indonesia	2–0	3–0	Friendly
7.	4 July 2018	Bumi Sriwijaya Stadium, Palembang, Indonesia	Cambodia	3–0	11–0	2018 AFF Women's Championship
8.	21 August 2019	IPE Chonburi Stadium, Chonburi, Thailand	Philippines	3–2	4–2	2019 AFF Women's Championship
9.	25 August 2019	IPE Chonburi Stadium, Chonburi, Thailand	Myanmar	3–0	3–1	2019 AFF Women's Championship
10.	2 December 2019	Rizal Memorial Stadium, Manila, Philippines	Indonesia	4–0	5–1	2019 Southeast Asian Games
11.	7 February 2020	Campbelltown Stadium, Sydney, Australia	China	1–6	1–6	2020 AFC Women's Olympic Qualifying Tournament
12.	25 September 2021	Faisal Al-Husseini International Stadium, Al-Ram, Palestine	Palestine	2–0	7–0	2022 AFC Women's Asian Cup qualification
13.	25 September 2021	Faisal Al-Husseini International Stadium, Al-Ram, Palestine	Palestine	5–0	7–0	2022 AFC Women's Asian Cup qualification
14.	18 May 2022	Cẩm Phả Stadium, Cẩm Phả, Vietnam	Philippines	1–0	3–0	2021 Southeast Asian Games
15.	4 December 2025	Chonburi Stadium, Chonburi, Thailand	Indonesia	3–0	8–0	2025 Southeast Asian Games
