= Kaohsiung Attackers =

Football club based in Kaohsiung, Taiwan

- Full name: Kaohsiung Attackers Football Club
- Founded: 2016; 10 years ago as Kaohshiung Sunny Bank; 2024; 2 years ago as Kaohshiung Attackers
- Ground: Kaohsiung Nanzih Football Stadium
- Capacity: 1,200
- League: Taiwan Mulan Football League
- Website: https://www.kaohsiungattackersfc.com/attackersfc/tw
Home colours	Away colours

Kaohsiung Attackers Football Club (Chinese: 高雄先鋒足球俱樂部, romanized: Gāoxióng Xiānfēng Zúqiú Jùlèbù) is a Taiwanese professional football club based in Kaohsiung.

It was known as Kaohsiung Sunny Bank (高雄陽信女子足球隊, Gāoxióng Yángxìn Nǚzǐ Zúqiú Duì) from 2016 to 2024.

== History ==
The Kaohsiung Attackers was established as the Kaohsiung Sunny Bank in 2016.

Power Wind Health Industry Co. in September 2022 gained management rights over the Kaohsiung Nanzih Football Stadium. The firm then took over the club's management in March 2023 and rebranded the club adopting its current name in 2024.

In 2025, a men's team was formed in partnership with the National University of Kaohsiung. The team entered the 2025–26 Taiwan Football League 2

== Current squad ==
=== Women's squad ===
As of 9 July 2026

Note: Flags indicate national team as defined under FIFA eligibility rules; some limited exceptions apply. Players may hold more than one non-FIFA nationality.

No.	Pos.	Nation	Player
1	GK	JPN	Yoshimi Miki (captain)
2	MF	TPE	Chang Chi-lan
4	DF	TPE	Pan Shin-yu
5	MF	JPN	Kirara Fujio
6	DF	TPE	Teng Pei-lin
7	MF	TPE	Liang Kai-jou
8	MF	TPE	Chan Pi-han
9	FW	BRA	Flavia Feliciano
10	FW	ESP	Martuka
11	DF	TPE	Minori Wakabayashi
13	MF	TPE	Lu Meng-fang

No.	Pos.	Nation	Player
14	MF	TPE	Wu Kai-ching
15	MF	TPE	Tseng Yun-ya
16	MF	TPE	Lan Yu-chieh
17	FW	BUL	Aleksandra Yaneva
18	GK	TPE	Cheng Wen-hsuan
19	DF	JPN	Mei Sugita
22	DF	TPE	Ting Chia-ying
23	FW	TPE	Ting Chi
28	DF	TPE	Wu Yen-yu
30	GK	TPE	Tsai Ming-fang
31	MF	TPE	Chuang Yung-hsin

=== Men's squad ===
==== First team ====
As of 18 August 2026

Note: Flags indicate national team as defined under FIFA eligibility rules; some limited exceptions apply. Players may hold more than one non-FIFA nationality.

No.	Pos.	Nation	Player
2	DF	KOR	Kwon Seung-seong
3	DF	RUS	Alim Zumakulov (captain)
4	DF	TPE	Hung Tzu-kuei
7	MF	JPN	Kotaro Shiba
8	FW	TPE	Chen Shih-hsien
9	FW	TPE	Jhon Benchy
10	MF	TPE	Kang Tae-won
11	FW	JPN	Genki Tateiwa
12	MF	TPE	Chen Kai-wen
13	FW	TPE	Huang Chao-chung
14	FW	GUA	Andy Ruiz
15	MF	TPE	Wang Hung-jui

No.	Pos.	Nation	Player
17	DF	PHI	Junell Bautista
20	FW	BRA	Luan Anderson
23	GK	TPE	Hsu Wei-hsiang
29	FW	JPN	Rintaro Hama
31	GK	TPE	Huang Meng-wei
36	MF	TPE	Tsai Yi-jui
55	DF	TPE	Wang Kuan-ju
70	FW	BRA	Otavio Neto
77	DF	TPE	Chuang Chia-wei
78	DF	TPE	Ling Wen-jui
99	GK	TPE	Tsai Yu-hsiang

==== Reserves team ====
As of 9 November 2026

Note: Flags indicate national team as defined under FIFA eligibility rules; some limited exceptions apply. Players may hold more than one non-FIFA nationality.

No.	Pos.	Nation	Player
8	MF	TPE	Chan Che-yuan
10	FW	TPE	Liu Ping-en
16	DF	TPE	Wang Po-hsin
19	DF	TPE	Yang Hsiang-yu
26	FW	TPE	Wang Hsiang-hsi

No.	Pos.	Nation	Player
47	DF	TPE	Cheng Chao-hsiang
52	DF	JPN	Yuu Yamada
69	DF	TPE	Chen Yi-wei (captain)
87	FW	TPE	Hu Sheng-wei
