= Saowalak Pengngam =

Thai football player

Personal information
- Full name: Saowalak Pengngam
- Date of birth: 30 November 1996 (age 29)
- Place of birth: Surin, Thailand
- Height: 1.66 m (5 ft 5 in)
- Position: Striker

Team information
- Current team: Taichung Blue Whale
- Number: 13

Senior career*
Years	Team	Apps	(Gls)
2024	Chonburi		
2024–	Taichung Blue Whale		

International career^{‡}
2017–	Thailand	20	(10)
- * Club domestic league appearances and goals ‡ National team caps and goals as of 01:45, 12 June 2019 (UTC)

Saowalak Pengngam (Thai: เสาวลักษณ์ เพ็งงาม; born 30 November 1996) is a Thai international footballer who plays as a striker for Taichung Blue Whale.

She participated at the 2018 Asian Games and 2019 FIFA Women's World Cup.

== International goals ==
No.	Date	Venue	Opponent	Score	Result	Competition
1.	20 August 2017	UM Arena Stadium, Shah Alam, Malaysia	Malaysia	5–0	6–0	2017 Southeast Asian Games
2.	27 May 2018	Gelora Sriwijaya Stadium, Palembang, Indonesia	Indonesia	10–0	13–0	Friendly
3.	27 May 2018	Gelora Sriwijaya Stadium, Palembang, Indonesia	Indonesia	11–0	13–0	Friendly
4.	27 May 2018	Gelora Sriwijaya Stadium, Palembang, Indonesia	Indonesia	12–0	13–0	Friendly
5.	8 June 2018	IPE Chonburi Stadium 1, Chonburi, Thailand	Malaysia	3–0	3–0	Friendly
6.	17 August 2019	IPE Chonburi Stadium 1, Chonburi, Thailand	Singapore	5–0	8–0	2019 AFF Women's Championship
7.	23 August 2019	IPE Chonburi Stadium 1, Chonburi, Thailand	Malaysia	1–0	7–0	2019 AFF Women's Championship
8.	23 August 2019	IPE Chonburi Stadium 1, Chonburi, Thailand	Malaysia	2–0	7–0	2019 AFF Women's Championship
9.	23 August 2019	IPE Chonburi Stadium 1, Chonburi, Thailand	Malaysia	4–0	7–0	2019 AFF Women's Championship
10.	23 August 2019	IPE Chonburi Stadium 1, Chonburi, Thailand	Malaysia	7–0	7–0	2019 AFF Women's Championship
11.	28 January 2020	Mandalar Thiri Stadium, Mandalay, Myanmar	Myanmar	1–1	1–1	Friendly
12.	15 July 2022	Rizal Memorial Stadium, Manila, Philippines	Myanmar	2–0	2–0	2022 AFF Women's Championship
13.	18 January 2023	BG Stadium, Pathum Thani, Thailand	Chinese Taipei	1–0	2–0	Friendly
14.	18 January 2023	BG Stadium, Pathum Thani, Thailand	Chinese Taipei	2–0	2–0	Friendly
15.	1 April 2023	Chonburi Stadium, Chonburi, Thailand	Singapore	3–0	6–0	2024 AFC Women's Olympic Qualifying Tournament
16.	1 April 2023	Chonburi Stadium, Chonburi, Thailand	Singapore	5–0	6–0	2024 AFC Women's Olympic Qualifying Tournament
17.	3 May 2023	RSN Stadium, Phnom Penh, Cambodia	Singapore	1–0	4–0	2023 Southeast Asian Games
18.	6 May 2023	RSN Stadium, Phnom Penh, Cambodia	Laos	2–0	6–0	2023 Southeast Asian Games
19.	12 May 2023	RCAF Old Stadium, Phnom Penh, Cambodia	Myanmar	1–0	2–4	2023 Southeast Asian Games
20.	15 May 2023	Olympic Stadium, Phnom Penh, Cambodia	Cambodia	1–0	6–0	2023 Southeast Asian Games
21.	15 May 2023	Olympic Stadium, Phnom Penh, Cambodia	Cambodia	3–0	6–0	2023 Southeast Asian Games
22.	13 August 2023	Tsing Yi Sports Ground, Tsing Yi, Hong Kong	Hong Kong	2–0	5–0	Friendly
23.	13 August 2023	Tsing Yi Sports Ground, Tsing Yi, Hong Kong	Hong Kong	4–0	5–0	Friendly
24.	5 April 2025	Yongchuan Sports Center, Chongqing, China	Zambia	3–2	3–2	2025 Yongchuan International Tournament
25.	26 June 2025	700th Anniversary Stadium, Chiang Mai, Thailand	Timor-Leste	1–0	4–0	2026 AFC Women's Asian Cup qualification
26.	26 June 2025	700th Anniversary Stadium, Chiang Mai, Thailand	Timor-Leste	2–0	4–0	2026 AFC Women's Asian Cup qualification
27.	26 June 2025	700th Anniversary Stadium, Chiang Mai, Thailand	Timor-Leste	3–0	4–0	2026 AFC Women's Asian Cup qualification
28.	2 July 2025	700th Anniversary Stadium, Chiang Mai, Thailand	Mongolia	2–0	11–0	2026 AFC Women's Asian Cup qualification
29.	24 October 2025	High Performance Training Center, Bangkok, Thailand	Bangladesh	2–0	3–0	Friendly
30.	27 October 2025	Chalerm Phrakiat Bang Mod Stadium, Bangkok, Thailand	Bangladesh	1–0	5–1	Friendly
31.	4 December 2025	Chonburi Stadium, Chonburi, Thailand	Indonesia	4–0	8–0	2025 Southeast Asian Games
