= Football at the 2002 Asian Games – Women's team squads =

Below are the squads for the women's football tournament at the 2002 Asian Games, played in Busan, South Korea.

== China ==
Coach: Ma Liangxing

No.	Pos.	Player	Date of birth (age)	Club
1	GK	Xiao Zhen	16 December 1976 (aged 25)	(China) Sichuan Jiannanchun
2	DF	Sun Rui	30 March 1978 (aged 24)	
3	DF	Li Jie	8 July 1979 (aged 23)	(China) Beijing Chengjian
4	DF	Gao Hongxia	7 December 1973 (aged 28)	(China) Shanghai STV
5	DF	Fan Yunjie	29 April 1972 (aged 30)	(China) Henan Lingrui
6	MF	Zhao Lihong	4 December 1972 (aged 29)	(China) Guangdong Haiyin
7	MF	Pu Wei	20 August 1980 (aged 22)	(China) Shanghai STV
8	FW	Bai Lili	29 October 1978 (aged 23)	(China) Shanghai STV
9	FW	Bai Jie	28 March 1972 (aged 30)	(United States) Washington Freedom
10	FW	Sun Wen	6 April 1973 (aged 29)	(United States) Atlanta Beat
11	MF	Xie Caixia	17 February 1976 (aged 26)	(China) Guangdong Haiyin
12	DF	Zhou Xiaoxia	13 October 1977 (aged 24)	(China) Guangdong Haiyin
13	FW	Meng Jun	11 March 1981 (aged 21)	(China) Bayi
14	DF	Bi Yan	17 February 1984 (aged 18)	(China) Dalian Shide
15	FW	Ren Liping	21 October 1978 (aged 23)	(China) Beijing Chengjian
16	DF	Liu Yali	9 February 1980 (aged 22)	(China) Hebei
17	MF	Pan Lina	18 July 1977 (aged 25)	(China) Shanghai STV
18	GK	Zhao Yan	7 May 1972 (aged 30)	(China) Shanghai STV

== Chinese Taipei ==
Coach: Chang Ming-hsien

No.	Pos.	Player	Date of birth (age)	Club
1	GK	Yang Tsu-chen		
2	DF	Chen Chiao-chuan		
3	DF	Hsueh Ya-lien		
4	DF	Chen Shu-chiung	22 August 1978 (aged 24)	
5	DF	Chen Chih-lan		
6	DF	Wang Mei-chuan		
7	MF	Hung Li-min		
8	MF	Chen Wei-ling	29 August 1981 (aged 21)	
9	MF	Huang Chun-lan	15 March 1979 (aged 23)	
10	MF	Chang Hui-chih	18 April 1983 (aged 19)	
11	FW	He Meng-hua		
12	FW	Lin Chi-i		
13	FW	Chen Ya-ling	23 September 1979 (aged 23)	
14	FW	Lee Ming-shu	22 March 1979 (aged 23)	
15	DF	Cheng Yu-hsing	27 July 1983 (aged 19)	
16	DF	Hsu Shu-fen		
17	MF	Liao Ying-wan		
18	GK	Huang Shou-mei		

== Japan ==
Coach: Eiji Ueda

No.	Pos.	Player	Date of birth (age)	Club
1	GK	Nozomi Yamago	16 February 1975 (aged 27)	(Japan) Saitama Reinas
2	DF	Yuka Miyazaki	13 October 1983 (aged 18)	(Japan) Iga Kunoichi
3	DF	Yoshie Kasajima	12 May 1975 (aged 27)	(Japan) Saitama Reinas
4	DF	Yasuyo Yamagishi	28 November 1979 (aged 22)	(Japan) Iga Kunoichi
5	MF	Tomoe Sakai	27 May 1978 (aged 24)	(Japan) Nippon TV Beleza
6	DF	Yumi Obe	15 February 1975 (aged 27)	(Japan) YKK Tohoku Flappers
7	FW	Yayoi Kobayashi	18 September 1981 (aged 21)	(Japan) Nippon TV Beleza
8	DF	Mai Nakachi	16 December 1980 (aged 21)	(Japan) Nippon TV Beleza
9	MF	Tomomi Miyamoto	31 December 1978 (aged 23)	(Japan) Iga Kunoichi
10	MF	Homare Sawa	6 September 1978 (aged 24)	(United States) Atlanta Beat
11	FW	Mio Otani	5 May 1979 (aged 23)	(Japan) Tasaki Perule
12	DF	Mai Aizawa	10 September 1980 (aged 22)	(Japan) Speranza Takatsuki
13	MF	Kanako Ito	20 July 1983 (aged 19)	(Japan) Nippon TV Beleza
14	FW	Mito Isaka	25 January 1976 (aged 26)	(Japan) Iga Kunoichi
15	MF	Naoko Kawakami	16 November 1977 (aged 24)	(Japan) Tasaki Perule
16	MF	Miyuki Yanagita	11 April 1981 (aged 21)	(Japan) Tasaki Perule
17	FW	Karina Maruyama	26 March 1983 (aged 19)	(Japan) Nippon Sport Science University
18	GK	Miho Fukumoto	2 October 1983 (aged 18)	(Japan) Okayama Yunogo Belle

== North Korea ==
Coach: Ri Song-gun

No.	Pos.	Player	Date of birth (age)	Club
1	GK	Ri Jong-hui	20 August 1975 (aged 27)	
2	DF	Yun In-sil	10 January 1976 (aged 26)	
3	FW	Jo Song-ok	18 March 1974 (aged 28)	
5	MF	Sin Kum-ok	25 November 1975 (aged 26)	
6	MF	Ra Mi-ae	8 December 1975 (aged 26)	
7	FW	Ri Kum-suk	16 August 1978 (aged 24)	
8	DF	Pak Kum-chun	22 February 1978 (aged 24)	
9	MF	Ho Sun-hui	5 March 1980 (aged 22)	
10	FW	Jin Pyol-hui	19 August 1980 (aged 22)	
11	FW	Yun Yong-hui	18 March 1977 (aged 25)	
12	MF	Jang Ok-gyong	29 January 1980 (aged 22)	
13	DF	Song Jong-sun	11 March 1981 (aged 21)	
14	FW	O Kum-ran	18 September 1981 (aged 21)	
15	MF	Ri Un-gyong	19 October 1980 (aged 21)	
17	DF	Yang Kyong-hui	21 January 1978 (aged 24)	
18	GK	Chon Kyong-hwa	7 August 1983 (aged 19)	
19	MF	Ri Hyang-ok	18 December 1977 (aged 24)	
20	MF	Kim Un-ok	18 April 1978 (aged 24)	

== South Korea ==
Coach: Lee Young-ki

No.	Pos.	Player	Date of birth (age)	Club
1	GK	Jung Ho-jung	11 May 1976 (aged 26)	(South Korea) INI Steel
2	DF	Kim Sang-hee	3 April 1983 (aged 19)	(South Korea) Ulsan College
3	MF	Park Kyung-sook	26 May 1980 (aged 22)	(South Korea) Soongmin Wonders
4	DF	Bae Jung-soo	11 October 1978 (aged 23)	(South Korea) Soongmin Wonders
5	MF	Lee Kyung-hee	17 July 1978 (aged 24)	(South Korea) Soongmin Wonders
6	DF	Jin Suk-hee	9 July 1978 (aged 24)	(South Korea) INI Steel
7	FW	Cha Sung-mi	23 November 1975 (aged 26)	(South Korea) INI Steel
8	MF	Hwang In-sun	2 February 1976 (aged 26)	(South Korea) INI Steel
9	FW	Kwak Mi-hee	30 August 1980 (aged 22)	(South Korea) INI Steel
10	MF	Lee Jang-mi	14 November 1985 (aged 16)	(South Korea) Janghowon High School
11	FW	Lee Ji-eun	16 December 1979 (aged 22)	(South Korea) Soongmin Wonders
12	MF	Jung Jung-suk	25 August 1982 (aged 20)	(South Korea) Ulsan College
13	DF	Lee Myung-hwa	29 July 1973 (aged 29)	(South Korea) INI Steel
14	FW	Yoo Hee-yeon	9 January 1982 (aged 20)	(South Korea) Kyung Hee University
15	MF	Park Eun-jung	4 November 1986 (aged 15)	(South Korea) Chungju Yesung Girls' High School
16	FW	Hong Kyung-suk	14 October 1984 (aged 17)	(South Korea) Gangil Girls' High School
17	MF	Han Song-i	28 July 1985 (aged 17)	(South Korea) Janghowon High School
18	GK	Kim Mi-jung	25 May 1978 (aged 24)	(South Korea) Soongmin Wonders

== Vietnam ==
Coach: (China) Jia Guangta

No.	Pos.	Player	Date of birth (age)	Club
1	GK	Nguyễn Thị Kim Hồng		(Vietnam) Thành Phố Hồ Chí Minh
2	DF	Bùi Thị Tuyết	23 October 1983 (aged 18)	(Vietnam) Than Việt Nam
4	MF	Quách Thanh Mai	19 April 1981 (aged 21)	(Vietnam) Hà Nội
5	DF	Nguyễn Thị Mai Lan		(Vietnam) Than Việt Nam
7	MF	Phùng Thị Minh Nguyệt		(Vietnam) Hà Nội
8	FW	Lưu Ngọc Mai	25 April 1974 (aged 28)	(Vietnam) Thành Phố Hồ Chí Minh
9	MF	Nguyễn Thị Thuý Nga		(Vietnam) Hà Nội
11	FW	Nguyễn Thị Hà		(Vietnam) Hà Nội
12	FW	Đỗ Thị Ngọc Châm		(Vietnam) Hà Nội
14	FW	Đoàn Thị Kim Chi	29 April 1979 (aged 23)	(Vietnam) Thành Phố Hồ Chí Minh
15	DF	Nguyễn Hồng Phúc		(Vietnam) Hà Nội
16	DF	Trần Thị Bích Hạnh		(Vietnam) Hà Nội
17	FW	Vũ Thị Tân	3 June 1983 (aged 19)	(Vietnam) Hà Nội
19	MF	Đào Thị Miện	17 July 1981 (aged 21)	(Vietnam) Hà Tây
24	GK	Vũ Tuyết Minh		(Vietnam) Hà Nội
26	DF	Từ Thị Phụ	5 November 1984 (aged 17)	(Vietnam) Quảng Ngãi
27	MF	Lê Thị Oanh	9 February 1984 (aged 18)	(Vietnam) Hà Tây
32	MF	Nguyễn Thị Hương	25 August 1983 (aged 19)	(Vietnam) Hà Nam
