= Football at the 2002 Asian Games =

Football tournament in South Korea

- Venues: Munsu Football Stadium; Masan Stadium; Gudeok Stadium; Yangsan Stadium; Changwon Stadium; Asiad Main Stadium
- Dates: 27 September – 13 October
- Competitors: 573 from 25 nations

Medalists
gold medal	Iran (men); North Korea (women)
silver medal	Japan (men); China (women)
bronze medal	South Korea (men); Japan (women)

Football at the 2002 Asian Games was held in Busan, Changwon, Yangsan and Ulsan, South Korea from 27 September to 13 October 2002.

Age limit for the men teams is under-23, same as the age limit in football competitions in Olympic Games, while three overage players are allowed among each squad.

== Venues ==
Busan		Ulsan
Asiad Main Stadium	Gudeok Stadium	Munsu Football Stadium
Capacity: 53,769	Capacity: 12,349	Capacity: 44,102
Changwon		Yangsan
Changwon Stadium	Masan Stadium	Yangsan Stadium
Capacity: 27,085	Capacity: 21,484	Capacity: 22,061

== Schedule ==
●	Round	●	Last round	P	Preliminary round	¼	Quarterfinals	½	Semifinals	F	Finals

Event↓/Date →	27th Fri	28th Sat	29th Sun	30th Mon	1st Tue	2nd Wed	3rd Thu	4th Fri	5th Sat	6th Sun	7th Mon	8th Tue	9th Wed	10th Thu	11th Fri	12th Sat	13th Sun
Men	P	P		P	P		P		P			¼		½			F
Women						●		●			●		●		●		

== Medalists ==
Event	Gold	Silver	Bronze
Men	Iran; Ebrahim Mirzapour; Mehdi Amirabadi; Yahya Golmohammadi; Saeid Lotfi; Javad Nekounam; Iman Mobali; Javad Kazemian; Ali Daei; Alireza Vahedi Nikbakht; Mehdi Rahmati; Hossein Kaebi; Moharram Navidkia; Abolfazl Hajizadeh; Mohsen Bayatinia; Ali Badavi; Siavash Akbarpour; Jalal Kameli Mofrad; Mohammad Nosrati; Hamid Azizzadeh; Ershad Yousefi	Japan; Yosuke Fujigaya; Teruyuki Moniwa; Shohei Ikeda; Daisuke Nasu; Yuichi Komano; Yuki Abe; Yoshito Okubo; Kazuyuki Morisaki; Daisuke Matsui; Ryoichi Maeda; Tatsuya Tanaka; Yuichi Nemoto; Keita Suzuki; Naohiro Ishikawa; Hikaru Mita; Takuya Nozawa; Hayuma Tanaka; Takaya Kurokawa; Satoshi Nakayama; Takeshi Aoki	South Korea; Lee Woon-jae; Cho Byung-kuk; Hyun Young-min; Park Yo-seb; Kim Young-chul; Park Yong-ho; Byun Sung-hwan; Kim Do-heon; Lee Chun-soo; Park Ji-sung; Choi Tae-uk; Lee Young-pyo; Kim Dong-jin; Park Kyu-seon; Cho Sung-hwan; Kim Yong-dae; Choi Sung-kuk; Kim Eun-jung; Park Dong-hyuk; Lee Dong-gook
Women	North Korea; Ri Jong-hui; Yun In-sil; Jo Song-ok; Sin Kum-ok; Ra Mi-ae; Ri Kum-suk; Pak Kum-chun; Ho Sun-hui; Jin Pyol-hui; Yun Yong-hui; Jang Ok-gyong; Song Jong-sun; O Kum-ran; Ri Un-gyong; Yang Kyong-hui; Chon Kyong-hwa; Ri Hyang-ok; Kim Un-ok	China; Xiao Zhen; Sun Rui; Li Jie; Gao Hongxia; Fan Yunjie; Zhao Lihong; Pu Wei; Bai Lili; Bai Jie; Sun Wen; Xie Caixia; Zhou Xiaoxia; Meng Jun; Bi Yan; Ren Liping; Liu Yali; Pan Lina; Zhao Yan	Japan; Nozomi Yamago; Yuka Miyazaki; Yoshie Kasajima; Yasuyo Yamagishi; Tomoe Sakai; Yumi Obe; Yayoi Kobayashi; Mai Nakachi; Tomomi Miyamoto; Homare Sawa; Mio Otani; Mai Aizawa; Kanako Ito; Mito Isaka; Naoko Kawakami; Miyuki Yanagita; Karina Maruyama; Miho Fukumoto

== Medal table ==
Rank	Nation	Gold	Silver	Bronze	Total
1	Iran (IRI)	1	0	0	1
1	North Korea (PRK)	1	0	0	1
3	Japan (JPN)	0	1	1	2
4	China (CHN)	0	1	0	1
5	South Korea (KOR)	0	0	1	1
Totals (5 entries)		2	2	2	6

== Draw ==
Group A

- South Korea
- Malaysia
- Maldives
- Oman

Group B

- United Arab Emirates
- Vietnam
- Yemen
- Thailand

Group C

- China
- India
- Bangladesh
- Turkmenistan

Group D

- Japan
- Uzbekistan
- Bahrain
- ~~Jordan~~*

Group E

- Iran
- Qatar
- Lebanon
- ~~Mongolia~~*

Group F

- Kuwait
- ~~Tajikistan~~*
- Hong Kong
- Pakistan

* Mongolia and Jordan withdrew from the competition and were replaced by Afghanistan and Palestine. Tajikistan was suspended by FIFA and was replaced by North Korea.

== Final standing ==
=== Men ===
Rank	Team	Pld	W	D	L	GF	GA	GD	Pts
1st place, gold medalist(s)	Iran	6	4	2	0	16	2	+14	14
2nd place, silver medalist(s)	Japan	6	5	0	1	13	4	+9	15
3rd place, bronze medalist(s)	South Korea	6	5	1	0	17	2	+15	16
4	Thailand	6	4	0	2	10	7	+3	12
5	China	4	3	0	1	9	1	+8	9
5	Kuwait	4	3	0	1	9	1	+8	9
7	Bahrain	4	2	0	2	10	6	+4	6
8	North Korea	4	2	0	2	7	4	+3	6
9	Oman	3	2	0	1	8	5	+3	6
10	India	3	2	0	1	6	3	+3	6
11	Qatar	3	1	2	0	13	2	+11	5
12	Lebanon	3	1	1	1	12	3	+9	4
13	United Arab Emirates	3	1	1	1	3	4	−1	4
14	Hong Kong	3	1	0	2	4	3	+1	3
15	Yemen	3	1	0	2	3	5	−2	3
16	Uzbekistan	3	1	0	2	2	4	−2	3
17	Malaysia	3	1	0	2	3	6	−3	3
18	Turkmenistan	3	1	0	2	4	8	−4	3
19	Vietnam	3	0	1	2	0	5	−5	1
20	Bangladesh	3	0	0	3	1	9	−8	0
21	Palestine	3	0	0	3	0	9	−9	0
22	Maldives	3	0	0	3	1	12	−11	0
23	Pakistan	3	0	0	3	0	14	−14	0
24	Afghanistan	3	0	0	3	0	32	−32	0

=== Women ===
Rank	Team	Pld	W	D	L	GF	GA	GD	Pts
1st place, gold medalist(s)	North Korea	5	4	1	0	8	0	+8	13
2nd place, silver medalist(s)	China	5	3	2	0	11	3	+8	11
3rd place, bronze medalist(s)	Japan	5	3	1	1	8	3	+5	10
4	South Korea	5	2	0	3	6	8	−2	6
5	Chinese Taipei	5	0	1	4	2	7	−5	1
6	Vietnam	5	0	1	4	2	16	−14	1
