= North Korea–South Korea football rivalry =

International football rivalry

Korean derby
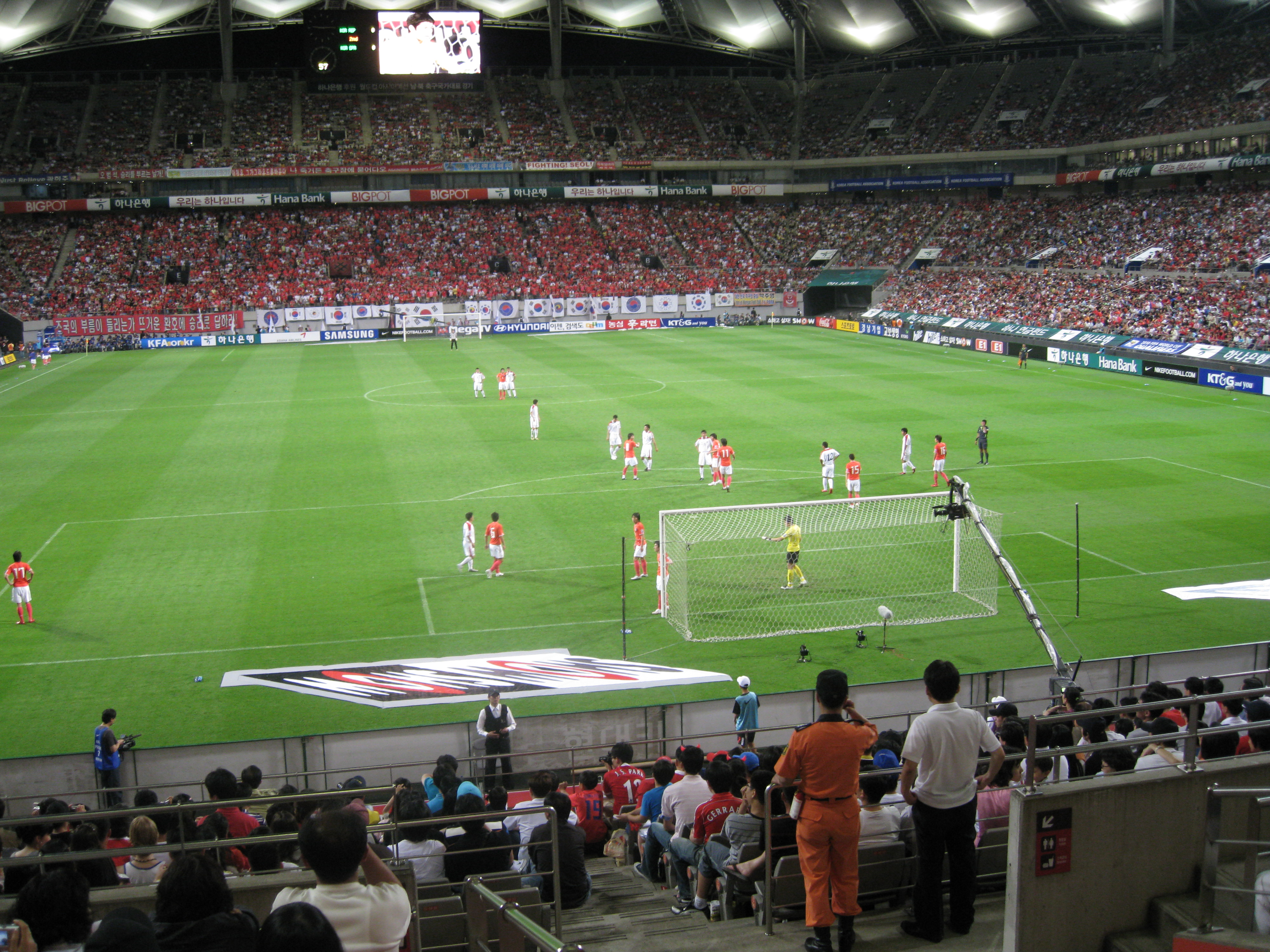
- Korea Republic vs Korea DPR, World Cup qualifying match at the Seoul World Cup Stadium, 22 June 2008
- Other names: South vs North
- Location: Asia (AFC); East Asia (EAFF)
- Teams: North Korea; South Korea

Gender		Men	Women
First meeting		22 December 1978; 1978 Asian Games; North Korea 0–0 South Korea	1 October 1990; 1990 Asian Games; North Korea 7–0 South Korea
Latest meeting		15 October 2019; 2022 FIFA World Cup qualification; North Korea 0–0 South Korea	29 October 2023; 2024 AFC Women's Olympic Qualifying Tournament; North Korea 0–0 South Korea
Meetings total		17	18
All-time series		North Korea: 1; South Korea: 7; Draw: 9	North Korea: 13; South Korea: 1; Draw: 4
Largest victory		28 October 1993; 1994 FIFA World Cup qualification; South Korea 3–0 North Korea	1 October 1990; 1990 Asian Games; North Korea 7–0 South Korea

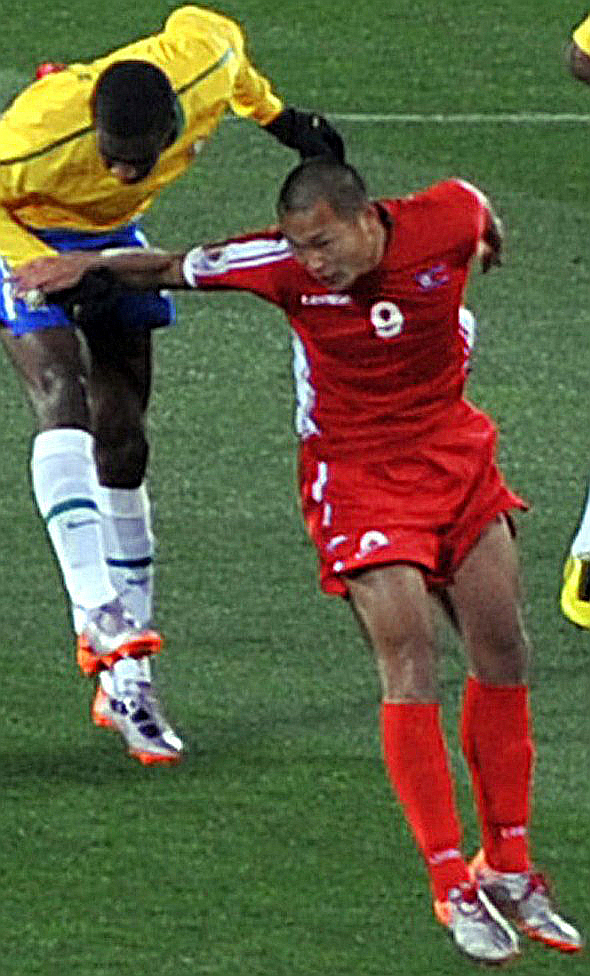
Jong Tae-se played for North Korean national team and South Korean club Suwon Samsung Bluewings.

The North Korean and South Korea national football teams have an established football rivalry, reflecting the political rivalry of their respective countries.

== History ==
=== Beginning ===
Along with troubled relations between North Korea and South Korea, their competitive spirit also appeared in association football. South Korean government made its anti-communist football club Yangzee to develop the national football team more than North Korea's level just after North Korea left with successful results in the 1966 FIFA World Cup by advancing to the quarter-finals, and the South Korean football team won the 1970 Asian Games due to its effort. The first Korean derby occurred in the 1978 Asian Games final, and both countries shared the title after a 0–0 draw without penalty shoot-out.

In the early 1990s, however, the relationship and bond between both sides got better, and their cultural exchange became brisk including football. The two Koreas got friendly football matches, and fielded a joint football team at the 1991 FIFA World Youth Championship.

=== 1994 World Cup qualification ===
Heading into the final qualifying match on 28 October 1993, South Korea was one point behind Japan (who defeated South Korea in the penultimate qualifier) and Saudi Arabia for one of the two Asian spots for the 1994 FIFA World Cup, while North Korea had already been eliminated. Goals from Ko Jeong-woon, Hwang Sun-hong and Ha Seok-ju in the second half gave South Korea a 3–0 win in the teams' final qualifying match for the 1994 World Cup. With Japan allowing a tying goal against Iraq late in its match, South Korea advanced to the 1994 World Cup on goal difference ahead of Japan.

=== 2002 World Cup ===
Following their final match of the last round of the AFC qualifiers for the 1994 World Cup, North Korea withdrew from international football for five years, and did not again attempt to qualify for the World Cup before the 2006 edition. During the 2002 FIFA World Cup, which South Korea co-hosted with Japan, and in which North Korea did not take part, the South's team reportedly had "supporters in the North", and North Korean newspaper The People's Korea published DPR Korea Football Association chairman Ri Gwang-gun's congratulations to his South Korean counterpart on the South's "great success in the World Cup", which he described as "a striking demonstration of the advantages and tenacity of the Korean nation to the world". Glyn Ford, an expert on East Asia, has noted that when North Koreans "can't support North Korea they'll support South Korea. They'd prefer South Korea to win against anyone else, unless they're playing them. They're cheering for Koreans."

=== 2010 World Cup ===
In 2008, on two occasions, a 2010 World Cup qualifying match between the two countries, due to be played in Pyongyang, had to be moved to Shanghai when authorities in the North refused to allow the South Korean national anthem to be played in Kim Il-sung Stadium, or the flag of South Korea to be flown. (North and South Korea have never granted each other formal diplomatic recognition.) When the teams met again the following year for a return game in Seoul, and the South won 1–0, the North's football association explained the defeat by accusing the South of having deliberately given food poisoning to several of its players.

During the 2010 FIFA World Cup, for which both Koreas qualified for the first time, it was reported that "at bars in central Seoul you could find groups of South Koreans cheering the North as loudly as their own team". South Korean captain Park Ji-sung stated: "I will watch the North Korean games. North Korea and South Korea speak the same language and actually we are the same country." In 2011, a poll revealed that an overwhelming majority of South Koreans backed the North's football team in their encounters against other countries; over 70% would support the North if it were to play against the United States, while only about 7% would support the U.S. in such a match. However, North Korean military provocations which happen occasionally are still an aggravating factor for South Koreans, and the tension between them continues whenever the derby is played.

North Korea failed to win over South Korea ever since its only victory in 1990. On the other hand, South Korea has only won once against North Korea in women's football, which was in a friendly match in 2005.

== Men's matches ==
1. 1978 Asian Games final
22 December 1978

South Korea	0–0 (a.e.t.)	North Korea
	Report

National Stadium, Bangkok
Attendance: 60,000

2. 1980 AFC Asian Cup semi-finals
28 September 1980

South Korea	2–1	North Korea
Chung Hae-won 80', 89'	Report	Pak Jong-hun 19' (pen.)

Sabah Al Salem Stadium, Kuwait City
Attendance: 20,000

3. 1990 FIFA World Cup qualification
16 October 1989

South Korea	1–0	North Korea
Hwang Sun-hong 18'	Report

National Stadium, Singapore
Referee: 15,000

4. 1990 Dynasty Cup
29 July 1990

South Korea	1–0	North Korea
Hwangbo Kwan 89'	Report

Workers' Stadium, Beijing
Attendance: 30,000

5–6. Friendly (Unification Football Series)
11 October 1990

North Korea	2–1	South Korea
Yun Jong-su 49'; Tak Young-bin 90'	Report	Kim Joo-sung 25'

Rungrado 1st of May Stadium, Pyongyang
Attendance: 150,000
23 October 1990

South Korea	1–0	North Korea
Hwang Sun-hong 25'	Report

Seoul Olympic Stadium, Seoul
Attendance: 70,000

7. 1992 Dynasty Cup
24 August 1992

South Korea	1–1	North Korea
Hong Myung-bo 22'	Report	Choi Yong-son 89'

Workers' Stadium, Beijing
Attendance: 60,000

8. 1994 FIFA World Cup qualification
28 October 1993

South Korea	3–0	North Korea
Ko Jeong-woon 49'; Hwang Sun-hong 53'; Ha Seok-ju 75'	Report

Qatar SC Stadium, Doha
Attendance: 4,000
Referee: Ion Crăciunescu (Romania)

Both Koreas advanced to the final round of the Asian Football Confederation qualifiers for the 1994 FIFA World Cup. They met on 28 October 1993, for what was to be their last encounter for over a decade. The South beat the North 3–0 and qualified, while North Korea finished last of the final round, prompting its temporary withdrawal from international football. Over the following two years, North Korea experienced the death of its leader, Kim Il-Sung, and the beginning of a severe famine.

9. 2005 EAFF Championship
4 August 2005
20:00

South Korea	0–0	North Korea
	Report

World Cup Stadium, Jeonju
Attendance: 27,455
Referee: Ghahremani Mohsen (I.R. Iran)

Both Koreas advanced to the final tournament of the 2005 East Asian Football Championship, along with Japan and the P.R. China. The encounter between the two Koreas was a goalless draw. It was their first encounter since 1993.

10. 2008 EAFF Championship
20 February 2008
20:45

North Korea	1–1	South Korea
Jong Tae-se 72'	Report	Yeom Ki-hun 20'

Olympic Sports Center, Chongqing
Attendance: 20,000
Referee: Hiroshi Takayama (Japan)

Both Koreas advanced to the finals group of the 2008 East Asian Football Championship in Chongqing, People's Republic of China. Their encounter was a draw.

11–14. 2010 FIFA World Cup qualification
26 March 2008
19:00

North Korea	0–0	South Korea
	Report

Shanghai Stadium, Shanghai
Attendance: 20,000
Referee: Saad Al Fadhli (Kuwait)
22 June 2008
20:00

South Korea	0–0	North Korea
	Report

World Cup Stadium, Seoul
Attendance: 48,519
Referee: Subkhiddin Mohd Salleh (Malaysia)
10 September 2008
20:00

North Korea	1–1	South Korea
Hong Yong-jo 64' (pen.)	Report	Ki Sung-yueng 69'

Hongkou Football Stadium, Shanghai
Attendance: 3,000
Referee: Muhsen Basma (Syria)
1 April 2009
20:00

South Korea	1–0	North Korea
Kim Chi-woo 86'	Report

World Cup Stadium, Seoul
Attendance: 48,000
Referee: Abdullah Al Hilali (Oman)

In the Asian Football Confederation qualifiers, North Korea advanced to the third round by defeating Mongolia 9–2 on aggregate, while South Korea was an automatic qualifier for that round, by virtue of being a top seed. The two Koreas were drawn together in group 3, from which they both qualified, eliminating Jordan and Turkmenistan. In round four, the two countries were again drawn together, in group B, and again topped their group together, thus both qualifying for the World Cup. In both rounds, as mentioned above, North Korea's home matches were moved to Shanghai due to the North refusing to allow the South's anthem and flag to appear in its home stadium. The first three games were draws; the South won the fourth, amidst accusations of food poisoning from the North.

15. 2015 EAFF Championship
9 August 2015
17:10 UTC+8

South Korea	0–0	North Korea
	Report

Wuhan Sports Center Stadium, Wuhan
Referee: Alireza Faghani (Iran)

16. 2017 EAFF Championship
12 December 2017
16:30

North Korea	0–1	South Korea
	Report	Ri Yong-chol 64' (o.g.)

Ajinomoto Stadium, Chōfu
Attendance: 5,477
Referee: Hettikamkanamge Perera (Sri Lanka)

17. 2022 FIFA World Cup qualification
15 October 2019

North Korea	0–0	South Korea
	Report

Kim Il-sung Stadium, Pyongyang
Attendance: 100
Referee: Abdulrahman Al-Jassim (Qatar)

North Korea and South Korea were once again grouped together in group H of the second round of 2022 FIFA World Cup and 2023 AFC Asian Cup qualifications. On 15 October 2019, the rivals met in Pyongyang, North Korea, for the first time in 29 years, in an empty stadium. However, the return fixture, supposed to be held in Seoul, was unable to take part due to COVID-19 pandemic, which North Korea withdrew from the qualification, thus disqualified the country from the 2022 FIFA World Cup and 2023 AFC Asian Cup.

== Women's matches ==
1. 1990 Asian Games
1 October 1990

North Korea	7–0	South Korea
Ri Hong-sil 3'; Ju Jeong-ae 14', 46'; Yang Mi-soon 21'; Ri Kyong-ae 38'; Ri Keum-hwa 40', 42'	Report

Beijing

2. 1993 AFC Women's Championship Group A
7 December 1993

South Korea	0–3	North Korea
	Report	Cho Jong-ran 24'; Ri Kyong-ae 40', 61'

Kuching

3. 2002 Asian Games
9 October 2002
19:00

North Korea	2–0	South Korea
Ri Hyang-ok 26'; Jin Pyol-hui 36'	Report

Gudeok Stadium, Busan

North and South Korea met at the 2002 Asian Games, with the North defeating the South and going on to win the competition.

4. 2003 AFC Women's Championship Group A
16 June 2003
16:00

North Korea	2–2	South Korea
Yun Yong-hui 39'; Jin Pyol-hui 77'	Report	Lee Ji-eun 19'; Hwang In-sun 43'

Rajamangala Stadium, Bangkok
Attendance: 1,500
Referee: Bentla D'Coth (India)

North and South Korea were drawn together in group A in the first round of the 2003 AFC Women's Championship, which also served as a qualifier for the 2003 FIFA Women's World Cup. The game ended in a draw, but both Koreas advanced from the group. The North went on to win the Championship, and the two countries qualified for the World Cup.

5. 2004 Summer Olympics qualification
26 April 2004
15:45

North Korea	5–1	South Korea
Seok Cheon-myung 2'; Ri Kum-suk 32'; Ri Hyang-ok 40', 71'; O Kum-ran 88'	Report	Park Eun-sun 39'

Hiroshima Big Arch, Hiroshima
Attendance: 1,215
Referee: Mayumi Oiwa (Japan)

The two Koreas met in Hiroshima in April 2004 during the qualifiers for the 2004 Summer Olympics women's football competition, for which neither of them ultimately qualified. The North won the match with a four-goal margin.

6. 2005 EAFF Women's Championship
4 August 2005

South Korea	1–0	North Korea
Park Eun-jung 77'	Report

Jeonju World Cup Stadium, Jeonju
Attendance: 12,000

On 4 August 2005, the two Koreas' men's teams were meeting in the final tournament of the 2005 East Asian Football Championship, in Jeonju, in the South. On the same day, a match between the two countries' women's teams was held, albeit not as part of the tournament. While the men's match resulted in a draw, the women's resulted in South Korea's first (and so far only) victory over the North.

7. 2006 AFC Women's Asian Cup Group B
24 July 2006
14:30

North Korea	1–0	South Korea
Kim Yong-ae 76'	Report

Hindmarsh Stadium, Adelaide
Attendance: 300
Referee: Pannipar Kamnueng (Thailand)

North and South were drawn together in group B of the 2006 Asian Cup in Adelaide, Australia. They met in their final match, both still with hopes of advancing. The North won by a single goal, topping the group and advancing, while the South was eliminated. North Korea would go on to win the Cup.

8. 2006 Asian Games Group B
7 December 2006
17:15

North Korea	4–1	South Korea
Ri Kum-suk 10', 17'; Kim Kyong-hwa 12'; Ri Un-gyong 70'	Report	Park Hee-young 25'

Umm-Affai Stadium, Al-Rayyan
Referee: Bentla D'Coth (India)

North and South Korea were drawn together in group B at the 2006 Asian Games in Al-Rayyan, Qatar. The North won the match, but both countries advanced, eliminating Chinese Taipei and Vietnam.

9. 2008 EAFF Women's Championship
24 February 2008
17:00

South Korea	0–4	North Korea
	Report	Kim Yong-ae 53', 78'; Hong Myong-gum 68'; Ri Kum-suk 69'

Yongchuan Stadium, Chongqing
Attendance: 25,000
Referee: Baba Sachiko (Japan)

Both Koreas qualified for the finals group of the 2008 East Asian Football Championship in Chongqing, China. The North defeated the South by a four-goal margin.

10. 2010 Asian Games semi-finals
20 November 2010
19:00

South Korea	1–3 (a.e.t.)	North Korea
Yoo Young-a 88'	Report	Jo Yun-mi 45+1'; Ra Un-sim 94', 119'

Tianhe Stadium, Guangzhou
Referee: Jacqui Melksham (Australia)

The two Koreas met in the semi finals of the 2010 Asian Games in Guangzhou, China. A 1–1 draw led to the match being extended, whereupon two goals by Ra Un Sim enabled the North to advance to the final.

11. 2012 Summer Olympics qualification
5 September 2011
15:30

South Korea	2–3	North Korea
Lee Hyun-young 5'; Jo Yun-mi 62' (o.g.)	Report	Ra Un-sim 9'; Choe Mi-gyong 28'; Hwang Song-mi 57'

Jinan Olympic Sports Center, Jinan
Attendance: 417
Referee: Albon Teodora (Romania)

The two Koreas were among the six teams to meet in the final round of the women's Asian qualifiers for the 2012 Summer Olympics. They played one match against each other, in Jinan, China. The North's 3–2 victory helped it to qualify in second place for the Olympics, while the South was ultimately eliminated, finishing fifth.

12. 2013 EAFF Women's Championship
21 July 2013
18:15

South Korea	1–2	North Korea
Kim Soo-yun 26'	Report	Ho Un-byol 36', 38'

Seoul World Cup Stadium, Seoul
Attendance: 6,530
Referee: Pannipar Kamnueng (Thailand)

The two countries met in the final round, which was a round-robin tournament between the two Koreas, Japan and China. North Korea beat the South and China, drew against Japan, and won the Cup. After its loss to the North, South Korea beat Japan but lost to China, and finished third.

13. 2014 Asian Games semi-finals
29 September 2014
20:00

South Korea	1–2	North Korea
Jung Seol-bin 12'	Report	Ri Ye-gyong 36'; Ho Un-byol 90+3'

Incheon Munhak Stadium
Referee: Jia Wang (China)

14. 2015 EAFF Women's Championship
8 August 2015
17:10 UTC+8

South Korea	0–2	North Korea
	Report	Yun Song-mi 22'; Ra Un-sim 52'

Wuhan Sports Center Stadium, Wuhan
Referee: Casey Reibelt (Australia)

15. 2016 AFC Women's Olympic Qualifying Tournament
29 February 2016
19:35 UTC+9

North Korea	1–1	South Korea
Kim Un-ju 80'	Report	Jung Seol-bin 32'

Nagai Stadium, Osaka
Attendance: 2,000
Referee: Stéphanie Frappart (France)

16. 2018 AFC Women's Asian Cup qualification
7 April 2017
15:00 UTC+8:30

South Korea	1–1	North Korea
Jang Sel-gi 76'	Report	Sung Hyang-sim 45+3'

Kim Il-sung Stadium, Pyongyang
Attendance: 42,500
Referee: Casey Reibelt (Australia)

With North Korea hosting the qualification phase, South Korean team had to travel north, meaning for the first time since 1990, a senior team from the South to play against the North in North Korea. Heading to the qualifiers' expected encounter, North Korea had beaten India and Hong Kong while South Korea had just played its first match, a 10–0 win over India. The North Korean government allowed supporters to enter the stadium for this meeting, and this gave the North a major boost, ultimately resulting in the first half injury time goal by Sung Hyang-sim. However, South Korea had proven to be different than previous encounters, when a strictly disciplined Southern defence prevented the North from scoring a second. Not just that, Jang Sel-gi turned to become the heroine as she scored the decisive goal in 76', ultimately helped the South to draw the North 1–1. Despite failing to win, this draw proved to be the difference, as South Korea managed to overcome North Korea by goal differences with three more goals scored than the North, ultimately condemned North Korea to second and denied North Korea a place in the 2018 AFC Women's Asian Cup. South Korea would go on to qualify for the 2019 FIFA Women's World Cup.

17. 2022 Asian Games quarter-finals
30 September 2023
16:30 UTC+8

South Korea	1–4	North Korea
An Myong-song 11' (o.g.)		Ri Hak 20', 90'; An Myong-song 81'; Kim Kyong-yong 90+5'

Wenzhou Sports Centre Stadium, Wenzhou
Attendance: 7,217
Referee: Chaisanit Pansa (Thailand)

18. 2024 AFC Women's Olympic Qualifying Tournament
29 October 2023
15:30 UTC+8

North Korea	0–0	South Korea
	Report

Xiamen Egret Stadium, Xiamen
Attendance: 7,582
Referee: Lê Thị Ly (Vietnam)

== See also ==
- North Korea national football team results
- South Korea national football team records and statistics
- North Korea women's national football team
- South Korea women's national football team
- Yangzee FC
- Korea national under-20 football team
- Kyungsung FC–Pyongyang FC rivalry
