= 2003 AFC Women's Championship =

ฟุตบอลหญิงชิงแชมป์เอเชีย 2546

Tournament details
- Host country: Thailand
- Dates: 8–21 June
- Teams: 14 (from 1 confederation)
- Venues: 2 (in 2 host cities)

Final positions
- Champions: North Korea (2nd title)
- Runners-up: China
- Third place: South Korea
- Fourth place: Japan

Tournament statistics
- Matches played: 30
- Goals scored: 184 (6.13 per match)
- Top scorer(s): (North Korea) Ri Kum-suk (15 goals)

The 2003 AFC Women's Championship was a women's football tournament held in Thailand from 8 to 21 June 2003. It was the 14th edition of the AFC Women's Championship, a tournament for women's national teams from countries affiliated with the Asian Football Confederation.

The competition was held in Bangkok in the Rajamangala Stadium and in Nakhon Sawan in the Nakhon Sawan Stadium. The tournament was won by the defending champions North Korea women's national football team (Korea DPR). As the championship was also used for qualifying for the FIFA Women's World Cup, North Korea qualified as champions, China qualifying as runners-up, and South Korea qualifying as the third-placed team. Japan as the fourth-placed team faced another match for qualification.

== Participating teams and structure ==
Fourteen teams took part in the competition. This included the hosts Thailand and the defending champions North Korea. The teams were split into 3 groups, with the each team playing all the others in the group in a round robin format. At the end of the group stage the four teams with the best results from all the groups who qualified in the 1st 2 spaces in each group qualify to the knockout stage. This is played in the format of a semi-final, a 3rd/4th place match, as well as a final.

The winners and runners-up of the competition automatically qualify for the 2003 FIFA Women's World Cup. The 3rd place team has to compete against a CONCACAF team over home and away matches for a final place in the FIFA Women's World Cup. The runners-up and the 3rd place team were re-berthed to 3rd and 4th place respectively as China, as original host of the World Cup and would automatically qualified to final rounds, got 2nd place.

This was the last tournament to still issue invitation. From 2006, a separate qualification round was introduced to find out teams to qualify for the Women's Asian Cup.

- China
- Chinese Taipei
- Guam
- Hong Kong
- India
- Japan
- North Korea
- South Korea
- Myanmar
- Philippines
- Singapore
- Thailand
- Uzbekistan
- Vietnam

== Venues ==
Bangkok	Nakhon Sawan
Rajamangala Stadium	Nakhon Sawan Stadium
Capacity: 65,000	Capacity: 15,000
2003 AFC Women's Championship is located in Thailand

== Group stage ==
=== Group A ===
Team	Pld	W	D	L	GF	GA	GD	Pts
North Korea	4	3	1	0	45	2	+43	10
South Korea	4	3	1	0	20	2	+18	10
Thailand	4	2	0	2	6	21	−15	6
Hong Kong	4	1	0	3	2	24	−22	3
Singapore	4	0	0	4	0	24	−24	0

Source: RSSSF
8 June 2003
19:00

Singapore	0–3	Thailand
	Report	Kitiya 17'; Saranya 20'; Anootsara 63'

Rajamangala Stadium, Bangkok
Attendance: 2,000
Referee: Zhang Dongqing (China)
8 June 2003
21:15

South Korea	8–0	Hong Kong
Sung Hyun-ah 1'; Lee Ji-eun 23', 46'; Lee Myung-hwa 59'; Park Eun-sun 62', 65', 78', 89'	Report

Rajamangala Stadium, Bangkok
Attendance: 5,000
Referee: Bentla D'Coth (India)

10 June 2003
16:00

South Korea	6–0	Thailand
Hwang In-sun 23'; Kim Jin-hee 34'; Lee Ji-eun 52', 86'; Park Eun-sun 64', 79'	Report

Rajamangala Stadium, Bangkok
Attendance: 400
Referee: Mayumi Oiwa (Japan)
10 June 2003
18:15

North Korea	13–0	Hong Kong
Ra Mi-ae 1'; Ri Kum-suk 4', 24', 33', 37', 75', 84'; Yun Yong-hui 11', 21'; Ri Un-gyong 22', 90+2'; Ho Sun-hui 58'; Jin Pyol-hui 88'	Report

Rajamangala Stadium, Bangkok
Attendance: 250
Referee: Sachiko Yamagishi (Japan)

12 June 2003
16:00

South Korea	4–0	Singapore
Park Eun-sun 7'; Cha Sung-mi 10', 20'; Shin Sun-nam 61'	Report

Rajamangala Stadium, Bangkok
Attendance: 200
Referee: Deng Junxia (China)
12 June 2003
18:15

North Korea	14–0	Thailand
Jin Pyol-hui 9', 26', 41', 48'; Ri Un-gyong 20'; Ri Kum-suk 31', 37', 43', 57'; Ra Mi-ae 51'; Yun Yong-hui 64', 83'; Ri Un-suk 75'	Report

Rajamangala Stadium, Bangkok
Attendance: 500
Referee: Sachiko Baba (Japan)

14 June 2003
16:00

Hong Kong	1–3	Thailand
Yau Ka Wai 54'	Report	Chownee 80'; Pranee 90'; Hathairat 90+1'

Rajamangala Stadium, Bangkok
Attendance: 200
Referee: Mayumi Oiwa (Japan)
14 June 2003
18:15

North Korea	16–0	Singapore
Jin Pyol-hui 9', 22', 31'; Ho Sun-hui 15', 48'; Ri Kum-suk 17'; Pak Kum-chun 27', 59', 72'; Ri Un-suk 35'; Pak Kyong-sun 41', 60'; Sin Kum-ok 56'; Jang Ok-gyong 57'; Ri Hyang-ok 74'; O Kum-ran 80'	Report

Rajamangala Stadium, Bangkok
Attendance: 200
Referee: Bentla D'Coth (India)

16 June 2003
16:00

North Korea	2–2	South Korea
Yun Yong-hui 39'; Jin Pyol-hui 77'	Report	Lee Ji-eun 19'; Hwang In-sun 43'

Rajamangala Stadium, Bangkok
Referee: Bentla D'Coth (India)
16 June 2003
18:15

Hong Kong	1–0	Singapore
Ng Wing Kum 7'	Report

Rajamangala Stadium, Bangkok
Referee: Sachiko Yamagishi (Japan)

=== Group B ===
Team	Pld	W	D	L	GF	GA	GD	Pts
Japan	4	4	0	0	34	0	+34	12
Myanmar	4	2	1	1	11	8	+3	7
Chinese Taipei	4	2	1	1	7	7	0	7
Philippines	4	1	0	3	2	26	−24	3
Guam	4	0	0	4	2	15	−13	0

Source: RSSSF
9 June 2003
16:00

Japan	15–0	Philippines
Otani 8', 10', 33', 45', 53', 74', 77'; Arakawa 9'; Kobayashi 17', 58'; Miyazaki 35'; Sawa 41'; Miyamoto 60'; Miyama 75'; Sakai 76'	Report

Rajamangala Stadium, Bangkok
Attendance: 2,000
Referee: Deng Junxia (China)
9 June 2003
18:15

Guam	1–2	Chinese Taipei
Flores 7'	Report	Chen Shu-chiung 43'; Ho Meng-ting 69'

Rajamangala Stadium, Bangkok
Attendance: 100
Referee: Sin Hwa Youen (South Korea)

11 June 2003
16:00

Philippines	0–6	Myanmar
	Report	San San Kyu 8', 46'; Aye Nandar Hlaing 34', 47'; Moe Moe War 78'; Callejas 86' (o.g.)

Rajamangala Stadium, Bangkok
Attendance: 100
Referee: Bentla D'Coth (India)
11 June 2003
18:15

Japan	7–0	Guam
Sakai 19'; Sawa 23', 48'; Maruyama 27', 64', 85'; Yano 78'	Report

Rajamangala Stadium, Bangkok
Attendance: 200
Referee: Zhang Dongqing (China)

13 June 2003
16:00

Philippines	0–4	Chinese Taipei
	Report	Wu Hsin-jung 4'; Lin Yu-hui 23', 36'; Huang Chun-lan 41'

Rajamangala Stadium, Bangkok
Attendance: 200
Referee: Zhang Dongqing (China)
13 June 2003
18:15

Japan	7–0	Myanmar
Otani 2', 20'; Kobayashi 22', 88'; Sawa 50'; Isozaki 71'; Maruyama 87'	Report

Rajamangala Stadium, Bangkok
Attendance: 200
Referee: Ri Hong Sil (North Korea)

15 June 2003
16:00

Guam	0–4	Myanmar
	Report	Aye Nandar Hlaing 39'; Zin Mar Wann 46'; Thu Zar Htwe 77'; Hla Hla Thant 79'

Rajamangala Stadium, Bangkok
Attendance: 500
Referee: Deng Junxia (China)
15 June 2003
18:15

Japan	5–0	Chinese Taipei
Sawa 62', 83'; Kobayashi 72'; Maruyama 74'; Huang Feng-chiu 78' (o.g.)	Report

Rajamangala Stadium, Bangkok
Attendance: 700
Referee: Im Eun Ju (South Korea)

17 June 2003
16:00

Chinese Taipei	1–1	Myanmar
Cheng Yu-hsin 17'	Report	Huang Feng-chiu 31' (o.g.)

Rajamangala Stadium, Bangkok
Attendance: 100
Referee: Ri Hong Sil (North Korea)
17 June 2003
18:15

Philippines	2–1	Guam
Loren 32'; Penales 70'	Report	Santos 24'

Rajamangala Stadium, Bangkok
Attendance: 200
Referee: Deng Junxia (China)

=== Group C ===
Team	Pld	W	D	L	GF	GA	GD	Pts
China	3	3	0	0	29	0	+29	9
Vietnam	3	2	0	1	6	9	−3	6
India	3	1	0	2	7	14	−7	3
Uzbekistan	3	0	0	3	2	21	−19	0

Source: RSSSF
9 June 2003
16:00

China	6–0	Vietnam
Teng Wei 3', 29'; Sun Wen 8'; Liu Ying 55', 63'; Han Duan 75'	Report

Nakhon Sawan Stadium, Nakhon Sawan
Attendance: 3,000
Referee: Im Eun Ju (South Korea)
9 June 2003
18:15

India	6–0	Uzbekistan
Rani Chanu 15'; Maichon Devi 20'; Robita Devi 40'; Kar 47'; Tababi Devi 72', 76'	Report

Nakhon Sawan Stadium, Nakhon Sawan
Attendance: 1,000
Referee: Ri Hong Sil (North Korea)

11 June 2003
16:00

Vietnam	4–2	Uzbekistan
Lưu Ngọc Mai 19', 24', 37', 77'	Report	Kosimova 57'; Abdurasulova 85'

Nakhon Sawan Stadium, Nakhon Sawan
Attendance: 1,500
Referee: Sin Hwa Youen (South Korea)
11 June 2003
18:15

China	12–0	India
Bai Jie 9', 20', 26', 74', 79'; Sun Wen 22', 63', 67', 88', 90+1'; Zhao Lihong 56'; Liu Ying 61'	Report

Nakhon Sawan Stadium, Nakhon Sawan
Attendance: 800
Referee: Mayumi Oiwa (Japan)

13 June 2003
16:00

Vietnam	2–1	India
Lưu Ngọc Mai 9'; Đoàn Thị Kim Chi 55'	Report	Kar 60'

Nakhon Sawan Stadium, Nakhon Sawan
Attendance: 1,000
Referee: Im Eun Ju (South Korea)
13 June 2003
18:15

China	11–0	Uzbekistan
Teng Wei 3', 40', 47'; Han Duan 13', 42'; Ren Liping 23', 60'; Gao Hongxia 48'; Qu Feifei 52'; Pu Wei 53'; Zhou Xiaoxia 76'	Report

Nakhon Sawan Stadium, Nakhon Sawan
Attendance: 1,000
Referee: Sin Hwa Youen (South Korea)

== Knockout stage ==
=== Semi-finals ===
Winners qualified for 2003 FIFA Women's World Cup

19 June 2003
16:00

North Korea	3–0	Japan
Ri Kum-suk 8', 34'; Kobayashi 83' (o.g.)	Report

Rajamangala Stadium, Bangkok
Attendance: 2,000
Referee: Bentla D'Coth (India)
19 June 2003
19:00

China	3–1	South Korea
Bai Jie 11', 19'; Sun Wen 88'	Report	Kim Jin-hee 25'

Rajamangala Stadium, Bangkok
Attendance: 5,000
Referee: Mayumi Oiwa (Japan)

=== Third place match ===
Since the host China PR reached the final, the winner qualified for 2003 FIFA Women's World Cup while the loser entered CONCACAF–AFC play-off.

21 June 2003
15:00

Japan	0–1	South Korea
	Report	Hwang In-sun 18'

Rajamangala Stadium, Bangkok
Attendance: 2,000
Referee: Ri Hong-sil (North Korea)

=== Final ===
21 June 2003
18:00

North Korea	2–1 (a.e.t./g.g.)	China
Ri Kum-suk 41', 108' (pen.)	Report	Gao Hongxia 54'

Rajamangala Stadium, Bangkok
Attendance: 5,000
Referee: Im Eun-ju (South Korea)

== Awards ==
2003 AFC Women's Championship winners

North Korea
Second title

== Goalscorers ==
There were 184 goals scored in 30 matches, for an average of 6.13 goals per match.

15 goals

- (North Korea) Ri Kum-suk

9 goals

- (Japan) Mio Otani
- (North Korea) Jin Pyol-hui

7 goals

- (China) Bai Jie
- (China) Sun Wen
- (South Korea) Park Eun-sun

6 goals

- (Japan) Homare Sawa

5 goals

- (China) Teng Wei
- (Japan) Karina Maruyama
- (Japan) Yayoi Kobayashi
- (South Korea) Lee Ji-eun
- (North Korea) Yun Yong-hui
- (Vietnam) Lưu Ngọc Mai

3 goals

- (China) Han Duan
- (China) Liu Ying
- (South Korea) Hwang In-sun
- (Myanmar) Aye Nandar Hlaing
- (North Korea) Ho Sun-hui
- (North Korea) Pak Kum-chun
- (North Korea) Ri Un-gyong

2 goals

- (China) Gao Hongxia
- (China) Ren Liping
- (Chinese Taipei) Lin Yu-hui
- (India) Sujata Kaur
- (India) Thongam Tababi Devi
- (Japan) Tomoe Kato
- (South Korea) Cha Sung-mi
- (South Korea) Kim Jin-hee
- (Myanmar) San San Kyu
- (North Korea) Pak Kyong-sun
- (North Korea) Ra Mi-ae
- (North Korea) Ri Un-suk

1 goal

- (China) Pu Wei
- (China) Qu Feifei
- (China) Zhao Lihong
- (China) Zhou Xiaoxia
- (Chinese Taipei) Chen Shu-chiung
- (Chinese Taipei) Cheng Yu-hsin
- (Chinese Taipei) Ho Meng-ting
- (Chinese Taipei) Huang Chun-lan
- (Chinese Taipei) Wu Hsin-jung
- (Guam) Rhoda Santos
- (Guam) Tera Flores
- (Hong Kong) Ng Wing Kum
- (Hong Kong) Yau Ka Wai
- (India) Maichon Khundrakpam
- (India) Rani Chanu
- (India) Robita Wangkhem
- (Japan) Aya Miyama
- (Japan) Eriko Arakawa
- (Japan) Hiromi Ikeda
- (Japan) Kyoko Yano
- (Japan) Tomomi Miyamoto
- (Japan) Yuka Miyazaki
- (South Korea) Lee Myung-hwa
- (South Korea) Shin Sun-nam
- (South Korea) Sung Hyun-ah
- (Myanmar) Hla Hla Thant
- (Myanmar) Moe Moe War
- (Myanmar) Thu Zar Htwe
- (Myanmar) Zin Mar Wann
- (North Korea) Jang Ok-gyong
- (North Korea) O Kum-ran
- (North Korea) Ri Hyang-ok
- (North Korea) Sin Kum-ok
- (Philippines) Josephine Loren
- (Philippines) Rhea Penales
- (Thailand) Anootsara Maijarern
- (Thailand) Chownee Phanlet
- (Thailand) Hathairat Thongsri
- (Thailand) Kitiya Thiangtham
- (Thailand) Pranee Saipin
- (Thailand) Saranya Kaewka
- (Uzbekistan) Narghiza Kosimova
- (Uzbekistan) Nargiza Abdurasulova
- (Vietnam) Đoàn Thị Kim Chi

1 own goal

- (Japan) Yayoi Kobayashi (against North Korea)
- (Philippines) Bautista Callejas (against Myanmar)

2 own goals

- (Chinese Taipei) Huang Feng-chiu (against Japan and Myanmar)
