= 2001 AFC Women's Championship =

2001年亞足聯女子亞洲杯

Tournament details
- Host country: Taiwan
- Dates: 4–16 December
- Teams: 14 (from 1 confederation)

Final positions
- Champions: North Korea (1st title)
- Runners-up: Japan
- Third place: China
- Fourth place: South Korea

Tournament statistics
- Matches played: 30
- Goals scored: 197 (6.57 per match)
- Top scorer: (North Korea) Ri Kum-suk (15 goals)

The 2001 AFC Women's Championship was a women's football tournament held in Taipei County, Taiwan between 4 and 16 December 2001. It was the 13th staging of the AFC Women's Championship, consisting of fourteen teams.

== Teams ==
- China
- Chinese Taipei
- Guam
- Hong Kong
- India
- Japan
- North Korea
- South Korea
- Malaysia
- Philippines
- Singapore
- Thailand
- Uzbekistan
- Vietnam

== Group stage ==
A total of 14 teams were divided into two groups consisting five teams and a group consist four teams.

=== Group A ===
Team	Pld	W	D	L	GF	GA	GD	Pts
South Korea	4	4	0	0	15	0	+15	12
Chinese Taipei	4	3	0	1	24	1	+23	9
Thailand	4	2	0	2	5	9	−4	6
India	4	1	0	3	3	13	−10	3
Malaysia	4	0	0	4	0	24	−24	0

Source: RSSSF
4 December 2001

Chinese Taipei	14–0	Malaysia
Lin Chi-i 14', 25' (pen.), 66', ?', ?'; Chen Ya-ling ?'; Huang Chun-lan ?', ?', ?'; Chang Hui-ching ?', ?'; ?; ?; ?	Report

Chungshan Soccer Stadium, Taipei
4 December 2001

India	0–7	South Korea
	Report	Yoo Young-sil ?'; Lee Myung-hwa ?'; Koak Mi-Hi ?', ?'; Kong Sun-Mi ?'; Cha Sung-Mi ?', ?'

Chungshan Soccer Stadium, Taipei

6 December 2001

Malaysia	0–4	Thailand
	Report	Nuengrutai Srathongvian 2', 74'; ?; Haineh Bte Liem (o.g.)

Chungshan Soccer Stadium, Taipei
6 December 2001

Chinese Taipei	5–0	India
Lee Ming-Shu 12', 61'; Liao Ying-Wan ?'; Huang Chun-Lan ?'; Lin Chi-I 85' (pen.)	Report

Chungshan Soccer Stadium, Taipei
Attendance: 1,000

8 December 2001

Malaysia	0–3	South Korea

Taipei Municipality Stadium, Taipei
8 December 2001
16:00

Chinese Taipei	5–0	Thailand

Taipei Municipality Stadium, Taipei

10 December 2001

India	0–1	Thailand

Taipei
10 December 2001

Chinese Taipei	0–1	South Korea

Taipei

12 December 2001

South Korea	4–0	Thailand
Lee Ji-eun 7'; Kwon Min-joo 57', 73'; Lee Kye-lim 72'	Report

Taipei Municipality Stadium, Taipei
Attendance: 1,000
12 December 2001

India	3–0	Malaysia
Kar 21', 22'; Shadokpam 27'	Report

Taipei Municipality Stadium, Taipei

=== Group B ===
Team	Pld	W	D	L	GF	GA	GD	Pts
North Korea	4	4	0	0	48	0	+48	12
Japan	4	3	0	1	28	2	+26	9
Vietnam	4	2	0	2	11	7	+4	6
Singapore	4	1	0	3	2	47	−45	3
Guam	4	0	0	4	1	34	−33	0

Source: RSSSF
4 December 2001

Japan	14–0	Singapore
Kasajima ?'; Sawa ?', ?', ?', ?'; Otani ?', ?'; Isaka ?', ?', ?', ?'; Sato ?', ?'; Obe ?'	Report

Taipei Municipality Stadium, Taipei
4 December 2001

North Korea	19–0	Guam
	Report

Taipei Municipality Stadium, Taipei

6 December 2001

Vietnam	2–0	Guam
Đoàn Thị Kim Chi 13', 52'	Report

Taipei Municipality Stadium, Taipei
6 December 2001

North Korea	24–0	Singapore
Ri Kum-suk ?', ?', ?', ?', ?', ?'; Jin Pyol-hui ?', ?', ?', 79'; Ri Un-gyong ?', ?', ?', ?'; ?	Report

Taipei Municipality Stadium, Taipei

8 December 2001
14:00

Japan	11–0	Guam
Sawa ?', ?'; Isaka ?', ?'; Ito ?'; Otani ?', ?', ?'; Fujimura ?'; Isozaki ?', ?'

Chungshan Soccer Stadium, Taipei
8 December 2001
16:00

North Korea	4–0	Vietnam

Chungshan Soccer Stadium, Taipei

10 December 2001

Vietnam	8–0	Singapore

Taipei
10 December 2001

Japan	0–1	North Korea
		Ri Kum-suk ?'

Taipei

12 December 2001

Japan	3–1	Vietnam
Ito 8'; Otani 75', 89'	Report

Chungshan Soccer Stadium, Taipei
12 December 2001

Guam	1–2	Singapore
Jane O'Connor 12'	Report	Noor Azean Bte Adam 11'; Tina Afrida Nasmi 15'

Chungshan Soccer Stadium, Taipei

=== Group C ===
Team	Pld	W	D	L	GF	GA	GD	Pts
China	3	3	0	0	31	0	+31	9
Uzbekistan	3	2	0	1	9	11	−2	6
Hong Kong	3	1	0	2	2	15	−13	3
Philippines	3	0	0	3	1	17	−16	0

Source: RSSSF
5 December 2001

China	10–0	Hong Kong
Bai Lili ?'; ?; ?; Wen Lirong ?'; Liu Ying 33'; Bai Jie ?'; Pu Wei ?', ?'; Liu Ailing ?'; Pan Lina ?'	Report

Taipei Municipality Stadium, Taipei
Attendance: 1,500
5 December 2001

Uzbekistan	5–0	Philippines
? 15'; ?; ?; ? 74'; ? 77'	Report

Taipei Municipality Stadium, Taipei

7 December 2001

Hong Kong	2–1	Philippines
Yau Ka Wai 30'; Wai Hoi Ying 73'	Report	Agravante 78'

Chungshan Soccer Stadium, Taipei
7 December 2001

China	11–0	Uzbekistan
Zhang Ouying 9', 17', 18', 58'; Bechtova 37' (o.g.); Liu Ailing ?'; Mo Chenyue ?', ?', ?'; Zhao Lihong ?'; Qu Feifei ?'	Report

Chungshan Soccer Stadium, Taipei

9 December 2001

Uzbekistan	4–0	Hong Kong
Usmanova 39'; Azamova 75', 78'; Gulamova 76'	Report

Taipei Municipality Stadium, Taipei
9 December 2001

China	10–0	Philippines
Qu Feifei 3'; Sun Wen 8'; Pu Wei 25', 35', 39'; Liu Ying 58', 76'; Bai Jie 68', ?', 85'	Report

Taipei Municipality Stadium, Taipei

=== Ranking of second-placed teams ===
The top team qualified for the semi finals. Results against the fifth-placed teams of each group A and B were not counted in determining the ranking of the third-placed teams.

Pos	Grp	Team	Pld	W	D	L	GF	GA	GD	Pts	Qualification
1	B	Japan	3	2	0	1	17	2	+15	6	Semi-Final
2	A	Chinese Taipei	3	2	0	1	10	1	+9	6	
3	C	Uzbekistan	3	2	0	1	9	11	−2	6	

Source: AFC
Rules for classification: 1) points; 2) goal difference; 3) goals scored; 4) disciplinary points; 5) drawing of lots.

== Knockout stage ==
=== Semi-finals ===
14 December 2001
16:30

South Korea	1–2	Japan
Lee Ji-eun 27'	Report	Kobayashi 10'; Otani 89'

Chungshan Soccer Stadium, Taipei
Attendance: 4,000
Referee: Pannipar Kamnueng (Thailand)
14 December 2001
19:30

North Korea	3–1	China
Pak Kum-chun 20'; Jin Pyol-hui 35', 68'	Report	Sun Wen 42'

Chungshan Soccer Stadium, Taipei
Attendance: 1,000
Referee: Anna De Toni (Italy)

=== Third place match ===
16 December 2001
19:30

South Korea	0–8	China
	Report	Pu Wei 5', 85'; Bai Lili 7', 57'; Han Duan 19', 89', 90'; Zhang Ouying 59'

Chungshan Soccer Stadium, Taipei
Attendance: 1,000
Referee: Tammy Ogston (Australia)

=== Final ===
16 December 2001
16:30

North Korea	2–0	Japan
Ri Kum-suk 66'; Ri Un-gyong 73'	Report

Chungshan Soccer Stadium, Taipei
Attendance: 4,000
Referee: Mayumi Oiwa (Japan)

== Awards ==
2001 AFC Women's Championship winners

North Korea
First title

== See also ==
- List of sporting events in Taiwan
