= Football at the 2004 Summer Olympics – Women's qualification =

The qualification for women's football tournament at the 2004 Summer Olympics.

The following qualification tournaments were held to determine the participating nations.

== Qualified teams ==
The following teams qualified for the final tournament.

Confederation (Region)	Berths	Qualified Teams
Host nation (automatically qualified)	1	Greece
UEFA (Europe)	2	Germany; Sweden
CONMEBOL (South America)	1	Brazil
CONCACAF (North, Central America and Caribbean)	2	United States; Mexico
CAF (Africa)	1	Nigeria
AFC (Asia)	2	China; Japan
OFC (Oceania)	1	Australia

== AFC ==
All matches were held in Japan.

=== Group A ===
Pos	Team	Pld	W	D	L	GF	GA	GD	Pts
1	North Korea	3	3	0	0	22	0	+22	9
2	Chinese Taipei	3	2	0	1	8	6	+2	6
3	Hong Kong	3	1	0	2	3	12	−9	3
4	Singapore	3	0	0	3	0	15	−15	0

Source: Japan Football Association
18 April 2004

North Korea	5 - 0	Chinese Taipei
Ri Kum-suk 11', 69'; Ri Hyang-ok 19'; Yun Yong-hui 36'; Jin Pyol-hui 84'

Hiroshima Big Arch
18 April 2004

Singapore	0 - 2	Hong Kong

Hiroshima Big Arch
20 April 2004

Chinese Taipei	5 - 0	Singapore

Hiroshima Big Arch
20 April 2004

Hong Kong	0 - 9	North Korea
		Ra Mi-ae 6'; Ho Sun-hui 7', 69'; Jin Pyol-hui 8'; Ri Kum-suk 50', 52', 90'; Ri Hyang-ok 62'; Pak Kyong-sun 80'

Hiroshima Big Arch
22 April 2004

North Korea	8 - 0	Singapore
Jin Pyol-hui 6'; Seok Cheon-myong 12'; Ri Kum-suk 16', 23'; O Kum-ran 42'; Pak Kyong-sun 45'; Ri Un-gyong 49', 73'

Hiroshima Big Arch
22 April 2004

Hong Kong	1 - 3	Chinese Taipei

Hiroshima Big Arch

=== Group B ===
Pos	Team	Pld	W	D	L	GF	GA	GD	Pts
1	China	3	3	0	0	23	0	+23	9
2	South Korea	3	2	0	1	14	3	+11	6
3	Myanmar	3	1	0	2	2	18	−16	3
4	Guam	3	0	0	3	0	18	−18	0

Source: Japan Football Association
18 April 2004

China	11 - 0	Myanmar
Teng Wei 13', 47', 84', 90+2'; Li Jie 29', 61', 79'; Bi Yan 31'; Qu Feifei 32'; Han Duan 36'; Ren Liping 74'

Hiroshima Stadium
18 April 2004

South Korea	7 - 0	Guam

Hiroshima Stadium
20 April 2004

Myanmar	0 - 7	South Korea

Hiroshima Stadium
20 April 2004

Guam	0 - 9	China
		Bai Lili 13', 59'; Han Duan 25', 90+1'; Liu Huana 31'; Teng Wei 48'; Bi Yan 64', 73'

Hiroshima Stadium
22 April 2004

Guam	0 - 2	Myanmar

Hiroshima Stadium
22 April 2004

China	3 - 0	South Korea
Li Jie 50'; Qu Feifei 53'; Ji Ting 90+1'

Hiroshima Stadium

=== Group C ===
Pos	Team	Pld	W	D	L	GF	GA	GD	Pts
1	Japan	2	2	0	0	13	0	+13	6
2	Thailand	2	0	1	1	0	6	−6	1
3	Vietnam	2	0	1	1	0	7	−7	1

Source: Japan Football Association
18 April 2004

Japan	7 - 0	Vietnam
Miyamoto 3', 41'; Otani 7', 59'; Maruyama 60'; Yamamoto 85'; Sawa 90'

Komazawa Olympic Park Stadium
20 April 2004

Vietnam	0 - 0	Thailand

Komazawa Olympic Park Stadium
22 April 2004

Thailand	0 - 6	Japan
		Maruyama 11', 47'; Ando 32'; Kobayashi 51'; Otani 72'; Yamamoto 90+2'

National Stadium, Tokyo

=== Semifinals ===
Semi-finals
24 April
North Korea	0
Japan	3
24 April
China	1
South Korea	0

Final
26 April
Japan	0
China	1
Third place
26 April
North Korea	5
South Korea	1

24 April 2004

North Korea	0 - 3	Japan
		Arakawa 11'; 45+1' (o.g.); Otani 64'

National Stadium, Tokyo
24 April 2004

China	1 - 0	South Korea
Qu Feifei 60'

Hiroshima Big Arch

=== Third-place match ===
26 April 2004

North Korea	5 - 1	South Korea
Seok Cheon-myung 2'; Ri Kum-suk 32'; Ri Hyang-ok 40', 71'; O Kum-ran 88'		Park Eun-sun 39'

Hiroshima Big Arch

=== Final ===
26 April 2004

Japan	0 - 1	China
		Li Jie 57'

Hiroshima Big Arch

=== Awards ===
Best Player Award	Top Goalscorer	Fair Play Award
Teng Wei (China)	Ri Kum-suk (North Korea, 8 goals)	Japan

== CAF ==
All matches were played on away and home legs.

=== First round ===
No matches played.

Team 1	Agg.	Team 2	1st leg	2nd leg
South Africa	bye		—	—
Namibia	w/o	Tanzania	—	—
Zimbabwe	bye		—	—
Angola	w/o	Cape Verde	—	—
Nigeria	bye		—	—
Kenya	w/o	Uganda	—	—
Ghana	bye		—	—
DR Congo	w/o	Equatorial Guinea	—	—

=== Second round ===
Team 1	Agg.	Team 2	1st leg	2nd leg
South Africa	26–1	Namibia	13–0	13–1
Zimbabwe	0–1 (a.e.t.)	Angola	0–0	0–1
Nigeria	w/o	Kenya	—	—
Ghana	4–1	DR Congo	2–0	2–1

25 October 2003

South Africa	13–0	Namibia
Phewa 27', 46', 76'; Nyandeni 33', 59'; Carelse 42'; Jiyane 47'; Solomon 55', 78', 90'; Modise 63'

8 November 2003

Namibia	1–13	South Africa

South Africa qualfied to the Third round after finish 26–1 on aggregates.

26 October 2003

Zimbabwe	0–0	Angola

8 November 2003

Angola	1–0 (a.e.t.)	Zimbabwe
Nady 98'

Angola qualfied to the Third round after finish 1–0 on aggregates.

25 October 2003

Ghana	2–0	DR Congo
Foriwa 66'; Bayor 90'

9 November 2003

DR Congo	1–2	Ghana

Ghana qualfied to the Third round after finish 4–1 on aggregates.

=== Third round ===
Team 1	Agg.	Team 2	1st leg	2nd leg
South Africa	8–5	Angola	6–2	2–3
Nigeria	2–2 (3–2 p)	Ghana	1–1	1–1

1 February 2004

South Africa	6–2	Angola
Phewa 24', 45+1'; Nyandeni 33'; Carelse 42'; Modise 50', 67', 90+2'		Guigui 34', 70'

14 February 2004

Angola	3–2	South Africa
Guigui 8'; Sarita 76', 90'		Modise 38'; Zitha 55'

South Africa qualfied to the Final round after finish 8–5 on aggregates.

31 January 2004

Nigeria	1–1	Ghana
Mbacha 80'		Avoe 5'

14 February 2004

Ghana	1–1	Nigeria
Sackey 56'		Nkechi 51'
Penalties
	2–3

Nigeria qualfied to the Final round on penalties free kicks after finish 2–2 on aggregates.

=== Final round ===
Team 1	Agg.	Team 2	1st leg	2nd leg
South Africa	2–3	Nigeria	2–2	0–1

12 March 2004

South Africa	2–2	Nigeria
Modise 35', 72'		Okolo 23'; Nkwocha 26'

Pretoria
30 March 2004

Nigeria	1–0	South Africa
Okolo 69'

Abuja

Nigeria wins 3–2 on aggregates and qualified for the Olympic Games.

== CONCACAF ==
Mexico and the United States earned Olympic qualification places by winning their semi-final matches.

=== Preliminary round ===
==== Caribbean Zone ====
Series A

Team 1	Agg.	Team 2	1st leg	2nd leg
Suriname	2–6	Trinidad and Tobago	0–2	2–4

Series B

Team 1	Agg.	Team 2	1st leg	2nd leg
Jamaica	4–0	Cayman Islands	3–0	1–0

Series C

Team 1	Agg.	Team 2	1st leg	2nd leg
Dominican Republic	2–10	Haiti	0–7	2–3

==== North/Central American Zone ====
Series D

Pos	Team	Pld	Pts
1	Mexico	2	6
2	Honduras (H)	2	3
3	Nicaragua	2	0

Source: CONCACAF
(H) Hosts
Series E

Pos	Team	Pld	Pts
1	Guatemala (H)	2	4
2	Panama	2	4
3	Belize	2	0

Source: CONCACAF
(H) Hosts

Following the matches in Series E Guatemala were suspended from international football allowing Panama to advance in their place.

=== Group stage ===
Eight teams participated in the group stage. The top two teams from each group advanced to the semi-finals.

Group A

Pos	Team	Pld	Pts
1	Canada	3	9
2	Costa Rica (H)	3	6
3	Panama	3	3
4	Jamaica	3	0

Source: CONCACAF
(H) Hosts
Group B

Pos	Team	Pld	Pts
1	United States	3	9
2	Mexico	3	6
3	Trinidad and Tobago	3	3
4	Haiti	3	0

Source: CONCACAF

=== Knockout stage ===
The winners of the semi-finals qualified for the Olympics.

Semi-finals
3 March – San José
Canada	1
Mexico	2
3 March – San José
United States	4
Costa Rica	0

Final
5 March – Heredia
Mexico	2
United States	3
Third place play-off
5 March – Heredia
Canada	4
Costa Rica	0

== CONMEBOL ==
CONMEBOL did not hold the qualifying competition for the one spot but nominated Brazil, the winners of 2003 South American Women's Football Championship and 2003 Pan American Games, as the South American representative. Brazil also achieved the best performance among CONMEBOL teams at the 2003 FIFA Women's World Cup, having advanced to the quarter-finals, while the confederation's only other team, Argentina, were eliminated in the group stage.

== OFC ==
All matches were held in Fiji.

Pos	Team	Pld	W	D	L	GF	GA	GD	Pts
1	Australia	2	2	0	0	17	0	+17	6
2	Papua New Guinea	2	1	0	1	2	10	−8	3
3	Fiji	2	0	0	2	0	9	−9	0

2 March 2004

Fiji	0 - 2	Papua New Guinea

Fiji
4 March 2004

Australia	10 - 0	Papua New Guinea

Fiji
6 March 2004

Fiji	0 - 7	Australia

Fiji

== UEFA ==
Due to scheduling issues, UEFA did not hold a separate qualifying competition; UEFA instead announced that the top two UEFA teams in 2003 FIFA Women's World Cup were to qualify for the Olympics. As a result, the World Cup winners Germany and the runners-up Sweden qualified for the Olympics (together with the hosts Greece).
