= Pak Kyong-sun =

North Korean footballer

Personal information
- Date of birth: 23 June 1985 (age 41)
- Position: Forward

International career^{‡}
| Years | Team | Apps | (Gls) |
| | North Korea | 2 | (0) |
- ‡ National team caps and goals as of 29 September 2003

Pak Kyong-sun (born 23 June 1985) is a North Korean women's international footballer who plays as a forward. She is a member of the North Korea women's national football team. She was part of the team at the 2003 FIFA Women's World Cup.

== International goals ==
| No. | Date | Venue | Opponent | Score | Result | Competition |
|---|---|---|---|---|---|---|
| 1. | 14 June 2003 | Bangkok, Thailand | Singapore | 8–0 | 16–0 | 2003 AFC Women's Championship |
| 2. | 14 June 2003 | Bangkok, Thailand | Singapore | 13–0 | 16–0 | 2003 AFC Women's Championship |
| 3. | 20 April 2004 | Hiroshima, Japan | Hong Kong | 8–0 | 9–0 | 2004 Summer Olympics qualification |
| 4. | 22 April 2004 | Hiroshima, Japan | Singapore | 6–0 | 8–0 | 2004 Summer Olympics qualification |
