= Hwang In-sun (footballer) =

South Korean footballer

Personal information
- Date of birth: 2 February 1976 (age 50)
- Position: Midfielder

Youth career
- Wirye I.C.T. High School
- Ulsan College

Senior career*
Years	Team	Apps	(Gls)
1996-2004	INI Steel		
2004-2006	Seoul City		

International career^{‡}
1994-2004	South Korea	39	(3)

Managerial career
- 2007-2009: Seoul City (coach)
- 2010: South Korea U-20 (coach)
- 2015-2017: Hwacheon I.C.T. High School
- 2017: Gyeongju KHNP (coach)
- 2018: South Korea U-17 (coach)
- 2019: South Korea U-20 (coach)
- 2019-2021: South Korea (coach)
- 2019: South Korea (caretaker manager)
- 2021-2023: South Korea U-20
- * Club domestic league appearances and goals ‡ National team caps and goals as of 05:34, 20 May 2026 (UTC)

Hwang In-sun (Korean: 황인선, born 2 February 1976) is a South Korean football manager and former footballer. She previously played for the South Korea women's national team, including at the 2003 FIFA Women's World Cup. In 2021, Hwang became the first woman to manage a South Korean national football team when she was appointed as head coach of the women's under-20 side.

== Club career ==
As a youth Hwang played for Wirye I.C.T. High School and Ulsan College. She then played for INI Steel from 1996-2004 before moving to the newly established Seoul City WFC in 2004 as the club's first captain. She retired as a club level player in 2006.

== International career ==
Hwang scored the winning goal in South Korea's 1–0 win against Japan in the third-place play-off at the 2003 AFC Women's Championship, earning the country qualification for the FIFA Women's World Cup for the first time. She retired from international football in 2004.

== Coaching career ==
Hwang began her coaching career at Seoul City WFC in 2007 before joining the national team staff ahead of the 2010 FIFA U-20 Women's World Cup, where South Korea finished in third place. She was in charge of the senior women's national team for a short spell as caretaker manager in 2019, then served as an assistant coach to Colin Bell.

In 2021, Hwang was appointed as head coach of South Korea's women's under-20 team, becoming the first woman to lead a South Korean national team. She led the side at the 2022 FIFA U-20 Women's World Cup, where South Korea finished in third place in Group C, failing to reach the knockout stage of the tournament. In 2023 Hwang's squad won the gold medal in the women's football competition at the 2023 East Asian Youth Games, winning all three of their matches without conceding any goals.

== Career statistics ==
List of international goals scored by Hwang In-sun
No.	goals No	Venue	Opponent	Score	Result	Competition
1.	2 October 2002	Changwon Stadium, Changwon, South Korea	Vietnam	1–0	4–0	2002 Asian Games
2.	16 June 2003	Rajamangala Stadium, Bangkok, Thailand	North Korea	2–1	2–2	2003 AFC Women's Championship
3.	21 June 2003	Rajamangala Stadium, Bangkok, Thailand	Japan	1–0	1–0	2003 AFC Women's Championship
