= Park Choong-kwon =

North Korean defector to South Korea

Park Choong-kwon (Korean: 박충권) is a South Korean member of parliament. He was once a ballistic missile researcher for North Korea, defecting to South Korea when he was 23. He grew up sheltered in the 1990s during a massive famine, but was exposed to outside life through smuggled South Korean TV shows and studying abroad in China. The morning after the first intercontinental ballistic missile (ICBM) launched by North Korea in April 2009, the same weapon he had built over years, he began his escape under the noise of the nationwide celebration. He defected through China, spending nearly 10 million won, and climbing over the Tumen River. When he entered South Korea after getting an official passport, he assimilated quickly, and was accepted into Seoul National University to earn a PhD in materials science and engineering. He got a job at Hyundai Steel before entering the political scene.
