= Shin Sun-nam (footballer) =

South Korean footballer

Personal information
- Date of birth: 30 May 1981 (age 45)
- Position: Midfielder

Senior career*
Years	Team	Apps	(Gls)
- INI Steel

International career^{‡}
	South Korea	27	(2)
- * Club domestic league appearances and goals ‡ National team caps and goals as of 06:25, 18 May 2026 (UTC)

- Shin Sun-nam
- Hangul: 신순남
- RR: Sin Sunnam
- MR: Sin Sunnam

Shin Sun-nam (born 30 May 1981) is a South Korean former footballer who played as a midfielder. She was a member of the South Korea women's national football team at the 2003 FIFA Women's World Cup. At club level, she played for INI Steel in South Korea.

== International goals ==
No.	Date	Venue	Opponent	Score	Result	Competition
1	12 June 2003	Rajamangala Stadium, Bangkok, Thailand	Singapore	4–0	4–0	2003 AFC Women's Championship
2	10 September 2003		Mexico	1–0	1–0	Friendly
