= Zhao Yan (footballer) =

Chinese footballer

Personal information
- Date of birth: 7 May 1972 (age 54)
- Position: Goalkeeper

International career^{‡}
Years	Team	Apps	(Gls)
	China	2	(0)
Medal record
Women's football
Representing China
Asian Games
Gold medal – first place	1998 Bangkok	Team
Silver medal – second place	2002 Busan	Team
- ‡ National team caps and goals as of 29 September 2003

Zhao Yan (born 7 May 1972) is a Chinese women's international footballer who plays as a goalkeeper. She is a member of the China women's national football team. She was part of the team at the 2003 FIFA Women's World Cup.
