= Sun Rui (footballer, born 1978) =

Chinese footballer

Personal information
- Date of birth: 30 March 1978 (age 48)
- Position: Defender

International career
Years	Team	Apps	(Gls)
- China
Medal record
Women's football
Representing China
Asian Games
Silver medal – second place	2002 Busan	Team

Sun Rui is a Chinese football player. She was part of the Chinese team at the 2003 FIFA Women's World Cup.
