= Jung Ho-jung =

South Korean footballer (born 1976)

Personal information
- Date of birth: 11 May 1976 (age 50)
- Position: Goalkeeper

Senior career*
Years	Team	Apps	(Gls)
- INI Steel

International career^{‡}
- South Korea
Korean name
Hangul	정호정
RR	Jeong Hojeong
MR	Chŏng Hojŏng
- * Club domestic league appearances and goals ‡ National team caps and goals as of 20 September 2003 (before the 2003 FIFA Women's World Cup)

Jung Ho-jung (born 11 May 1976) is a South Korean retired women's international footballer who played as a goalkeeper. She was a member of the South Korea women's national football team. She was part of the team at the 2003 FIFA Women's World Cup. At club level, she played for INI Steel in South Korea.
