= Lee Ji-eun (footballer) =

South Korean footballer

Personal information
- Date of birth: 16 December 1979 (age 46)
- Position: Forward

Youth career
- Hanyang Women's University

Senior career*
Years	Team	Apps	(Gls)
- INI Steel

International career^{‡}
	South Korea	3	(0)
- * Club domestic league appearances and goals ‡ National team caps and goals as of 29 September 2003

Lee Ji-eun (Korean: 이지은; born 16 December 1979) is a retired South Korean women's international footballer who played as a forward. She was a member of the South Korea women's national football team. She was part of the team at the 2003 FIFA Women's World Cup. At club level, she plays for INI Steel in South Korea.

== International goals ==
No.	Date	Venue	Opponent	Score	Result	Competition
1.	2 October 2002	Changwon Stadium, Changwon, South Korea	Vietnam	3–0	4–0	2002 Asian Games
2.	8 June 2003	Rajamangala Stadium, Bangkok, Thailand	Hong Kong	2–0	8–0	2003 AFC Women's Championship
3.	8 June 2003	Rajamangala Stadium, Bangkok, Thailand	Hong Kong	3–0	8–0	2003 AFC Women's Championship
4.	10 June 2003	Rajamangala Stadium, Bangkok, Thailand	Thailand	3–0	6–0	2003 AFC Women's Championship
5.	10 June 2003	Rajamangala Stadium, Bangkok, Thailand	Thailand	6–0	6–0	2003 AFC Women's Championship
6.	16 June 2003	Rajamangala Stadium, Bangkok, Thailand	North Korea	1–0	2–2	2003 AFC Women's Championship
