= Kim Un-ok =

North Korean footballer (born 1978)

Personal information
- Date of birth: 18 April 1978 (age 48)
- Position: Midfielder

International career^{‡}
Years	Team	Apps	(Gls)
- North Korea
- ‡ National team caps and goals as of 19 June 1999 (before the 1999 FIFA Women's World Cup)

Kim Un-ok (Korean: 김은옥; born 18 April 1978) is a North Korean women's international footballer who plays as a midfielder. She is a member of the North Korea women's national football team. She was part of the team at the 1999 FIFA Women's World Cup.
