= Chon Kyong-hwa =

North Korean footballer (born 1983)

Personal information
- Date of birth: 7 August 1983 (age 43)
- Place of birth: North Korea
- Position: Goalkeeper

International career^{‡}
Years	Team	Apps	(Gls)
- North Korea
- ‡ National team caps and goals as of 20 September 2003 (before the 2003 FIFA Women's World Cup)

Chon Kyong-hwa (Korean: 천경화; born 7 August 1983) is a North Korean women's international footballer who plays as a goalkeeper. She is a member of the North Korea women's national football team. She was part of the team at the 2003 FIFA Women's World Cup. She plays for Rimyongsu.
