= Karina Maruyama =

Japanese tarento and footballer

Karina Maruyama 丸山 桂里奈
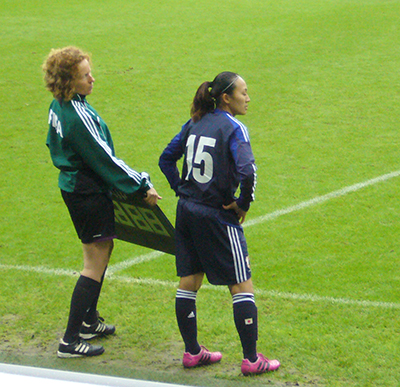
- Maruyama (right) in 2013

Personal information
- Full name: Karina Maruyama
- Date of birth: 26 March 1983 (age 43)
- Place of birth: Ota, Tokyo, Japan
- Height: 1.63 m (5 ft 4 in)
- Position: Forward

Youth career
- 1998–2000: Murata Women's High School
- 2001–2004: Nippon Sport Science University

Senior career*
Years	Team	Apps	(Gls)
2005–2009	TEPCO Mareeze	86	(44)
2010	Philadelphia Independence	4	(0)
2010–2011	JEF United Chiba	14	(2)
2012–2016	Konomiya Speranza Osaka-Takatsuki	96	(13)
Total		200	(59)

International career
2002	Japan U-20	4	(0)
2002–2014	Japan	79	(14)
Medal record
Representing Japan
Olympic Games
Silver medal – second place	2012 London	Team
FIFA Women's World Cup
Gold medal – first place	2011 Germany
AFC Women's Asian Cup
Gold medal – first place	2014 Vietnam
Bronze medal – third place	2008 Vietnam
Asian Games
Silver medal – second place	2006 Doha	Team
Bronze medal – third place	2002 Busan	Team
AFC U-19 Women's Championship
Gold medal – first place	2002 India
- * Club domestic league appearances and goals

Karina Maruyama (丸山 桂里奈, Maruyama Karina; born 26 March 1983) is a Japanese tarento and former football player. She played for the Japanese national team. Since her retirement, Maruyama has been active as a television personality, represented by the talent agency Horipro.

== Club career ==
Maruyama was born in Ota, Tokyo on 26 March 1983.

After graduating from Nippon Sport Science University, she joined TEPCO Mareeze in 2005 and was assigned to the section of Fukushima Daiichi Nuclear Power Plant.

Maruyama was selected as the L. League's Best Young Player for the 2005 season. She played in the L. League until the 2009 season. She left the league in 2010 to play for the Philadelphia Independence in the United States. In September, she returned to Japan and joined JEF United Chiba. In 2012, she moved to Speranza FC Osaka-Takatsuki (later Konomiya Speranza Osaka-Takatsuki). She retired at the end of the 2016 season.

== National team career ==
In August 2002, Maruyama was selected to the Japan U-20 national team to play in the 2002 U-19 World Championship. In October, she was picked in the Japan national team for the 2002 Asian Games. At this competition, on 2 October, she debuted against North Korea. She played in the World Cup twice (2003 and 2011) and the Summer Olympics thrice (2004, 2008 and 2012). At the 2011 World Cup in Germany, she scored the only goal of the game, defeating the host country and taking Japan to its first ever semifinals of the tournament. She played as a substitute in the final as Japan defeated the United States. At the 2012 Summer Olympics, Japan won the silver medal. She played 79 games and scored 14 goals for Japan until retiring in 2014.

== Away from football ==
She was joined SASUKE 35 at March 2018 and failed Stage 1 at TIE Fighter. She was joined SASUKE 38 at December 2020 and failed Stage 1 at Rolling Hill.

== National team statistics ==
Japan national team
Year	Apps	Goals
2002	5	0
2003	12	6
2004	11	3
2005	3	0
2006	9	1
2007	1	0
2008	17	3
2009	2	0
2010	0	0
2011	8	1
2012	5	0
2013	4	0
2014	2	0
Total	79	14

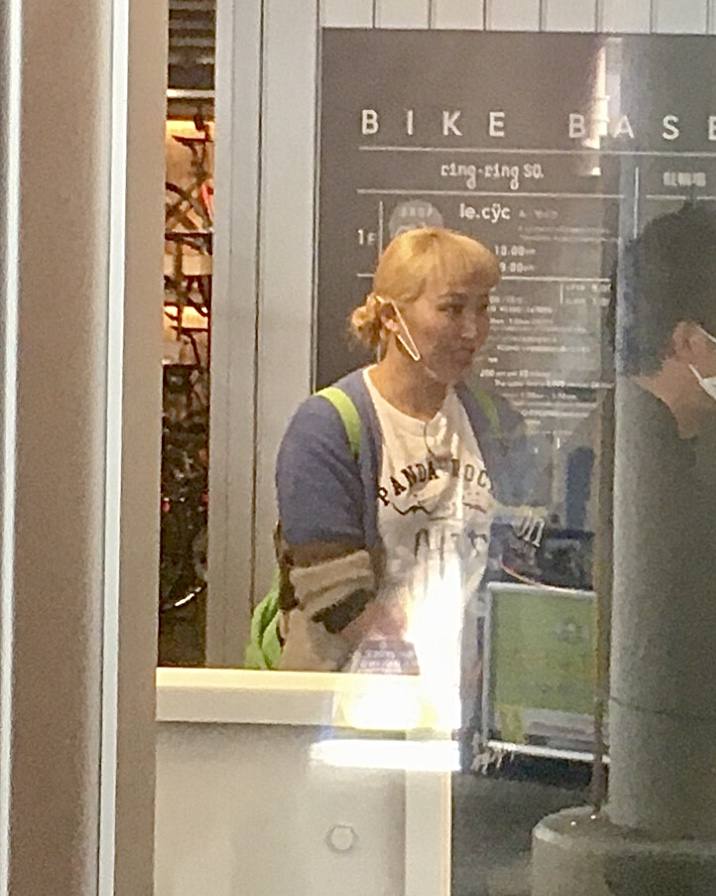
Karina Maruyama in 2020

== National team goals ==
#	Date	Venue	Opponent	Score	Result	Competition
1.	19 Mar 2003	Bangkok, Thailand	Thailand	Unknown	0–9	Friendly Match
2.	11 Jun 2003	Bangkok, Thailand	Guam	Unknown	7–0	2003 AFC Women's Championship
3.	11 Jun 2003	Bangkok, Thailand	Guam	Unknown	7–0	2003 AFC Women's Championship
4.	13 Jun 2003	Bangkok, Thailand	Myanmar	Unknown	7–0	2003 AFC Women's Championship
5.	15 Jun 2003	Bangkok, Thailand	Chinese Taipei	Unknown	5–0	2003 AFC Women's Championship
6.	12 Jul 2003	Tokyo, Japan	Mexico	2–0	2–0	2003 FIFA Women's World Cup qualification Play-off
7.	18 Apr 2004	Tokyo, Japan	Vietnam	Unknown	7–0	Football at the 2004 Summer Olympics qualification
8.	22 Apr 2004	Tokyo, Japan	Thailand	Unknown	6–0	Football at the 2004 Summer Olympics qualification
9.	22 Apr 2004	Tokyo, Japan	Thailand	Unknown	6–0	Football at the 2004 Summer Olympics qualification
10.	13 Nov 2006	Karlsruhe, Germany	Germany	3–6	3–6	Friendly Match
11.	31 May 2008	Ho Chi Minh City, Vietnam	Chinese Taipei	0–6	0–11	2008 AFC Women's Asian Cup
12.	31 May 2008	Ho Chi Minh City, Vietnam	Chinese Taipei	0–10	0–11	2008 AFC Women's Asian Cup
13.	24 Jul 2008	Kobe, Japan	Australia	3–0	3–0	Friendly Match
14.	9 Jul 2011	Wolfsburg, Germany	Germany	0–1	0–1	2011 FIFA Women's World Cup

== Honors ==
- FIFA Women's World Cup

Champion (1): 2011

- East Asian Football Championship

Champion (1): 2008

- AFC Women's Asian Cup

Champion: 2014
