= Ri Song-gun =

North Korean football manager

Personal information
- Date of birth: 20 April 1950
- Date of death: 22 September 2012 (aged 62)

Managerial career
- Years: Team
- 2003: North Korea Women
- 2010–2012: North Korea Women U17

Ri Song-gun (Korean: 리성근; 20 April 1950 – 22 September 2012) was a North Korean football manager.

== Career ==
Ri was the head coach of the North Korea women's national team at the 2003 FIFA Women's World Cup.
