= Thu Zar Htwe =

Burmese football player and manager and futsal player

Personal information
- Date of birth: 30 November 1984 (age 41)
- Position: Midfielder

International career^{‡}
| Years | Team | Apps | (Gls) |
| 2009–2010 | Myanmar | 3 | (0) |
- ‡ National team caps and goals as of 24 May 2010.

Thu Zar Htwe (Burmese: သူဇင်ထွေ; born 30 November 1984) is a Burmese footballer who plays as a midfielder. She has been a member of the Myanmar women's national team.

== International career ==
Thu Zar Htwe capped for Myanmar at senior level during the 2010 AFC Women's Asian Cup.
