= Yun In-sil =

North Korean footballer (born 1976)

Personal information
- Date of birth: 10 January 1976 (age 50)
- Position: Defender

International career^{‡}
Years	Team	Apps	(Gls)
	North Korea	6	(0)
- ‡ National team caps and goals as of 29 September 2003

Yun In-sil (born 10 January 1976, Korean: 윤인실) is a North Korean women's international footballer who plays as a defender. She is a member of the North Korea women's national football team. She was part of the team at the 1999 FIFA Women's World Cup and 2003 FIFA Women's World Cup. She plays for the Amnokgang Sports Club.
