= Yayoi Kobayashi =

Japanese footballer

Yayoi Kobayashi 小林 弥生
Personal information
- Full name: Yayoi Kobayashi
- Date of birth: September 18, 1981 (age 45)
- Place of birth: Tama, Tokyo, Japan
- Height: 1.57 m (5 ft 2 in)
- Position: Midfielder

Senior career*
| Years | Team | Apps | (Gls) |
| 1997–2014 | Nippon TV Beleza | 223 | (50) |
| Total | | 223 | (50) |

International career
| 1999–2004 | Japan | 54 | (12) |
Medal record
Nippon TV Beleza
| Winner | Nadeshiko League | 2000 |
| Winner | Nadeshiko League | 2001 |
| Winner | Nadeshiko League | 2002 |
| Winner | Nadeshiko League | 2005 |
| Winner | Nadeshiko League | 2006 |
| Winner | Nadeshiko League | 2007 |
| Winner | Nadeshiko League | 2008 |
| Winner | Nadeshiko League | 2010 |
| Runner-up | Nadeshiko League | 1997 |
| Runner-up | Nadeshiko League | 1998 |
| Runner-up | Nadeshiko League | 1999 |
| Runner-up | Nadeshiko League | 2003 |
| Runner-up | Nadeshiko League | 2004 |
| Runner-up | Nadeshiko League | 2009 |
| Runner-up | Nadeshiko League | 2011 |
| Runner-up | Nadeshiko League | 2012 |
| Runner-up | Nadeshiko League | 2013 |
| Runner-up | Nadeshiko League | 2014 |
| Winner | Nadeshiko League Cup | 1999 |
| Winner | Nadeshiko League Cup | 2007 |
| Winner | Nadeshiko League Cup | 2010 |
| Winner | Nadeshiko League Cup | 2012 |
| Runner-up | Nadeshiko League Cup | 1997 |
| Winner | Empress's Cup | 1997 |
| Winner | Empress's Cup | 2000 |
| Winner | Empress's Cup | 2004 |
| Winner | Empress's Cup | 2005 |
| Winner | Empress's Cup | 2007 |
| Winner | Empress's Cup | 2008 |
| Winner | Empress's Cup | 2009 |
| Winner | Empress's Cup | 2014 |
| Runner-up | Empress's Cup | 2002 |
| Runner-up | Empress's Cup | 2003 |
Representing Japan
AFC Women's Asian Cup
| Silver medal – second place | 2001 Chinese Taipei |
Asian Games
| Bronze medal – third place | 2002 Busan | Team |
- * Club domestic league appearances and goals

Yayoi Kobayashi (小林 弥生, Kobayashi Yayoi; born September 18, 1981) is a former Japanese football player. She played for Japan national team.

== Club career ==
Kobayashi was born in Tama on September 18, 1981. She played for Nippon TV Beleza from 1997 to 2014. In her 18 seasons, she played 223 matches in L.League. The club won L.League championship 8 times and 2nd position 10 times. She also became top scorer in 2000 season and she was selected Best Eleven in 2000 and 2001.

== National team career ==
On March 24, 1999, when Kobayashi was 17 years old, she debuted and scored a goal for Japan national team against France. She was a member of Japan for 1999, 2003 World Cup and 2004 Summer Olympics. She also played at 2001, 2003 AFC Championship and 2002 Asian Games. She played 54 games and scored 12 goals for Japan until 2004.

== National team statistics ==
Japan national team
| Year | Apps | Goals |
|---|---|---|
| 1999 | 8 | 2 |
| 2000 | 1 | 0 |
| 2001 | 12 | 2 |
| 2002 | 11 | 1 |
| 2003 | 14 | 6 |
| 2004 | 8 | 1 |
| Total | 54 | 12 |

== International goals ==
| No. | Date | Venue | Opponent | Score | Result | Competition |
|---|---|---|---|---|---|---|
| 5. | 11 October 2002 | Masan Stadium, Changwon, South Korea | Chinese Taipei | 1–0 | 2–0 | 2002 Asian Games |
| 6. | 9 June 2003 | Rajamangala Stadium, Bangkok, Thailand | Philippines | 4–0 | 15–0 | 2003 AFC Women's Championship |
| 7. | 9 June 2003 | Rajamangala Stadium, Bangkok, Thailand | Philippines | 10–0 | 15–0 | 2003 AFC Women's Championship |
| 8. | 13 June 2003 | Rajamangala Stadium, Bangkok, Thailand | Myanmar | 3–0 | 7–0 | 2003 AFC Women's Championship |
| 9. | 13 June 2003 | Rajamangala Stadium, Bangkok, Thailand | Myanmar | 7–0 | 7–0 | 2003 AFC Women's Championship |
| 10. | 15 June 2003 | Rajamangala Stadium, Bangkok, Thailand | Chinese Taipei | 2–0 | 5–0 | 2003 AFC Women's Championship |
| 12. | 22 April 2004 | National Olympic Stadium, Tokyo, Japan | Thailand | 4–0 | 6–0 | 2004 Summer Olympics qualification |
