= Ra Mi-ae =

North Korean footballer

Personal information
- Date of birth: 8 December 1975 (age 50)
- Position: Defender

International career^{‡}
| Years | Team | Apps | (Gls) |
| | North Korea | 3 | (0) |
- ‡ National team caps and goals as of 29 September 2003

Ra Mi-ae (born 8 December 1975, Korean: 라미애) is a North Korean women's international footballer who plays as a defender. She is a member of the North Korea women's national football team. She was part of the team at the 2003 FIFA Women's World Cup.

== Personal life ==
Ra Mi-ae lived in a rural area. Her parents were against her playing football because they considered their daughter to be their "little princess", but they later allowed her to play. She also dealt with resistance from people who said that she was too short to play sports. She was inspired by Argentine footballer Diego Maradona because he was not that much taller than her and become famous across the world. Ra Mi-ae was able to play soccer when coaches saw her talent.

== Career ==
Ra Mi-ae and three other North Korean women footballers – Ri Jong Hi, Jin Pyol Hi, and Ri Hyang-ok – were featured in an Austrian documentary directed by Brigitte Weich titled Hana, dul, sed. The people who worked on the documentary said that it was a gut feeling on who they chose for it, with Ra-Mi-ae being the "small defender with the dirty voice". A description of the film stated that Ra Mi-ae and the other three players were "instrumental in the meteoric rise of North Korean women's football to figure among the best in the world."

Ri Hyang-ok and Ra Mi-ae were best friends, and Ri Hyang-ok said, "People used to call us "spies" because we always stuck together". There were a few defenders on their team who believed that Ri Hyang-ok spent more time defending the position of Ra Mi-ae than anyone else, and Ri Hyang-ok said that it was probably true.
