= Jang Ok-gyong =

North Korean footballer (born 1980)

Personal information
- Date of birth: 29 January 1980 (age 46)
- Position: Defender

International career^{‡}
| Years | Team | Apps | (Gls) |
| | North Korea | 3 | (0) |
- ‡ National team caps and goals as of 29 September 2003

Jang Ok-gyong (Korean: 장옥경; born 29 January 1980) is a North Korean women's international footballer who plays as a defender. She is a member of the North Korea women's national football team. She was part of the team at the 1999 FIFA Women's World Cup and 2003 FIFA Women's World Cup.

== International goals ==
| No. | Date | Venue | Opponent | Score | Result | Competition |
|---|---|---|---|---|---|---|
| 1. | 14 June 2003 | Rajamangala Stadium, Bangkok, Thailand | Singapore | 11–0 | 16–0 | 2003 AFC Women's Championship |
