= Yun Yong-hui =

North Korean footballer

Personal information
- Date of birth: 18 March 1977 (age 49)
- Position: Midfielder

International career^{‡}
| Years | Team | Apps | (Gls) |
| | North Korea | 3 | (0) |
- ‡ National team caps and goals as of 29 September 2003

Yun Yong-hui (윤영희) (born 18 March 1977) is a North Korean women's international footballer who plays as a midfielder. She is a member of the North Korea women's national football team. She was part of the team at the 2003 FIFA Women's World Cup.

== International goals ==
| No. | Date | Venue | Opponent | Score | Result | Competition |
|---|---|---|---|---|---|---|
| 1. | 11 October 2002 | Changwon, South Korea | Vietnam | 4–0 | 4–0 | 2002 Asian Games |
| 2. | 10 June 2003 | Bangkok, Thailand | Hong Kong | 3–0 | 13–0 | 2003 AFC Women's Championship |
| 3. | 10 June 2003 | Bangkok, Thailand | Hong Kong | 4–0 | 13–0 | 2003 AFC Women's Championship |
| 4. | 12 June 2003 | Bangkok, Thailand | Thailand | 12–0 | 14–0 | 2003 AFC Women's Championship |
| 5. | 12 June 2003 | Bangkok, Thailand | Thailand | 14–0 | 14–0 | 2003 AFC Women's Championship |
| 6. | 16 June 2003 | Bangkok, Thailand | South Korea | 1–1 | 2–2 | 2003 AFC Women's Championship |
| 7. | 18 February 2004 | Brisbane, Australia | China | 3–0 | 3–0 | 2004 Australia Cup |
| 8. | 24 February 2004 | Brisbane, Australia | New Zealand | 2–0 | 11–0 | 2004 Australia Cup |
| 9. | 18 April 2004 | Hiroshima, Japan | Chinese Taipei | 3–0 | 5–0 | 2004 Summer Olympics qualification |
