= Teng Wei =

Chinese footballer

Teng Wei (Chinese: 滕巍; pinyin: Téng Wēi; born May 21, 1974, in Changchun, Jilin) is a female Chinese football (soccer) player who competed at the 2004 Summer Olympics.

In 2004, she finished ninth with the Chinese team in the women's tournament. She played both matches.
