= Mayumi Oiwa =

Japanese football referee (born 1972)

- Born: April 11, 1972 (age 54); Muroran, Hokkaidō, Japan
- Other occupation: Receptionist

Domestic
Years	League	Role
1999-2002	L. League	Referee
2002-	Japan Football League	Referee

International
Years	League	Role
2002-	FIFA listed	Referee

Mayumi Oiwa (大岩真由美, Ōiwa Mayumi) (born April 11, 1972, in Muroran, Hokkaidō) is a Japanese football referee.

She became a first class referee in 1999 and began officiating games in the L. League and was placed on the FIFA list of international referees in 2002.

Her first international tournament was the 2002 FIFA U-19 Women's World Championship in which she officiated two games including the third place play-off. Following her performance in the 2004 FIFA U-19 Women's World Championship, in which she refereed a Quarter final match, Oiwa was promoted to the Japan Football League.

She became the first female referee to officiate in the 84th Nationwide Highschool soccer championship conference on January 22, 2006, and then refereed the final at the 2006 AFC Women's Championship. Selected by FIFA to officiate in the 2007 FIFA Women's World Cup in China, she refereed two games and was fourth official in the Final between Germany and Brazil.
