= Pak Kum-chun =

North Korean footballer

Personal information
- Date of birth: 22 February 1978 (age 48)
- Position: Forward

International career^{‡}
Years	Team	Apps	(Gls)
- North Korea
- ‡ National team caps and goals as of 20 September 2003 (before the 2003 FIFA Women's World Cup)

Pak Kum-chun (born 22 February 1978, Korean: 박금춘) is a North Korean women's international footballer who plays as a forward. She is a member of the North Korea women's national football team. She was part of the team at the 2003 FIFA Women's World Cup. She was awarded the title of Merited Athlete by the dprk gov.
