= Lee Myung-hwa =

South Korean footballer

Personal information
- Date of birth: July 29, 1973 (age 53)
- Place of birth: Uljin, North Gyeongsang, South Korea
- Positions: Forward; defender

Youth career
- Kyung Hee University

Senior career*
Years	Team	Apps	(Gls)
?–2003	Hyundai Steel Red Angels		
2004–?	Seoul Amazones		

International career
1990–2004	Korea Republic	81	(10)
Medal record
Women's football
Representing South Korea
Universiade
Bronze medal – third place	2001 Beijing	Team
- * Club domestic league appearances and goals

- Lee Myung-hwa
- Hangul: 이명화
- Hanja: 李明花
- RR: I Myeonghwa
- MR: I Myŏnghwa

Lee Myung-hwa (Korean: 이명화, Korean pronunciation: [i.mjʌŋ.ɦwa]; born July 29, 1973) is a former South Korean football player who was a member of South Korea women's national football team.

She was a foil fencer up until February 1990. In 1990, she joined women's football; soon she was one of the first members of South Korea women's national football team. Her international football debut occurred simultaneously with the team's first-ever official match.

== Honours ==
- Player of the Year (Women) : 2002
