= Qu Feifei =

Chinese footballer

Personal information
- Date of birth: May 18, 1982 (age 44)
- Place of birth: Shenyang, Liaoning, China
- Position: Midfielder
Medal record
Women's football
Representing China
Asian Games
| Bronze medal – third place | 2006 Doha | Team |

Qu Feifei (simplified Chinese: 曲飞飞; traditional Chinese: 曲飛飛; pinyin: Qǔ Fēifēi; born May 18, 1982, in Shenyang, Liaoning) is a Chinese football (soccer) player who competed at the 2004 Summer Olympics.

In 2004, she finished ninth with the Chinese team in the women's tournament. She played both matches.
