= Ri Hyang-ok =

North Korean footballer and referee

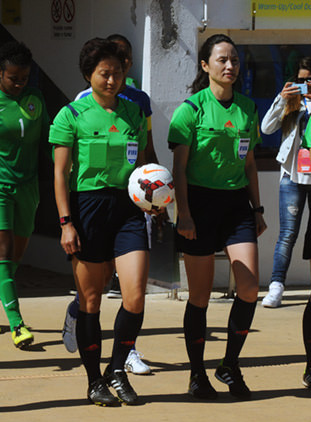
- Ri Hyang-ok (right) at the 2015 Algarve Cup

Personal information
- Date of birth: 18 December 1977 (age 48)
- Place of birth: Pyongyang, North Korea
- Position: Midfielder

International career
Years	Team	Apps	(Gls)
–2004	North Korea	3	(0)
Refereeing career
International
Years	League	Role
2005–	FIFA listed	Referee

- Ri Hyang-ok
- Hangul: 리향옥
- RR: Ri Hyangok
- MR: Ri Hyangok

Ri Hyang-ok (Korean: 리향옥; born 18 December 1977) is a North Korean association football referee and former footballer. She played as a midfielder and was a member of the North Korea women's national football team. She was part of the team at the 1999 FIFA Women's World Cup and 2003 FIFA Women's World Cup. Since 2005 she has been a FIFA listed referee, and was chosen to officiate at the 2019 FIFA Women's World Cup in France.

== International goals ==
No.	Date	Venue	Opponent	Score	Result	Competition
1.	7 October 2002	Changwon, South Korea	Chinese Taipei	1–0	1–0	2002 Asian Games
2.	9 October 2002	Busan, South Korea	South Korea	1–0	2–0	2002 Asian Games
3.	14 June 2003	Bangkok, Thailand	Singapore	15–0	16–0	2003 AFC Women's Championship
4.	24 February 2004	Brisbane, Australia	New Zealand	3–0	11–0	2004 Australia Cup
5.	18 April 2004	Hiroshima, Japan	Chinese Taipei	2–0	5–0	2004 Summer Olympics qualification
6.	20 April 2004	Hiroshima, Japan	Hong Kong	6–0	9–0	2004 Summer Olympics qualification
7.	26 April 2004	Hiroshima, Japan	South Korea	3–1	5–1	2004 Summer Olympics qualification
8.	26 April 2004	Hiroshima, Japan	South Korea	4–1	5–1	2004 Summer Olympics qualification
