= Changwon Stadium =

Sports venue in Changwon, South Korea

- Orange Stadium
- Interactive map of Changwon Stadium
- Location: Doodae-Dong, Changwon, Gyeongsangnam-do, South Korea
- Coordinates: 35.233867°N 128.664697°E
- Operator: Changwon City Facilities Management Corporation
- Capacity: 27,085
- Surface: Natural grass, running track

Construction
- Groundbreaking: 8 December 1989
- Opened: 19 March 1993
- Cost: 20 billion KRW

Tenants
- Gyeongnam FC (2006–2009); Changwon City FC

The Changwon Stadium (Korean: 창원종합운동장) is a group of sports facilities in Changwon, South Korea. The complex consists of the Changwon Stadium, Changwon Gymnasium and a swimming pool.

== Facilities ==
=== Changwon Stadium ===
Changwon Stadium (Korean: 창원스포츠파크 주경기장) is a multi-use stadium in Changwon, South Korea. It is currently used mostly for football matches. The stadium holds 27,085 people and was built in 1993.

It served as the home ground of K League side Gyeongnam FC and the Korea National League side Changwon City FC prior to the construction of the Changwon Football Center in 2009.

==== 2007 U-17 World Cup ====
The stadium was one of the venues of the 2007 U-17 World Cup, and held the following matches:

Date	Team	Result	Team	Round
20 August	Belgium	2–4	Tunisia	Group E
20 August	Tajikistan	4–3	United States	Group E
23 August	United States	1–3	Tunisia	Group E
23 August	Tajikistan	0–1	Belgium	Group E
26 August	Germany	5–0	Trinidad and Tobago	Group F
29 August	Tunisia	1–3	France	Second Round
1 September	Peru	0–2	Ghana	Quarter-final

=== Changwon Gymnasium ===
Changwon Gymnasium is home of Changwon LG Sakers in the Korean Basketball League.

== See also ==
- Changwon Football Center
