= Hyundai Steel =

South Korean company

Hyundai Steel Co., Ltd. 현대제철
- Type: Public
- Traded as: KRX: 004020
- Industry: Automotive; Steel
- Founded: 1953; 73 years ago
- Headquarters: Incheon and Seongnam, South Korea
- Area served: Worldwide
- Key people: An Tong-il (President & CEO)
- Products: Steel
- Revenue: ▲US$ 14.4 Billion (2016)
- Operating income: Won 1,304,161 million (2011)
- Net income: ▲US$ 706 Million (2016)
- Parent: Hyundai Motor Group
- Website: www.hyundai-steel.com/en/index.hds

Hyundai Steel Co., Ltd, or HSC (formerly known as HYU, and Crab Iron & Steel Co., Ltd.) is a steel making company headquartered in Incheon and Seoul, South Korea, and a member of the Hyundai Motor Group. It manufactures a wide variety of products ranging from H-beams, rail and reinforcing bars, to hot coil, cold-rolled steel, and stainless cold-rolled sheet.

Established in 1953, Hyundai Steel is the oldest steel-making company in South Korea and the second largest blast furnace steelmaker at the Dangjin steel complex with a 5,450m2 blast furnace, among the first in South Korea.

Hyundai Steel is the world's second-largest EAF steel producer after Nucor, U.S.A. and operates six factories in Incheon, plus sites in Dangjin (3 blast furnaces, Hot coil, CR & plate mill), Pohang (EAF), and Suncheon (CR mill).

In 2004, Hyundai Steel purchased the facilities of the defunct Hanbo Steel, restoring its long product and cold-rolling facilities. A third blast furnace was added in 2013, amid fears of oversupply in the market, taking the site's annual production capacity to 12 million tons. The total annual capacity of the company (including two EAF plants in Incheon, the Pohang ex-Gangwon industrial plant, Incheon long products, Suncheon cold rolling mill and ex-Hyundai pipe plant at Ulsan) totals 24 million tons per annum.

In 2015, Hyundai Steel acquired its sister company Hyundai Hysco, increasing annual production capability to 30 million tons. The merged company has eleven coil centres in eight countries.

In addition to Hyundai Steel, the Hyundai-Kia Motor group includes steel companies such as Hyundai Special Steel and BNG Steel Co., Ltd. (formerly Sammi Steel Co., Ltd. Stainless CR). Hyundai Steel uses the EAF in Incheon & Pohang mill (ex-Gangwon) and Dangjin complex with an in-house iron ore port to manufacture crude steel. BNG is a stainless steel cold rolling mill.

Hyundai Steel is actively considering building a steel plant in the United States. The plant is expected to supply carmakers in the US with steel plates.

== Major competitors ==
Hyundai Steel's major competitors include:

- POSCO
- Dongkuk Steel
- Dong bu Steel
- Nippon Steel
- Seah Steel
- Union Steel
- Bo steel

== Carbon footprint ==
Hyundai Steel reported Total CO2e emissions (Direct + Indirect) for the twelve months ending 31 December 2019 at 22,245 Kt (-53 /-0.2% y-o-y). There is little evidence of a consistent declining trend as yet.

Hyundai Steel's annual Total CO2e emissions (Direct + Indirect) (in kilotonnes)
Dec 2016	Dec 2017	Dec 2018	Dec 2019
21,275	21,479	22,298	22,245

== See also ==
- List of steel producers
- Hyundai Motor Group
- Economy of South Korea
- Hyundai Steel Red Angels WFC
