= Football at the 2002 Asian Games – Women's tournament =

Women at the 2002 Asian Games
- Venue: Changwon Stadium; Gudeok Stadium; Yangsan Stadium; Masan Stadium
- Date: 2–11 October
- Competitors: 108 from 6 nations

Medalists
gold medal	North Korea
silver medal	China
bronze medal	Japan

The women's football tournament at the 2002 Asian Games was held from 2 October to 11 October 2002 in Busan, South Korea.

== Venues ==
Busan	Changwon		Yangsan
Gudeok Stadium	Changwon Stadium	Masan Stadium	Yangsan Stadium
Capacity: 12,349	Capacity: 27,085	Capacity: 21,484	Capacity: 22,061

== Results ==
All times are Korea Standard Time (UTC+09:00)

Pos	Team	Pld	W	D	L	GF	GA	GD	Pts
1	North Korea	5	4	1	0	8	0	+8	13
2	China	5	3	2	0	11	3	+8	11
3	Japan	5	3	1	1	8	3	+5	10
4	South Korea	5	2	0	3	6	8	−2	6
5	Chinese Taipei	5	0	1	4	2	7	−5	1
6	Vietnam	5	0	1	4	2	16	−14	1

Source: RSSSF
2 October
17:03

South Korea	4–0	Vietnam
Hwang In-sun 17'; Kwak Mi-hee 31'; Lee Ji-eun 43'; Cha Sung-mi 55'

Changwon Stadium, Changwon

2 October
17:03

Chinese Taipei	0–1	China
		Fan Yunjie 4'

Gudeok Stadium, Busan

2 October
19:23

Japan	0–1	North Korea
		Jin Pyol-hui 87'

Gudeok Stadium, Busan

4 October
17:03

Japan	3–0	Vietnam
Otani 23', 43'; Sawa 89'

Changwon Stadium, Changwon

4 October
17:03

Chinese Taipei	1–2	South Korea
Chen Shu-chiung 50'		Hong Kyung-suk 25'; Jung Jung-suk 48'

Yangsan Stadium, Yangsan

4 October
19:23

North Korea	0–0	China

Changwon Stadium, Changwon

7 October
17:03

South Korea	0–1	Japan
		Sawa 15'

Masan Stadium, Changwon

7 October
17:03

China	4–1	Vietnam
Ren Liping 3', 46'; Gao Hongxia 16'; Bai Jie 53'		Quách Thanh Mai 19'

Gudeok Stadium, Busan

7 October
19:23

Chinese Taipei	0–1	North Korea
		Ri Hyang-ok 55'

Masan Stadium, Changwon

9 October
17:03

Chinese Taipei	1–1	Vietnam
Chen Shu-chiung 88'		Đoàn Thị Kim Chi 70'

Yangsan Stadium, Yangsan

9 October
17:03

China	2–2	Japan
Bai Jie 48', 56'		Miyamoto 19'; Sawa 28'

Changwon Stadium, Changwon

9 October
19:03

North Korea	2–0	South Korea
Ri Hyang-ok 26'; Jin Pyol-hui 36'

Gudeok Stadium, Busan

11 October
15:03

Vietnam	0–4	North Korea
		Jin Pyol-hui 17', 43'; Ri Kum-suk 65'; Yun Yong-hui 74'

Changwon Stadium, Changwon

11 October
15:03

Chinese Taipei	0–2	Japan
		Kobayashi 11'; Miyazaki 14'

Masan Stadium, Changwon

11 October
17:23

South Korea	0–4	China
		Li Jie 14'; Zhao Lihong 64'; Ren Liping 69'; Meng Jun 85'

Changwon Stadium, Changwon

== Goalscorers ==
4 goals

- Jin Pyol-hui (PRK)

3 goals

- Bai Jie (CHN)
- Ren Liping (CHN)
- Homare Sawa (JPN)

2 goals

- Mio Otani (JPN)
- Ri Hyang-ok (PRK)
- Chen Shu-chiung (TPE)

1 goal

- Fan Yunjie (CHN)
- Gao Hongxia (CHN)
- Li Jie (CHN)
- Meng Jun (CHN)
- Zhao Lihong (CHN)
- Yayoi Kobayashi (JPN)
- Tomomi Miyamoto (JPN)
- Yuka Miyazaki (JPN)
- Cha Sung-mi (KOR)
- Hong Kyung-suk (KOR)
- Hwang In-sun (KOR)
- Jung Jung-suk (KOR)
- Kwak Mi-hee (KOR)
- Lee Ji-eun (KOR)
- Ri Kum-suk (PRK)
- Yun Yong-hui (PRK)
- Đoàn Thị Kim Chi (VIE)
- Quách Thanh Mai (VIE)

== Final standing ==
Rank	Team	Pld	W	D	L	GF	GA	GD	Pts
1st place, gold medalist(s)	North Korea	5	4	1	0	8	0	+8	13
2nd place, silver medalist(s)	China	5	3	2	0	11	3	+8	11
3rd place, bronze medalist(s)	Japan	5	3	1	1	8	3	+5	10
4	South Korea	5	2	0	3	6	8	−2	6
5	Chinese Taipei	5	0	1	4	2	7	−5	1
6	Vietnam	5	0	1	4	2	16	−14	1
