= North Korea women's national football team =

Women's national association football team representing North Korea

Korea DPR
- Nickname: Eastern Azaleas
- Association: DPR Korea Football Association
- Confederation: AFC (Asia)
- Sub-confederation: EAFF (East Asia)
- Head coach: Pak Song-jin
- Captain: An Kuk-hyang
- Most caps: Ri Kum-suk (123)
- Top scorer: Ri Kum-suk (40)
- Home stadium: Rungnado Stadium; Kim Il-Sung Stadium; Yanggakdo Stadium
- FIFA code: PRK
First colours	Second colours

FIFA ranking
- Current: 11 (16 June 2026)
- Highest: 5 (December 2006 – June 2007; September 2008 – March 2010)
- Lowest: 12 (July 2011)

First international
- China 4–1 North Korea (Hong Kong; 21 December 1989)

Biggest win
- North Korea 24–0 Singapore (Hong Kong; 21 June 2001)

Biggest defeat
- France 5–0 North Korea (Glasgow, Scotland; 28 July 2012)

World Cup
- Appearances: 5 (first in 1999)
- Best result: Quarter-finals (2007)

Olympic Games
- Appearances: 2 (first in 2008)
- Best result: Group stage (2008, 2012)

Asian Cup
- Appearances: 10 (first in 1989)
- Best result: Winners (2001, 2003, 2008)
Medal record
Women's football
AFC Women's Asian Cup
Gold medal – first place	2001 Taiwan
Gold medal – first place	2003 Thailand
Gold medal – first place	2008 Vietnam
Silver medal – second place	1993 Malaysia
Silver medal – second place	1997 China
Silver medal – second place	2010 China	Team
Asian Games
Gold medal – first place	2002 Busan	Team
Gold medal – first place	2006 Doha	Team
Gold medal – first place	2014 Incheon	Team
Silver medal – second place	1998 Bangkok	Team
Silver medal – second place	2010 Guangzhou	Team
Silver medal – second place	2022 Hangzhou	Team
Bronze medal – third place	1990 Beijing	Team

The North Korea women's national football team (Munhwaŏ Korean: 조선민주주의인민공화국 녀자 국가종합팀, recognized as Korea DPR by FIFA) represents North Korea in international women's football.

North Korea is one of the Asian Football Confederation women's powerhouses alongside Japan, China and Australia. The Eastern Azaleas won the AFC Women's Asian Cup in 2001 (scoring 53 goals in 6 matches, a record that still stands), 2003, and 2008, and reached the quarterfinals of the 2007 FIFA Women's World Cup.

== History ==
=== 1980s ===
According to data from the Korean Central News Agency, women's football in the country began to take shape in 1985. The first football team was formed in the Society of Provincial Sports of South Pyongan Province (Korean: 평안남도체육선수단), and other women's football teams started emerging soon after. On May 19, 1986, the first exhibition match of women's football teams was played at the Kim Il Sung Stadium in Pyongyang.

The first national match of the North Korean national team was held on December 21, 1989, against the Chinese national team as part of the 1989 AFC Women's Championship. The match, which took place in Hong Kong, ended in a 1–4 defeat for the Koreans. Later in the same tournament, the national team played two more matches, losing 1–3 to Chinese Taipei and winning 4–0 against Thailand, thus finishing third in their group. In the following year, in 1990, the North Korean national team won their first international medal, securing bronze medals at the Women's Football Tournament of the 1990 Asian Games in Beijing. They only suffered one loss to the Chinese team during the tournament and achieved a 7–0 victory against the South Korean national team.

The 1991 AFC Women's Championship in Japan, in addition to its primary purpose, served as a qualification stage for the 1991 FIFA Women's World Cup, with the top three East Asian teams earning a spot in the World Cup. The North Korean national team had a successful start in the tournament, finishing second in their subgroup, which qualified them for the semi-finals. In the semi-final match, the Koreans were defeated by the Chinese team with a score of 0–1. In the match for third place, they faced the Chinese Taipei team. The regular and extra time of the match ended in a goalless draw, and the winner was determined in a penalty shootout, in which the North Korean national team lost 4–5, finishing fourth in the tournament and narrowly missing qualification for the World Cup. The 1993 AFC Women's Championship brought silver medals to the North Korean team, as they only lost the final match to the Chinese team with a score of 3–0. The North Korean team missed the 1995 FIFA Women's World Cup tournament as they were absent from the 1994 Asian Games held in Hiroshima, which served as a parallel qualification for the World Cup. The North Korean national team was also absent from the 1995 AFC Women's Championship.

For the first time in their history, the Korean women's team secured a spot in the World Cup after finishing as runners-up in the 1997 AFC Women's Championship. In the semi-finals, they defeated the Japanese national team with a score of 1–0. In the final match, they faced the Chinese team once more and were defeated 0–2. At the 1998 Asian Games, the North Korean national team reached the final again but lost 0–1 to their Chinese counterparts. In their first World Cup, the North Korean team was placed in a group with Nigeria, Denmark, and the tournament hosts, the United States. They lost their first match against Nigeria 1–2, but bounced back in the second match to defeat the Danish team 3–1. A 0–3 loss to the United States in the final group-stage match left the North Korean team in third place in the group, preventing them from reaching the tournament's knockout stage.

=== Disqualification from 2015 FIFA Women's World Cup ===
During the team's participation at the 2011 FIFA Women's World Cup, on 7 July 2011, FIFA announced that two of its players, Song Jong-Sun and Jong Pok-Sim, had failed doping tests during the tournament and were provisionally suspended prior to their team's match against Colombia. On 16 July, FIFA announced that three additional players from North Korea tested positive following target testing of the whole team. North Korea reasoned the positive doping results stemmed from deer musk-derived Chinese traditional medicine used to treat players hit by lightning. On 25 August 2011, the North Korean team was fined US$400,000 which is equal to the prize it received by finishing 13th in the 2011 tournament, and was excluded from participation at the 2015 FIFA Women's World Cup, including its qualification round.

=== 2020s ===
After it won the 2019 Cyprus Women's Cup in March 2019, the team was inactive until the 2022 Asian Games (played in September 2023) partially due to the COVID-19 pandemic; during this time, the team became unranked due to a lack of FIFA-recognized play. The team's ranking has since been restored. North Korea almost qualified for the 2024 Summer Olympics, losing to Japan in the two-leg third round Olympic qualifiers.

As of the June 2024 FIFA rankings, the team is ranked 10th in the world.

== Results and fixtures ==
The following is a list of match results in the last 12 months, as well as any future matches that have been scheduled.

Legend

Win Draw Loss Fixtures

=== 2025 ===
27 November Friendly	North Korea	5–2	Russia	Pyongyang, North Korea
15:00 UTC+9	Ri Myong-gum 19'; Myong Yu-jong 30', 60' (pen.); Han Jin-hong 73'; Kim Song-gyong 87'	Report	Zharkova 8'; Kozhnikova 50'	Stadium: Kim Il Sung Stadium

30 November Friendly	North Korea	1–1	Russia	Pyongyang, North Korea
15:00 UTC+9	Ri Hak 90'	Report	Butkevich 34'	Stadium: Kim Il Sung Stadium

=== 2026 ===
3 March AFC Women's Asian Cup GS	North Korea	3–0	Uzbekistan	Sydney, Australia
13:00 UTC+11	Myong Yu-jong 6', 24' (pen.), 41' (pen.)	Report (AFC); Report (FIFA)		Stadium: Western Sydney Stadium; Attendance: 1,268; Referee: Casey Reibelt (Australia)

6 March AFC Women's Asian Cup GS	Bangladesh	0–5	North Korea	Sydney, Australia
13:00 UTC+11		Report (AFC); Report (FIFA)	Myong Yu-jong 45+5' (pen.); Kim Kyong-yong 45+7', 64'; Chae Un-yong 62'; Kim Hye-yong 90'	Stadium: Western Sydney Stadium; Attendance: 2,102; Referee: Doumouh Al Bakkar (Lebanon)

9 March AFC Women's Asian Cup GS	North Korea	1–2	China	Sydney, Australia
20:00 UTC+11	Kim Kyong-yong 32'	Report (AFC); Report (FIFA)	Chen Qiaozhu 34'; Wang Shuang 45+4'	Stadium: Western Sydney Stadium; Attendance: 9,093; Referee: Lê Thị Ly (Vietnam)

13 March AFC Women's Asian Cup QF	Australia	2–1	North Korea	Perth, Australia
18:00 UTC+8	Kennedy 9'; Kerr 47'	Report (AFC); Report (FIFA)	Chae Un-yong 65'	Stadium: Perth Rectangular Stadium; Attendance: 16,466; Referee: Veronika Bernatskaia (Kyrgyzstan)

19 March AFC Women's Asian Cup PI	North Korea	4–0	Chinese Taipei	Gold Coast, Australia
19:00 UTC+10	Hong Song-ok 32', 49', 68'; Kim Kyong-yong 52'	Report (AFC); Report (FIFA)		Stadium: Gold Coast Stadium; Attendance: 2,684; Referee: Asaka Koizumi (Japan)

14 September 2026 Asian Games GS	North Korea	10–0	Bangladesh	Osaka, Japan
16:00 UTC+9	Jon Ryong-Jong 5', 10'; Hwang Yu-Yong 12'; Chae Un-Yong 18', 35'; Kim Kyong-yong 40', 43'; Ri Song-a 51'; Jong Kum 60'; Han Jin-Hong 90'	Report		Stadium: Nagai Stadium; Attendance: 1,343; Referee: Plong Pich Akara (Cambodia)

17 September 2026 Asian Games GS	Myanmar	0–8	North Korea	Osaka, Japan
19:30 UTC+9		Report	Ri Myong-gum 10'; Ri Song-a 18' (pen.); Khin Marlar Tun 37' (o.g.); Jon Ryong-jong 40', 42'; Choe Kum-ok 58', 77'; Jong Kum 66'	Stadium: Nagai Stadium; Attendance: 855; Referee: Mu Mingxin (China)

21 September 2026 Asian Games GS	South Korea	1–1	North Korea	Fukuroi, Japan
16:00 UTC+9	Yun Su-jeong 46'	Report	Chae Un-yong 35'	Stadium: Shizuoka Stadium; Attendance: 2,032; Referee: Supiree Testhomya (Thailand)

25 September 2026 Asian Games QF	North Korea	5–1	Chinese Taipei	Fukuroi, Japan
15:00 UTC+9	Song Chun-sim 21'; Myong Ju-yong 29'; Kim Kyong-yong 34'; Choe Kum-ok 64'; Kim Song-gyong 86'	Report	Chen Yu-chin 90+2'	Stadium: Shizuoka Stadium; Attendance: 477; Referee: Veronika Bernatskaia (Kyrgyzstan)

29 September 2026 Asian Games SF	North Korea	2–0	China	Fukuroi, Japan
15:00 UTC+9	Yao Wei 53' (o.g.); Myong Yu-jong 79'	Report		Stadium: Shizuoka Stadium; Attendance: 564; Referee: Veronika Bernatskaia (Kyrgyzstan)

2 October 2026 Asian Games Final	North Korea	2–2 (a.e.t.) (3–5 p)	Japan	Fukuroi, Japan
19:30 UTC+9	Jong Kum 47'; Jon Ryong-jong 69'	Report	Ueno 32'; Nishio 86'	Stadium: Shizuoka Stadium; Attendance: 6,243; Referee: Supiree Testhomya (Thailand)
	Penalties
	Myong Yu-jong (penalty scored); Jon Ryong-jong (penalty scored); Jong Kum (penalty missed); Ri Hye-gyong (penalty scored)		(penalty scored) Takarada; (penalty scored) Mizuno; (penalty scored) Kuwahara; (penalty scored) Nishio; (penalty scored) Shiokoshi

=== 2027 ===
19 April 2028 Olympic Qualifiers	North Korea	v	Philippines
		Report

24 April 2028 Olympic Qualifiers	South Korea	v	North Korea	South Korea
		Report

June 2027 World Cup GS	North Korea	v	TBD	Brazil

June/July 2027 World Cup GS	North Korea	v	TBD	Brazil

July 2027 World Cup GS	North Korea	v	TBD	Brazil

7 October 2028 Olympic Qualifiers	North Korea	v	China
		Report

12 October 2028 Olympic Qualifiers	China	v	North Korea	China
		Report

29 November 2028 Olympic Qualifiers	Philippines	v	North Korea	Philippines
		Report

4 December 2028 Olympic Qualifiers	North Korea	v	South Korea
		Report

== Coaching staff ==
=== Current coaching staff ===
As of 14 September 2026

Role	Name
Head coach	Pak Song-jin
Assistant coach	Jang Ok-gyong; Ri Hyong-jin; Sin Jae-nam
Goalkeeping coach	Jong Sok-nam
Team Doctor	Pak Kyong-hui

=== Manager history ===
Name	Period	Tournament
(North Korea) Myong Dong-chan	1989–1999	1991 AFC Women's Championship: Fourth place 1993 AFC Women's Championship: (silver) Second place 1997 AFC Women's Championship: (silver) Second place 1998 Asian Games: (silver) Silver medal 1999 FIFA Women's World Cup: Group stage
(North Korea) Ri Song-gun	1999–2003	1999 AFC Women's Championship: (bronze) Third Place; 2001 AFC Women's Championship: Champions; 2002 Asian Games: (gold) Gold medal 2003 AFC Women's Championship: Champions; 2003 FIFA Women's World Cup: Group stage
(North Korea) Kim Kwang-min	2004–2011	2005 EAFF Women's Football Championship: (silver) Second place 2006 AFC Women's Asian Cup: (bronze) Third Place; 2006 Asian Games: (gold) Gold medal 2007 FIFA Women's World Cup: Quarter-finalists; 2008 EAFF Women's Football Championship: (silver) Second place 2008 AFC Women's Asian Cup: Champions; 2010 AFC Women's Asian Cup: (silver) Second place 2010 Asian Games (silver) Silver medal 2011 FIFA Women's World Cup: Group stage
(North Korea) Sin Ui-gun	2012	2012 Summer Olympics: Group stage
(North Korea) Kim Kwang-min	2013–2019	2013 EAFF Women's East Asian Cup: Champions; 2014 Asian Games: (gold) Gold medal 2015 EAFF Women's East Asian Cup: Champions; 2017 EAFF E-1 Football Championship: Champions
(North Korea) Jo Song-ok (caretaker)	2016	
(North Korea) Ri Yu-il	2023–2024	2022 Asian Games: (silver) Silver medal
(North Korea) Ri Song-ho	2025–2026	
(North Korea) Pak Song-jin	2026–present	2026 Asian Games: (silver) Silver medal

== Players ==
=== Current squad ===
The following 23 players were called up for the 2026 Asian Games.

- Caps and goals correct as of: 2 October 2026, after the match against Japan

No.	Pos.	Player	Date of birth (age)	Caps	Goals	Club
1	GK	Pak Ju-mi	1 July 2003 (age 23)	9	0	(DPR Korea Football Association) Naegohyang
18	GK	Yu Son-gum	8 November 2003 (age 23)	19	0	(DPR Korea Football Association) Sobaeksu
21	GK	Chae Un-gyong	29 November 2004 (age 21)	1	0	(DPR Korea Football Association) Pyongyang
2	DF	Ri Myong-gum	1 January 2003 (age 23)	24	3	(DPR Korea Football Association) Naegohyang
3	DF	Ri Kum-hyang	22 April 2001 (age 25)	20	2	(DPR Korea Football Association) Naegohyang
4	DF	Oh Sol-song	30 June 2004 (age 22)	2	0	(DPR Korea Football Association) Sobaeksu
5	DF	An Kuk-hyang (captain)	25 May 2001 (age 25)	13	0	(DPR Korea Football Association) April 25
14	DF	Hwang Yu-yong	13 April 2006 (age 20)	14	1	(DPR Korea Football Association) Amnokgang
16	DF	Song Chun-sim	29 May 2002 (age 24)	10	4	(DPR Korea Football Association) Pyongyang
23	DF	Ri Hye-gyong	24 September 1999 (age 27)	30	1	(DPR Korea Football Association) Amnokgang
6	MF	An Pok-yong	10 January 2002 (age 24)	11	0	(DPR Korea Football Association) Naegohyang
7	MF	Myong Yu-jong	29 August 2003 (age 23)	31	17	(DPR Korea Football Association) April 25
9	MF	Kim Song-gyong	12 February 2005 (age 21)	15	4	(DPR Korea Football Association) Amnokgang
10	MF	Jong Kum	1 June 2004 (age 22)	6	3	(DPR Korea Football Association) Naegohyang
13	MF	Jon Ryong-jong	25 July 2004 (age 22)	11	5	(DPR Korea Football Association) April 25
19	MF	Choe Kum-ok	23 February 2002 (age 24)	9	3	(DPR Korea Football Association) Naegohyang
20	MF	Chae Un-yong	12 April 2004 (age 22)	15	6	(DPR Korea Football Association) Wolmido
22	MF	Kim Hye-yong	11 March 2003 (age 23)	17	9	(DPR Korea Football Association) Naegohyang
8	FW	Ri Song-a	22 June 1999 (age 27)	6	2	(Japan Football Association) Sanfrecce Hiroshima
11	FW	Han Jin-hong	16 February 2002 (age 24)	24	10	(DPR Korea Football Association) April 25
15	FW	Choe Il-son	1 January 2007 (age 19)	8	0	(DPR Korea Football Association) April 25
17	FW	Kim Kyong-yong	2 January 2002 (age 24)	29	33	(DPR Korea Football Association) Naegohyang
12	FW	Hong Song-ok	21 August 2003 (age 23)	28	12	(DPR Korea Football Association) Amnokgang

=== Recent call ups ===
- The following players have been called up to a North Korea squad in the past 12 months.

Pos.	Player	Date of birth (age)	Caps	Goals	Club	Latest call-up
GK	Kim Jong-sun	13 October 2003 (age 23)	0	0	(North Korea) April 25	2026 AFC Women's Asian Cup
DF	Jo Pom-mi	26 March 2003 (age 23)	3	0	(North Korea) April 25	2026 AFC Women's Asian Cup
DF	Jo Kuk-hwa	2002 (age 22-23)	1	0	(North Korea) April 25	v. Russia, 30 November 2025
MF	Kim Un-yong		0	0	(North Korea)	v. Russia, 30 November 2025
FW	Ri Hak	12 June 2002 (age 24)	21	13	(North Korea) April 25	2026 AFC Women's Asian Cup
FW	Sin Hyang	16 July 2005 (age 21)	6	0	(North Korea) Naegohyang	2026 AFC Women's Asian Cup

== Honours ==
=== Major competitions ===
- AFC Women's Asian Cup

Champions: 2001, 2003, 2008
Runners-up: 1993, 1997, 2010

=== Continental ===
- Asian Games

Gold medal: 2002, 2006, 2014
Silver medal: 1998, 2010, 2022, 2026
Bronze medal: 1990

=== Regional ===
- EAFF E-1 Football Championship

Champions: 2013, 2015, 2017
Runners-up: 2005, 2008

=== Friendly ===
- Albena Cup

Champions: 2002

- Australia Cup

Champions: 2004

- Cyprus Women's Cup

Champions: 2019

- Four Nations Tournament

Champions: 2012

== Competitive record ==
=== FIFA Women's World Cup ===
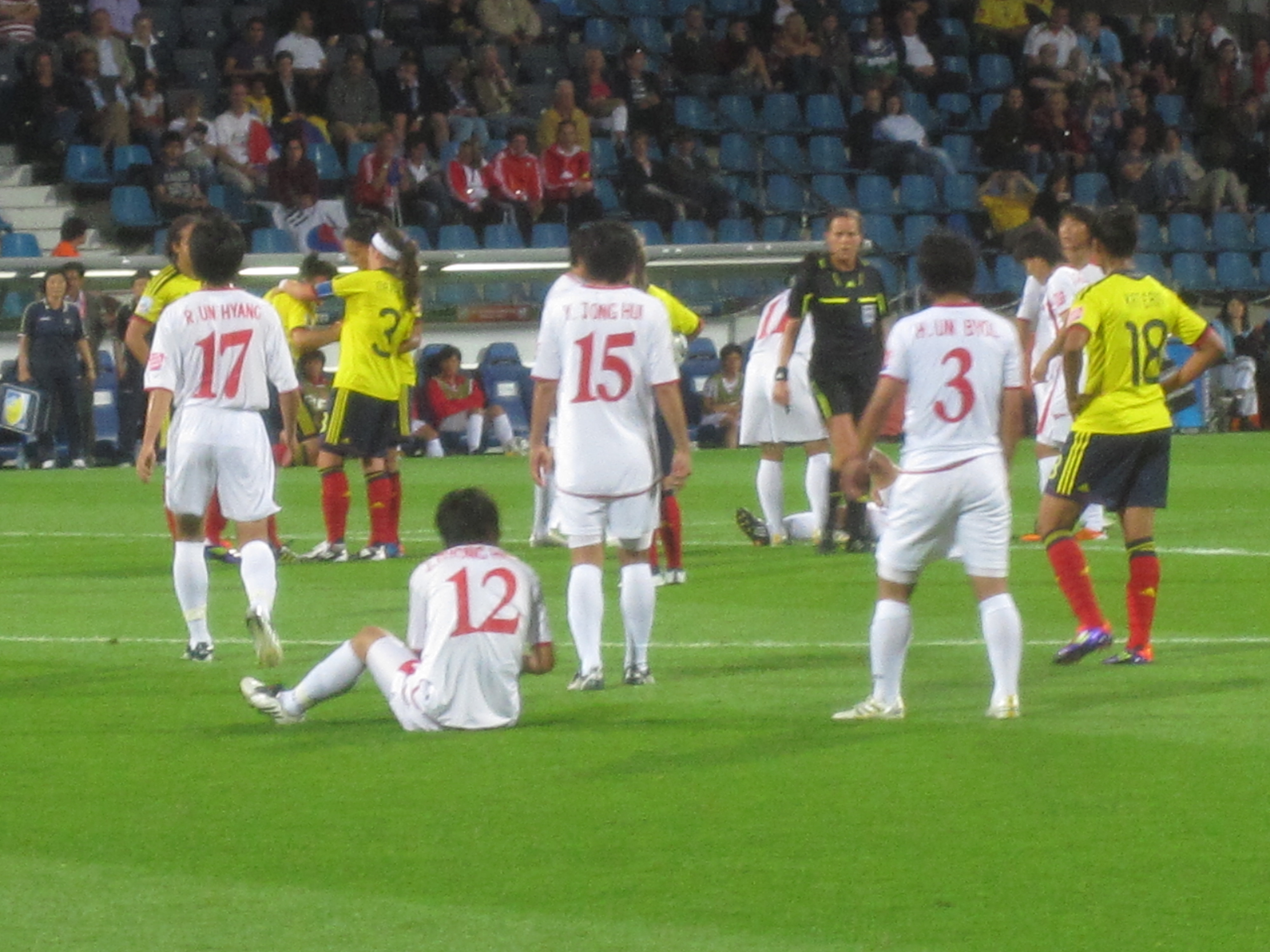
The team at the 2011 FIFA Women's World Cup

FIFA Women's World Cup record
Year	Result	GP	W	D*	L	GF	GA	GD
(China) 1991	Did not qualify							
(Sweden) 1995	Did not enter							
(United States) 1999	Group stage	3	1	0	2	4	6	−2
(United States) 2003	Group stage	3	1	0	2	3	4	−1
(China) 2007	Quarter-finals	4	1	1	2	5	7	−2
(Germany) 2011	Group stage	3	0	1	2	0	3	−3
(Canada) 2015	Banned							
(France) 2019	Did not qualify							
(Australia) (New Zealand) 2023	Did not enter							
(Brazil) 2027	Qualified							
(Costa Rica) (Jamaica) (Mexico) (United States) 2031	To be determined							
(United Kingdom) 2035	To be determined							
Total:5/10	Quarter-finals	13	3	2	8	12	20	−8

*Draws include knockout matches decided on penalty kicks.

FIFA Women's World Cup history
Year	Round	Date	Opponent	Result	Stadium
(United States) 1999	Group stage	20 June	Nigeria	L 1–2	Rose Bowl, Pasadena
(United States) 1999	Group stage	24 June	Denmark	W 3–1	Civic Stadium, Portland
(United States) 1999	Group stage	27 June	United States	L 0–3	Foxboro Stadium, Foxborough
(United States) 2003	Group stage	20 September	Nigeria	W 3–0	Lincoln Financial Field, Philadelphia
(United States) 2003	Group stage	25 September	Sweden	L 0–1	Lincoln Financial Field, Philadelphia
(United States) 2003	Group stage	28 September	United States	L 0–3	Columbus Crew Stadium, Columbus
(China) 2007	Group stage	11 September	United States	D 2–2	Chengdu Sports Center, Chengdu
(China) 2007	Group stage	14 September	Nigeria	W 2–0	Chengdu Sports Center, Chengdu
(China) 2007	Group stage	18 September	Sweden	L 1–2	Tianjin Olympic Centre Stadium, Tianjin
(China) 2007	Quarter-finals	22 September	Germany	L 0–3	Wuhan Stadium, Wuhan
(Germany) 2011	Group stage	28 June	United States	L 0–2	Rudolf-Harbig-Stadion, Dresden
(Germany) 2011	Group stage	2 July	Sweden	L 0–1	Impuls Arena, Augsburg
(Germany) 2011	Group stage	6 July	Colombia	D 0–0	Ruhrstadion, Bochum
(Brazil) 2027	Group stage				

=== Olympic Games ===
Summer Olympics record
Hosts / Year	Result	GP	W	D	L	GS	GA	GD
(United States) 1996	Did not qualify							
(Australia) 2000	Did not qualify							
(Greece) 2004	Did not qualify							
(China) 2008	Group stage	3	1	0	2	2	3	–1
(United Kingdom) 2012	Group stage	3	1	0	2	2	6	–4
(Brazil) 2016	Did not qualify							
(Japan) 2020	Withdrew							
(France) 2024	Did not qualify							
Total:2/8	Group stage	6	2	0	4	4	9	-5

=== AFC Women's Asian Cup ===
AFC Women's Asian Cup									Qualification						
Year	Result	M	W	D	L	GF	GA	GD	M	W	D	L	GF	GA	GD
(Hong Kong) 1975	Did not participate								No Qualification						
(Taiwan) 1977	Did not participate								No Qualification						
(India) 1980	Did not participate								No Qualification						
(Hong Kong) 1981	Did not participate								No Qualification						
1983	Did not participate								No Qualification						
(Hong Kong) 1986	Did not participate								No Qualification						
(Hong Kong) 1989	Group stage	3	1	0	2	6	7	−1	No Qualification						
(Japan) 1991	Fourth place	6	3	1	2	25	2	+23	No Qualification						
(Malaysia) 1993	Runners-up	5	3	1	1	18	4	+14	No Qualification						
(Malaysia) 1995	Did not participate								No Qualification						
(China) 1997	Runners-up	5	3	0	2	24	6	+18	No Qualification						
(Philippines) 1999	Third place	6	4	1	1	28	8	+20	No Qualification						
(Chinese Taipei) 2001	Winners	6	6	0	0	53	1	+52	No Qualification						
2003	Winners	6	5	1	0	50	3	+47	No Qualification						
(Australia) 2006	Third place	6	4	1	1	16	3	+13	Directly Qualified						
(Vietnam) 2008	Winners	5	5	0	0	14	1	+13	Directly Qualified						
(China) 2010	Runners-up	5	3	1	1	7	2	+5	Directly Qualified						
(Vietnam) 2014	Banned (see above)								Banned						
(Jordan) 2018	Did not qualify								4	3	1	0	18	1	+17
(India) 2022	Withdrew								Withdrew						
(Australia) 2026	Quarter-finals	5	3	0	2	14	4	+10	3	3	0	0	26	0	+26
Total:10/21	3 Titles	58	40	6	12	255	41	+214	7	6	1	0	44	1	+43

=== Asian Games ===
Football at the Asian Games
Hosts / Year	Result	M	W	D	L	GF	GA	GD
(China) 1990	(bronze) Bronze medal	5	2	2	1	19	3	+16
(Japan) 1994	Did not enter							
(Thailand) 1998	(silver) Silver medal	5	3	1	1	26	4	+22
(South Korea) 2002	(gold) Gold medal	5	4	1	0	8	0	+8
(Qatar) 2006	(gold) Gold medal	5	4	1	0	16	2	+14
(China) 2010	(silver) Silver medal	4	2	1	1	5	2	+3
(South Korea) 2014	(gold) Gold medal	5	5	0	0	16	2	+14
(Indonesia) 2018	Quarter-finals	4	2	0	2	25	4	+21
(China) 2022	(silver) Silver medal	4	4	0	1	30	5	+25
(Japan) 2026	(silver) Silver medal	6	4	2	0	28	4	+24
Total	9/10	37	26	8	5	143	21	+122

=== EAFF E-1 Football Championship ===
EAFF E-1 Football Championship (women)
Hosts / Year	Result	M	W	D	L	GF	GA	GD
(South Korea) 2005	Runners-up	3	2	0	1	2	1	+1
(China) 2008	Runners-up	3	1	1	1	6	3	+3
(Japan) 2010	Withdrew							
(South Korea) 2013	Winners	3	2	1	0	3	1	+2
(China) 2015	Winners	3	3	0	0	9	4	+5
(Japan) 2017	Winners	3	3	0	0	5	0	+5
(South Korea) 2019	Withdrew							
(Japan) 2022	Did not enter							
(South Korea) 2025	Withdrew							
Total	5/9	15	11	2	2	25	9	+16

=== Algarve Cup ===
(Portugal) Algarve Cup record
Year	Result	M	W	D	L	GF	GA	GD
2014	8th place	4	3	0	1	6	4	+2
Total	1/27	4	3	0	1	6	4	+2

=== Cyprus Women's Cup ===
Cyprus Women's Cup record
Year	Result	GP	W	D	L	GF	GA	GD
2017	Third place	4	3	0	1	9	2	+7
2018	Third place	4	3	1	0	5	1	+4
2019	Champions	4	3	1	0	12	6	+6
Total	3/13	12	9	2	1	26	9	+17

=== Four Nations Tournament ===
(China) Four Nations Tournament record
Year	Result	GP	W	D	L	GF	GA	GD
2012	Champions	3	2	1	0	2	0	+2
2014	Runners-up	3	2	0	1	3	1	+2
Total	2/18	6	4	1	1	5	1	+4

== See also ==
- Sport in North Korea
  - Football in North Korea
    - Women's football in North Korea
- North Korea women's national under-20 football team
- North Korea women's national under-17 football team
- North Korea national football team
- North Korea–South Korea football rivalry

Sporting positions
Preceded by 1999 China	AFC Women's Champions; 2001 (First title); 2003 (Second title)	Succeeded by 2006 China
Preceded by 2006 China	AFC Women's Champions; 2008 (Third title)	Succeeded by 2010 Australia
