= North Korea women's national football team results =

This article lists the results and fixtures for the North Korea women's national football team. The first international match was held by the North Korean national team on December 21, 1989 against the Chinese Team in the framework of the 1989 AFC Women's Championship, the match was held in Hong Kong ended in a defeat of the North Koreans with a score of 1 goal to 4. Later, within the framework of the same tournament, the national team played two more matches, losing 1 to 3 to the Taiwanese team and defeating the Thai national team with a score of 4 goals to nil, thus taking third place in the group. North Korea has been regularly ranked in the top ten teams worldwide in the FIFA World Rankings.

The team was inactive from March 2019 until 2023 partially due to the COVID-19 pandemic and became unranked due to a lack of FIFA-recognized play. The team resumed play in 2023 and the team's ranking has since been restored. As of the December 2023 FIFA rankings, the team is ranked 9th in the world.

== Record per opponent ==
Key

Positive balance (more wins than losses)
Neutral balance (as many wins as losses)
Negative balance (more losses than wins)

The following table shows North Korea' all-time official international record per opponent:

== Results ==
=== 1989 ===
21 December 1989 AFC Women's Championship	China	4–1	North Korea	Hong Kong
				Stadium: Mong Kok Stadium

23 December 1989 AFC Women's Championship	Chinese Taipei	3–1	North Korea	Hong Kong
				Stadium: Mong Kok Stadium

24 December 1989 AFC Women's Championship	North Korea	4–0	Thailand	Hong Kong
				Stadium: Mong Kok Stadium

=== 1990 ===
27 September 1990 Asian Games	North Korea	7–0	South Korea	Beijing, China

29 September 1990 Asian Games	North Korea	0–0	Chinese Taipei	Beijing, China

1 October 1990 Asian Games	China	2–0	North Korea	Beijing, China

3 October 1990 Asian Games	North Korea	11–0	Hong Kong	Beijing, China

5 October 1990 Asian Games	North Korea	1–1	Japan	Beijing, China

=== 1991 ===
26 May 1991 AFC Women's Championship	Japan	1–0	North Korea	Fukuoka, Japan
	Nagamine 61'

28 May 1991 AFC Women's Championship	North Korea	12–0	Malaysia	Fukuoka, Japan

30 May 1991 AFC Women's Championship	North Korea	10–0	Singapore	Fukuoka, Japan

1 June 1991 AFC Women's Championship	North Korea	5–0	Hong Kong	Fukuoka, Japan

3 June 1991 AFC Women's Championship	China	1–0	North Korea	Fukuoka, Japan

8 June 1991 AFC Women's Championship	Chinese Taipei	0–0 (a.e.t.) (5–4 p)	North Korea	Fukuoka, Japan

=== 1992 ===
31 March 5th Grand Hotel Varna Tournament	North Korea	1–0	Scotland	Varna, Bulgaria
		Report		Stadium: Grand Hotel Varna Stadium

5 April 5th Grand Hotel Varna Tournament	North Korea	3–0	Hungary	Varna, Bulgaria
		Report		Attendance: 600

=== 1993 ===
3 December 1993 AFC Women's Championship	China	1–1	North Korea	Kuching, Malaysia

5 December 1993 AFC Women's Championship	North Korea	12–0	Malaysia	Kuching, Malaysia

8 December 1993 AFC Women's Championship	North Korea	3–0	South Korea	Kuching, Malaysia

10 December 1993 AFC Women's Championship	North Korea	2–0	Chinese Taipei	Kuching, Malaysia

12 December 1993 AFC Women's Championship	North Korea	0–3	China	Kuching, Malaysia

=== 1996 ===
4 June Friendly	China	2–0	North Korea	Shandong, China

8 June Friendly	China	2–0	North Korea	Beijing, China
	Wang Liping; Sun Qingmei

=== 1997 ===
5 December 1997 AFC Women's Championship	China	3–1	North Korea	Guangzhou, China
	Liu Ailing 3', 88'; Fan Yunjie 17'		Kim Kum-sil 83'

7 December 1997 AFC Women's Championship	North Korea	14–1	Philippines	Guangzhou, China

9 December 1997 AFC Women's Championship	North Korea	8–0	Uzbekistan	Guangzhou, China

12 December 1997 AFC Women's Championship	North Korea	1–0	Japan	Guangzhou, China
	Kim Kum-sil 3'

14 December 1997 AFC Women's Championship	China	2–0	North Korea	Guangzhou, China
	Liu Ailing 49', 65'

=== 1998 ===
10 July Friendly	China	3–0	North Korea	Wuxi, China

12 July Friendly	China	0–1	North Korea	Suzhou, China

29 August Friendly	North Korea	0–0	Australia	Pyongyang, North Korea
				Stadium: Kim Il-sung Stadium; Attendance: 58,000

1 September Friendly	North Korea	0–0	Australia	Pyongyang, North Korea
				Stadium: Kim Il-sung Stadium; Attendance: 15,000

3 September Friendly	North Korea	0–1	Australia	Pyongyang, North Korea
			Murray	Stadium: Kim Il-sung Stadium; Attendance: 22,000

5 December 1998 Asian Games	Vietnam	0–7	North Korea	Pathum Thani, Thailand
14:00 UTC+7				Stadium: Thupatemi Stadium

10 December 1998 Asian Games	North Korea	3–2	Japan	Pathum Thani, Thailand
14:00 UTC+7				Stadium: Thupatemi Stadium

12 December 1998 Asian Games	North Korea	15–0	Thailand	Bangkok, Thailand
16:00 UTC+7				Stadium: Thai-Japanese Stadium

15 December 1998 Asian Games	North Korea	1–1 (a.e.t.) (5–4 p)	Chinese Taipei	Pathum Thani, Thailand
15:30 UTC+7				Stadium: Thupatemi Stadium

17 December 1998 Asian Games	China	1–0 (a.e.t.)	North Korea	Pathum Thani, Thailand
	Fan Yunjie 110'			Stadium: Thupatemi Stadium

=== 1999 ===
13 April 1999 Albena Cup	North Korea	3–0	Belarus	Varna, Bulgaria
		Report

14 April 1999 Albena Cup	North Korea	2–0	Ukraine	Varna, Bulgaria
		Report

17 April 1999 Albena Cup	Scotland	1–1	North Korea	Varna, Bulgaria
		Report

18 April 1999 Albena Cup	North Korea	2–1	Ukraine	Varna, Bulgaria
		Report

20 June 1999 FIFA Women's World Cup	North Korea	1–2	Nigeria	Pasadena, United States
18:30 PDT (UTC−7)	Jo Song-ok 74'		Akide 50'; Nwadike 79'	Stadium: Rose Bowl; Attendance: 17,100; Referee: Katriina Elovirta (Finland)

24 June 1999 FIFA Women's World Cup	North Korea	3–1	Denmark	Portland, United States
18:00 PDT (UTC−7)	Jin Pyol-hui 15'; Jo Song-ok 39'; Kim Kum-sil 73'		Johansen 74'	Stadium: Civic Stadium; Attendance: 20,129; Referee: Martha Liliana Pardo (Colombia)

27 June 1999 FIFA Women's World Cup	United States	3–0	North Korea	Foxborough, United States
19:00 EDT (UTC−4)	MacMillan 56'; Venturini 68', 76'			Stadium: Foxborough Stadium; Attendance: 50,484; Referee: Katriina Elovirta (Finland)

7 November 1999 AFC Women's Championship	North Korea	7–0	India	Iloilo City, Philippines

9 November 1999 AFC Women's Championship	North Korea	12–1	Vietnam	Iloilo City, Philippines

11 November 1999 AFC Women's Championship	Malaysia	1–5	North Korea	Iloilo City, Philippines
	Ngah 48'		O Kum-ran 4'; Jin Pyol-hui 8'; Sim Kun-ok 11'; Yang Kyong-hui 21'; Pak Jong-ae 30'

13 November 1999 AFC Women's Championship	Chinese Taipei	1–1	North Korea	Iloilo City, Philippines
	Huang Chung-lan 66' (pen.)		Jin Pyol-hui 38'

19 November 1999 AFC Women's Championship	North Korea	0–3	China	Bacolod, Philippines
			Wang Liping 18'; Liu Ailing 56'; Sun Wen 77'	Stadium: Panaad Stadium

21 November 1999 AFC Women's Championship	North Korea	3–2	Japan	Bacolod, Philippines
	Pak Jong-ae 11'; Jin Pyol-hui 28'; Sim Kum-ok 51'		Otake 52', 69'	Stadium: Panaad Stadium

=== 2000 ===
8 August Friendly	North Korea	2–0	Australia	Pyongyang, North Korea
	Song Ok Jo 4'; Sol Yong Suk 68'	Report		Stadium: Yanggakdo Stadium; Attendance: ~15,000

11 August Friendly	North Korea	2–1	Australia	Pyongyang, North Korea
	Song Ok Jo 68'; Ri Kyong Ae 90+2'	Report	Forman 81'	Stadium: Yanggakdo Stadium; Attendance: ~10,000

=== 2001 ===
2 April 2001 Albena Cup	North Korea	3–0	Belarus	Albena, Bulgaria
		Report

3 April 2001 Albena Cup	North Korea	4–0	Romania	Albena, Bulgaria
		Report

6 April 2001 Albena Cup	North Korea	3–0	Bulgaria	Albena, Bulgaria
		Report

8 April 2001 Albena Cup	Russia	0–0 (5–3 p)	North Korea	Albena, Bulgaria
		Report

4 July Friendly	North Korea	2–0	China	Pyongyang, North Korea

10 July Friendly	North Korea	3–2	China	Pyongyang, North Korea

4 December 2001 AFC Women's Championship	North Korea	19–0	Guam	New Taipei City, Taiwan

6 December 2001 AFC Women's Championship	North Korea	24–0	Singapore	New Taipei City, Taiwan

8 December 2001 AFC Women's Championship	North Korea	4–0	Vietnam	New Taipei City, Taiwan

10 December 2001 AFC Women's Championship	Japan	0–1	North Korea	New Taipei City, Taiwan
			Ri Kum-suk (?)

14 December 2001 AFC Women's Championship	North Korea	3–1	China	New Taipei City, Taiwan
19:30 UTC+8	(?); (?); Jin Pyol-hui 65'		Sun Wen 35'	Stadium: Taipei County Stadium; Attendance: 1,000; Referee: Anna de Toni (Italy)

16 December 2001 AFC Women's Championship	North Korea	2–0	Japan	New Taipei City, Taiwan
16:00 UTC+8	Ri Kum-suk 68'; Ri Un-gyong 75'			Stadium: Yunlin County Stadium; Attendance: 4,000; Referee: Mayumi Oiwa (Japan)

=== 2002 ===
2 April 2002 Albena Cup	North Korea	5–1	Romania	Albena, Bulgaria
		Report

3 April 2002 Albena Cup	Russia	1–2	North Korea	Albena, Bulgaria
		Report

4 April 2002 Albena Cup	North Korea	3–0	Ukraine	Albena, Bulgaria
		Report

5 April 2002 Albena Cup	North Korea	4–0	Bulgaria	Albena, Bulgaria
		Report

9 April 2002 Albena Cup	North Korea	3–0	Russia	Albena, Bulgaria
		Report

15 August Friendly	Denmark	4–0	North Korea	Herlev, Denmark

18 August Friendly	Sweden	1–0	North Korea	Östersund, Sweden
				Stadium: Hofvallen

2 October 2002 Asian Games	Japan	0–1	North Korea	Busan, South Korea
19:23			Jin Pyol-hui 87'	Stadium: Gudeok Stadium

4 October 2002 Asian Games	North Korea	0–0	China	Changwon, South Korea
19:23				Stadium: Changwon Stadium

7 October 2002 Asian Games	Chinese Taipei	0–1	North Korea	Changwon, South Korea
19:23			Ri Hyang-ok 55'	Stadium: Masan Stadium

9 October 2002 Asian Games	North Korea	2–0	South Korea	Busan, South Korea
19:23			Ri Hyang-ok 26'; Jin Pyol-hui 36'	Stadium: Gudeok Stadium

11 October 2002 Asian Games	Vietnam	0–4	North Korea	Changwon, South Korea
15:03			Jin Pyol-hui 17', 43'; Ri Kum-suk 65'; Yun Yong-hui 74'	Stadium: Changwon Stadium

=== 2003 ===
10 June 2003 AFC Women's Championship	North Korea	13–0	Hong Kong	Bangkok, Thailand
	Ra Mi-ae 1'; Ri Kum-suk 4', 24', 33', 37', 75', 84'; Yun Yong-hui 11', 21'; Ri Un-gyong 22', 90+2'; Ho Sun-hui 58'; Jin Pyol-hui 88'	Report		Stadium: Rajamangala Stadium

12 June 2003 AFC Women's Championship	North Korea	14–0	Thailand	Bangkok, Thailand
	Jin Pyol-hui 9', 26', 41', 48'; Ri Un-gyong 20'; Ri Kum-suk 31', 37', 43', 57'; Ra Mi-ae 51'; Yun Yong-hui 64', 83'; Ri Un-suk 75'	Report		Stadium: Rajamangala Stadium

14 June 2003 AFC Women's Championship	North Korea	16–0	Singapore	Bangkok, Thailand
	Jin Pyol-hui 9', 22', 31'; Ho Sun-hui 15', 48'; Ri Kum-suk 17'; Pak Kum-chun 27', 59', 72'; Ri Un-suk 35'; Pak Kyong-sun 41', 60'; Sin Kum-ok 56'; Jang Ok-gyong 57'; Ri Hyang-ok 74'; O Kum-ran 80'	Report		Stadium: Rajamangala Stadium

16 June 2003 AFC Women's Championship	North Korea	2–2	South Korea	Bangkok, Thailand
	Yun Yong-hui 39'; Jin Pyol-hui 77'	Report	Lee Ji-eun 19'; Hwang In-sun 43'	Stadium: Rajamangala Stadium

19 June 2003 AFC Women's Championship	North Korea	3–0	Japan	Bangkok, Thailand
	Ri Kum-suk 7', 35'; Kobayashi 83' (o.g.)			Stadium: Rajamangala Stadium

21 June 2003 AFC Women's Championship	North Korea	2–1 g.g.	China	Bangkok, Thailand
	Ri Kum-suk 41', 112' (pen.)		Gao Hongxia 61'	Stadium: Rajamangala Stadium

25 September 2003 FIFA Women's World Cup	Nigeria	0–3	North Korea	Philadelphia, United States
		Report	Jin Pyol-hui 13', 88'; Ri Un-gyong 73'	Stadium: Lincoln Financial Field; Attendance: 24,347

25 September 2003 FIFA Women's World Cup	Sweden	1–0	North Korea	Philadelphia, United States
16:45 –5	Svensson 7'	Report		Stadium: Lincoln Financial Field; Attendance: 31,553

28 September 2003 FIFA Women's World Cup	North Korea	0–3	United States	Colombus, United States
15:45 –5		Report	Wambach 17' (pen.); Reddick 48', 66'	Stadium: Columbus Crew Stadium; Attendance: 22,828

24 October Friendly	South Korea	0–4	North Korea	Jeju, South Korea

=== 2004 ===
18 February Australia Cup	North Korea	3–0	China	Brisbane, Australia
	unknown 44' (o.g.); Jin Pyol-hui 53'; Yun Yong Hui 56'			Stadium: QE II Stadium

22 February Australia Cup	Australia	Abandoned (Note: match abandoned at half time due to adverse weather, with a declaration of a 0–0 result (although North Korea were leading 0–1).)	North Korea	Brisbane, Australia
		Report		Stadium: QE II Stadium

24 February Australia Cup	North Korea	11–0	New Zealand	Brisbane, Australia
				Stadium: QE II Stadium

18 April 2004 Summer Olympics qualification	North Korea	5–0	Chinese Taipei	Hiroshima, Japan
	Ri Kum-suk 11', 69'; Ri Hyang-ok 19'; Yun Yong-hui 36'; Jin Pyol-hui 84'	Japan Football Association		Stadium: Hiroshima Big Arch

20 April 2004 Summer Olympics qualification	Hong Kong	0–9	North Korea	Hiroshima, Japan
		Japan Football Association	Ra Mi-ae 6'; Ho Sun-hui 7', 69'; Jin Pyol-hui 8'; Ri Kum-suk 50', 52', 90'; Ri Hyang-ok 62'; Pak Kyong-sun 80'	Stadium: Hiroshima Big Arch

22 April 2004 Summer Olympics qualification	North Korea	8–0	Singapore	Hiroshima, Japan
	Jin Pyol-hui 6'; Seok Cheon-myong 12'; Ri Kum-suk 16', 23'; O Kum-ran 42'; Pak Kyong-sun 45'; Ri Un-gyong 49', 73'	Japan Football Association		Stadium: Hiroshima Big Arch

24 April 2004 Summer Olympics qualification	North Korea	0–3	Japan	Tokyo, Japan
		Japan Football Association	Arakawa 11'; 45+1' (o.g.); Otani 64'	Stadium: National Stadium, Tokyo

26 April 2004 Summer Olympics qualification	North Korea	5–1	South Korea	Hiroshima, Japan
	Seok Cheon-myung 2'; Ri Kum-suk 32'; Ri Hyang-ok 40', 71'; O Kum-ran 88'	Japan Football Association	Park Eun-sun 39'	Stadium: Hiroshima Big Arch

=== 2005 ===
9 April 2005 Albena Cup	Bulgaria	0–5	North Korea	Varna, Bulgaria

1 August 2005 EAFF Women's Football Championship	North Korea	1–0	Japan	Jeonju, South Korea
	Ri Un-suk 38'	Report		Stadium: Jeonju World Cup Stadium; Attendance: 3,500

3 August 2005 EAFF Women's Football Championship	South Korea	1–0	North Korea	Jeonju, South Korea
	Park Eun-jung 77'	Report		Stadium: Jeonju World Cup Stadium; Attendance: 12,000

5 August 2005 EAFF Women's Football Championship	China	0–1	North Korea	Daegu, South Korea
		Report	Jo Yun-mi 58'	Stadium: Daegu World Cup Stadium; Attendance: 500

16 August Friendly	South Korea	0–2	North Korea	Paju, South Korea
				Stadium: Paju Public Stadium

=== 2006 ===
27 May Friendly	China	1–1	North Korea	Xianghe, China
		Report		Stadium: Xianghe Football Base

30 May Friendly	China	1–1	North Korea	Tianjin, China
19:30 UTC+8		Report		Stadium: TEDA Football Stadium

18 July 2006 AFC Women's Asian Cup	Thailand	0–9	North Korea	Adelaide, Australia
12:00 UTC+9:30		Report	Ri Kum-suk 8', 34'; Ri Un-suk 31'; Kim Than-sil 36', 73'; Ho Sun-hui 43'; Jo Yun-mi 59'; Kim Yong-ae 67', 87'	Stadium: Hindmarsh Stadium; Attendance: 200; Referee: Mayumi Oiwa (Japan)

20 July 2006 AFC Women's Asian Cup	North Korea	3–0	Myanmar	Adelaide, Australia
12:00 UTC+9:30	Ri Un-suk 23', 37'; Ri Un-gyong 85'			Stadium: Hindmarsh Stadium; Attendance: 150; Referee: Bentla D'Coth (India)

22 July 2006 AFC Women's Asian Cup	Australia	0–0	North Korea	Adelaide, Australia
19:00 UTC+9:30				Stadium: Hindmarsh Stadium; Attendance: 4,000; Referee: Mayumi Oiwa (Japan)

24 July 2006 AFC Women's Asian Cup	North Korea	1–0	South Korea	Adelaide, Australia
14:30 UTC+9:30	Kim Yong-ae 76'			Stadium: Hindmarsh Stadium; Attendance: 300; Referee: Pannipar Kamnueng (Thailand)

27 July 2006 AFC Women's Asian Cup	China	1–0	North Korea	Adelaide, Australia
19:30 UTC+9:30	Ma Xiaoxu 58'			Stadium: Hindmarsh Stadium; Attendance: 1,000; Referee: Anna De Toni (Italy)

30 July 2006 AFC Women's Asian Cup	Japan	2–3	North Korea	Adelaide, Australia
12:30 UTC+9:30	Ando 43'; Nagasato 89'		Ri Un-suk 23'; Ri Un-gyong 33', 39'	Stadium: Hindmarsh Stadium; Attendance: 1,200; Referee: Tammy Ogston (Australia)

30 November 2006 Asian Games	North Korea	5–0	Vietnam	Doha, Qatar
19:45 UTC+3	Kil Son-hui 5', 45'; Ri Un-gyong 17'; Kim Kyong-hwa 22'; Ri Kum-suk 27'	RSSSF		Stadium: Qatar SC Stadium; Attendance: 500; Referee: Niu Huijun (China)

4 December 2006 Asian Games	Chinese Taipei	0–4	North Korea	Al Rayyan, Qatar
19:45 UTC+3		RSSSF	Kim Kyong-hwa 6', 53'; Ri Un-suk 49'; Ho Sun-hui 55'	Stadium: Al-Rayyan Stadium; Attendance: 450; Referee: Pannipar Kamnueng (Thailand)

7 December 2006 Asian Games	North Korea	4–1	South Korea	Al Rayyan, Qatar
19:45 UTC+3	Ri Kum-suk 10', 17'; Kim Kyong-hwa 12'; Ri Un-gyong 70'	RSSSF	Park Hee-young 25'	Stadium: Al-Rayyan Stadium; Attendance: 1,198; Referee: Bentla D'Coth (India)

10 December 2006 Asian Games	North Korea	3–1 (a.e.t.)	China	Doha, Qatar
19:00 UTC+3	Kil Son-hui 21'; Ri Kum-suk 94'; Ri Un-gyong 99'	Report	Wang Dandan 10'	Stadium: Qatar SC Stadium; Attendance: 3,024; Referee: Bentla D'Coth (India)

13 December 2006 Asian Games	Japan	0–0 (a.e.t.) (2–4 p)	North Korea	Doha, Qatar
19:00 UTC+3				Stadium: Qatar SC Stadium; Attendance: 4,830; Referee: Niu Huijun (China)
	Penalties
	Sawa (penalty missed); Ando (penalty missed); Nagasato (penalty scored); Nakaoka (penalty scored)		(penalty scored) Ri Kum-suk; (penalty scored) Ri Un-gyong; (penalty scored) Ho Sun-hui; (penalty scored) Jong Pok-sim

=== 2007 ===
7 April 2008 Summer Olympics qualification	North Korea	8–0	Chinese Taipei	Pyongyang, North Korea
16:00		Report		Stadium: Kim Il-sung

15 April 2008 Summer Olympics qualification	Hong Kong	0–14	North Korea	Siu Sai Wan, Hong Kong
15:00		Report		Stadium: Siu Sai Wan Sports Ground

3 June 2008 Summer Olympic qualification	North Korea	2–0	Australia	Pyongyang, North Korea
	Ri Kum-suk 35', 55' (pen.)	Report		Stadium: Yanggakdo Stadium; Attendance: 3,100; Referee: Huijin Niu (China)

10 June 2008 Summer Olympic qualification	Australia	0–2	North Korea	Coffs Harbour, Australia
		Report	Ri Kum-suk 60'; Kim Kyong-hwa 69'	Stadium: Coffs Harbour International Stadium; Attendance: 2,121; Referee: Sachiko Baba (Japan)

29 July Friendly	Netherlands	0–0	North Korea	Volendam, Netherlands
				Stadium: Kras Stadion

4 August 2008 Summer Olympics qualification	Chinese Taipei	0–6	North Korea	Taipei, Taiwan
18:00		Report		Stadium: Zhongshan Stadium

12 August 2008 Summer Olympics qualification	North Korea	19–0	Hong Kong	Pyongyang, North Korea
17:00		Report		Stadium: Kim Il-sung Stadium

11 September 2007 FIFA Women's World Cup	United States	2–2	North Korea	Chengdu, China
18:00 UTC+8	Wambach 50'; O'Reilly 69'	Report	Kil Son-hui 58'; Kim Yong-ae 62'	Stadium: Chendu Sports Centre Stadium; Attendance: 35,100

14 September 2007 FIFA Women's World Cup	North Korea	2–0	Nigeria	Chengdu, China
20:00 UTC+8	Kim Kyong-hwa 17'; Ri Kum-suk 21'	Report		Stadium: Chengdu Sports Centre Stadium; Attendance: 35,600; Referee: Tammy Ogston (Australia)

18 September 2007 FIFA Women's World Cup	North Korea	1–2	Sweden	Tianjin, China
20:00 UTC+8	Ri Un-suk 22'	Report	Schelin 4', 54'	Stadium: Tianjin Olympic Center Stadium; Attendance: 33,196; Referee: Christine Beck (Germany)

22 September 2007 FIFA Women's World Cup	Germany	3–0	North Korea	Wuhan, China
17:00 UTC+8	Garefrekes 44'; Lingor 67'; Krahn 72'	Report		Stadium: Wuhan Sports Centre Stadium; Attendance: 37,200; Referee: Tammy Ogston (Australia)

=== 2008 ===
18 February 2008 EAFF Women's Football Championship	North Korea	2–3	Japan	Chongqing, China
17:00 UTC+8	Ri Kum-suk 37'; Ri Un-gyong 54'	Report	Ando 3'; Miyama 81'; Sawa 90+3'	Stadium: Yongchuan Stadium; Referee: Cha Sung-mi (Korea Republic)

21 February 2008 EAFF Women's Football Championship	China	0–0	North Korea	Chongqing, China
19:30 UTC+8		Report		Stadium: Yongchuan Stadium; Attendance: 23,000; Referee: Cha Sung-mi (Korea Republic)

23 February 2008 EAFF Women's Football Championship	South Korea	0–4	North Korea	Chongqing, China
17:00 UTC+8		Report	Kim Yong-ae 53', 78'; Hong Myong-gum 68'; Ri Kum-suk 69'	Stadium: Yongchuan Stadium; Attendance: 25,000; Referee: Baba Sachiko (Japan)

28 May 2008 AFC Women's Asian Cup	North Korea	5–0	Thailand	Hồ Chí Minh City, Vietnam
17:00 UTC+7	Kim Kyong-hwa 8', 39'; Ri Kum-suk 30'; Ri Un-suk 51'; Kim Yong-ae 90+1'	Report (AFC); Report		Stadium: Thống Nhất Stadium; Attendance: 2,000; Referee: Tammy Ogston (Australia)

30 May 2008 AFC Women's Asian Cup	Vietnam	0–3	North Korea	Hồ Chí Minh City, Vietnam
17:00		Report (AFC); Report	Ri Un-gyong 11' (pen.); Ri Kum-suk 39', 67'	Stadium: Thống Nhất Stadium; Attendance: 1,700; Referee: Hong Eun-Ah (Korea Republic)

1 June 2008 AFC Women's Asian Cup	China	0–1	North Korea	Hồ Chí Minh City, Vietnam
18:30		Report (AFC); Report	Ri Un-gyong 34'	Stadium: Army Stadium, Ho Chi Minh City; Attendance: 200; Referee: Tammy Ogston (Australia)

5 June 2008 AFC Women's Asian Cup	North Korea	3–0	Australia	Hồ Chí Minh City, Vietnam
	Ri Kum-Suk 2', 41', 60'	Report (AFC); Report		Stadium: Thống Nhất Stadium; Attendance: 2,700; Referee: Pannipar Kamnueng (Thailand)

8 June 2008 AFC Women's Asian Cup	North Korea	2–1	China	Hồ Chí Minh City, Vietnam
19:00	Ri Kum-suk 55'; Ri Yong-ae 68'	Report (AFC); Report	Bi Yan 12'	Stadium: Thống Nhất Stadium; Attendance: 2,500; Referee: Sachiko Baba (Japan)

6 August 2008 Summer Olympics	North Korea	1–0	Nigeria	Shenyang, China
19:45 UTC+8	Kim Kyong-hwa 27'	Report		Stadium: Shenyang Olympic Stadium; Attendance: 24,084; Referee: Shane de Silva (Trinidad and Tobago)

9 August 2008 Summer Olympics	Brazil	2–1	North Korea	Shenyang, China
19:45 UTC+8	Daniela 14'; Marta 23'	Report	Ri Kum-suk 90'	Stadium: Shenyang Olympic Stadium; Attendance: 19,616; Referee: Niu Huijun (China)

12 August 2008 Summer Olympics	North Korea	0–1	Germany	Tianjin, China
17:00 UTC+8		Report	Mittag 86'	Stadium: Tianjin Olympic Center Stadium; Attendance: 12,387; Referee: Dianne Ferreira-James (Guyana)

=== 2009 ===
27 December Friendly	China	1–1	North Korea	Nanjing, China
16:00 UTC+8		Report		Stadium: Jiangning Sports Center

29 December Friendly	China	2–2	North Korea	Nanjing, China
10:00 UTC+8		Report		Stadium: Jiangning Sports Center

=== 2010 ===
17 February 2010 Friendly	Germany	3–0	North Korea	Duisburg, Germany
--:-- UTC+1

3 March 2010 Friendly	Australia	2–2	North Korea	Brisbane, Australia
--:-- UTC+10

6 March 2010 Friendly	Australia	3–2	North Korea	Brisbane, Australia
--:-- UTC+10

2 May 2010 Friendly	North Korea	1–0	Nigeria	Pyongyang, North Korea
--:-- UTC+9

4 May 2010 Friendly	North Korea	3–0	Nigeria	Pyongyang, North Korea
--:-- UTC+9

20 May 2010 2010 AFC Women's Asian Cup GS	North Korea	3–0	Thailand	Chengdu, China
16:00 UTC+8	Jon Myong-hwa 1'; Kim Yong-ae 2'; Jo Yun-mi 73'	Report		Stadium: Chengdu Sports Centre; Attendance: 260; Referee: Bentla D'Coth (India)

22 May 2010 2010 AFC Women's Asian Cup GS	Myanmar	0–2	North Korea	Chengdu, China
19:30 UTC+8		Report	Yun Song-mi 17'; Jo Yun-mi 84'	Stadium: Chengdu Sports Centre; Attendance: 260; Referee: Wang Jia (China)

24 May 2010 2010 AFC Women's Asian Cup GS	North Korea	1–2	Japan	Chengdu, China
16:00 UTC+8	Ra Un-sim 70'	Report	Ando 4' (pen.); Nagasato 14'	Stadium: Chengdu Sports Centre; Attendance: 400; Referee: Hong Eun-ah (South Korea)

27 May 2010 2010 AFC Women's Asian Cup SF	China	0–1 (a.e.t.)	North Korea	Chengdu, China
19:30 UTC+8		Report	Kim Kyong-hwa 109'	Stadium: Chengdu Sports Centre; Attendance: 12,500; Referee: Semaksuk Praew (Thailand)

30 May 2010 2010 AFC Women's Asian Cup Final	Australia	1–1 (a.e.t.) (5–4 p)	North Korea	Chengdu, China
19:30 UTC+8	Kerr 19'	Report	Jo Yun-mi 73'	Stadium: Chengdu Sports Centre; Attendance: 1,200; Referee: Sachiko Yamagichi (Japan)
	Penalties
	Shipard (penalty scored); Ledbrook (penalty scored); Gill (penalty scored); Garriock (penalty scored); Simon (penalty scored)		(penalty scored) Jo Yun-mi; (penalty missed) Yun Song-mi; (penalty scored) Choe Yong-sim; (penalty scored) Yu Jong-hui; (penalty scored) Mun Chol-mi

16 November 2010 2010 Asian Games GS	Thailand	0–2	North Korea	Guangzhou, China
19:00 UTC+8			Jong Pok-sim 34' (pen.); Ra Un-sim 58'	Stadium: Huangpu Sports Center Stadium; Attendance: 2,580; Referee: Mai Hoàng Trang (Vietnam)

18 November 2010 2010 Asian Games GS	Japan	0–0	North Korea	Guangzhou, China
16:00 UTC+8				Stadium: University Town Stadium; Attendance: 26,000; Referee: Wang Jia (China)

20 November 2010 2010 Asian Games SF	South Korea	1–3 (a.e.t.)	North Korea	Guangzhou, China
19:00 UTC+8	Yoo Young-a 88'		Jo Yun-mi 45+1'; Ra Un-sim 94', 119'	Stadium: Tianhe Stadium; Attendance: 36,700; Referee: Jacqui Melksham (Australia)

22 November 2010 2010 Asian Games Final	North Korea	0–1	Japan	Guangzhou, China
19:00 UTC+8			Iwashimizu 73'	Stadium: Tianhe Stadium; Attendance: 23,300; Referee: Pannipar Kamnueng (Thailand)

=== 2011 ===
17 April 2011 Friendly	China	0–1	North Korea	Qingdao, China
15:00 UTC+8				Stadium: Qingdao Tiantai Stadium

19 April 2011 Friendly	China	2–0	North Korea	Qingdao, China
15:00 UTC+8				Stadium: Qingdao Tiantai Stadium

18 May 2011 Friendly	Netherlands	1–1	North Korea	Venlo, Netherlands
--:-- UTC+2

21 May 2011 Friendly	Germany	2–0	North Korea	Ingolstadt, Germany
--:-- UTC+2

24 May 2011 Friendly	Belgium	1–0	North Korea	Lanaken, Belgium
--:-- UTC+2

14 June 2011 Friendly	Canada	2–0	North Korea	Rome, Italy
--:-- UTC+2

21 June 2011 Friendly	North Korea	3–0	England	Halle, Germany
--:-- UTC+2

28 June 2011 2011 FIFA Women's World Cup GS	United States	2–0	North Korea	Dresden, Germany
18:15 UTC+1	Holiday 54'; Buehler 76'	Report		Stadium: Rudolf-Harbig-Stadion; Attendance: 21,859; Referee: Bibiana Steinhaus (Germany)

2 July 2011 2011 FIFA Women's World Cup GS	North Korea	0–1	Sweden	Augsburg, Germany
14:00 UTC+1		Report	Dahlkvist 64'	Stadium: Impuls Arena; Attendance: 23,768; Referee: Estela Álvarez (Argentina)

6 July 2011 2011 FIFA Women's World Cup GS	North Korea	0–0	Colombia	Bochum, Germany
20:45 UTC+1		Report		Stadium: Ruhrstadion; Attendance: 7,805; Referee: Christina Pedersen (Norway)

1 September 2011 2012 Summer Olympics qualification	North Korea	1–0	Australia	Jinan, China
15:30 UTC+8	Kim Su-gyong 10'	Report		Stadium: Jinan Olympic Sports Center; Attendance: 800; Referee: Alexandros Dimitropoulos (Greece)

3 September 2011 2012 Summer Olympics qualification	China	0–0	North Korea	Jinan, China
19:00 UTC+8		Report		Stadium: Shandong Provincial Stadium; Attendance: 10,000; Referee: Kateryna Monzul (Ukraine)

5 September 2011 2012 Summer Olympics qualification	South Korea	2–3	North Korea	Jinan, China
15:30 UTC+8	Lee Hyun-young 5'; Jo Yun-mi 62' (o.g.)	Report	Ra Un-sim 9'; Choe Mi-gyong 28'; Hwang Song-mi 57'	Stadium: Jinan Olympic Sports Center; Attendance: 417; Referee: Teodora Albon (Romania)

8 September 2011 2012 Summer Olympics qualification	North Korea	1–1	Japan	Jinan, China
15:30 UTC+8	Kim Jo-ran 90+2'	Report	Kim Nam-hui 83' (o.g.)	Stadium: Shandong Provincial Stadium; Attendance: 1,274; Referee: Christina W. Pedersen (Norway)

11 September 2011 2012 Summer Olympics qualification	Thailand	0–5	North Korea	Jinan, China
15:30 UTC+8		Report	Choe Mi-gyong 30'; Yun Song-mi 35'; Ra Un-sim 50', 70'; Kim Un-hwa 56'	Stadium: Jinan Olympic Sports Center; Attendance: 555; Referee: Mai Hoàng Trang (Vietnam)

=== 2012 ===
15 February 2012 2012 Four Nations Tournament	South Korea	0–1	North Korea	Yongchuan, China
18:00 UTC+8				Stadium: Yongchuan Sports Center

17 February 2012 2012 Four Nations Tournament	Mexico	0–1	North Korea	Yongchuan, China
18:00 UTC+8				Stadium: Yongchuan Sports Center

19 February 2012 2012 Four Nations Tournament	China	0–0	North Korea	Yongchuan, China
18:00 UTC+8				Stadium: Yongchuan Sports Center

29 May 2012 Friendly	Slovakia	1–3	North Korea	Senec, Slovakia
16:00 UTC+2		Report		Stadium: NTC Senec

1 June 2012 Friendly	Netherlands	4–1	North Korea	Wijchen , Netherlands
--:-- UTC+2

2 June 2012 Friendly	Belgium	1–2	North Korea	Gelderland, Netherlands
15:00 UTC+2		Report		Stadium: Sportpark de Pauw

5 June 2012 Friendly	Netherlands	2–0	North Korea	Hoenderloo, Netherlands
14:00 UTC+2		Report

9 June 2012 Friendly	Belgium	2–2	North Korea	Koksijde, Belgium
17:00 UTC+2		Report		Stadium: Henri Houtsaegerstadion

12 June 2012 Friendly	Romania	2–4	North Korea	Mogoșoaia, Romania
16:00 UTC+2		Report		Stadium: Stadionul CNAF

14 June 2012 Friendly	Romania	1–5	North Korea	Mogoșoaia, Romania
14:00 UTC+2		Report		Stadium: Centrul National De Fotbal Buftea

19 July 2012 Friendly	Wales	2–4	North Korea	Llanelli, Wales
18:00 UTC+1		Report		Stadium: Stebonheath Park

25 July 2012 2012 Summer Olympics GS	Colombia	0–2	North Korea	Glasgow, Scotland
20:50 UTC+1		Report	Kim Song-hui 39', 85'	Stadium: Hampden Park; Attendance: 18,900; Referee: Carol Anne Chenard (Canada)

25 July 2012 2012 Summer Olympics GS	France	5–0	North Korea	Glasgow, Scotland
19:45 UTC+1	Georges 45'; Thomis 70'; Delie 71'; Renard 81'; Catala 87'	Report		Stadium: Hampden Park; Attendance: 11,743; Referee: Thérèse Neguel (Cameroon)

31 July 2012 2012 Summer Olympics GS	United States	1–0	North Korea	Glasgow, Scotland
17:15 UTC+1	Wambach 25'	Report		Stadium: Hampden Park; Attendance: 29,522; Referee: Jenny Palmqvist (Sweden)

=== 2013 ===
21 July 2013 2013 EAFF Women's East Asian Cup	South Korea	1–2	North Korea	Seoul, South Korea
18:15 UTC+9	Kim Soo-yun 26'	Report	Ho Un-byol 36', 38'	Stadium: Seoul World Cup Stadium; Attendance: 6,530; Referee: Pannipar Kamnueng (Thailand)

25 July 2013 2013 EAFF Women's East Asian Cup	Japan	0–0	North Korea	Hwaseong, South Korea
17:15 UTC+9		Report		Stadium: Hwaseong Stadium; Attendance: 1,013; Referee: Li Juan (China PR)

27 July 2013 2013 EAFF Women's East Asian Cup	North Korea	1–0	China	Seoul, South Korea
17:15 UTC+9	Ri Un-hyang 2'	Report		Stadium: Jamsil Olympic Stadium; Attendance: 935; Referee: Mai Hoàng Trang (Vietnam)

=== 2014 ===
11 February 2014 2014 Four Nations Tournament	North Korea	2–0	Mexico	Yongchuan, China

13 February 2014 2014 Four Nations Tournament	North Korea	1–0	New Zealand	Yongchuan, China

15 February 2014 2014 Four Nations Tournament	China	1–0	North Korea	Yongchuan, China

5 March 2014 2014 Algarve Cup GS	Russia	1–2	North Korea	Lagos, Portugal
16:00 UTC+1	Morozova 90+2'	Report	Jong Yu-ri 33'; Ra Un-sim 90'	Stadium: Estádio Municipal; Referee: Therese Neguel (Cameroon)

7 March 2014 2014 Algarve Cup GS	Austria	0–2	North Korea	Lagos, Portugal
18:00 UTC+1		Report	Kim Un-ju 57'; Ho Un-byol 72'	Stadium: Estádio Municipal; Referee: Wang Jia (China)

10 March 2014 2014 Algarve Cup GS	Portugal	0–2	North Korea	Faro, Portugal
18:30 UTC+1		Report	Ho Un-byol 39'; Ra Un-sim 54'	Stadium: Estádio Algarve; Referee: Sheena Dickson (Canada)

12 March 2014 2014 Algarve Cup 7th place	North Korea	0–3	United States	Parchal, Portugal
11:00 UTC+1		Report	Wambach 11', 58'; O'Reilly 88'	Stadium: Estádio Municipal Bela Vista; Attendance: 250; Referee: Stéphanie Frappart (France)

16 September 2014 2014 Asian Games GS	North Korea	5–0	Vietnam	Incheon, South Korea
17:00 UTC+9	Kim Yun-mi 5', 10'; Kim Un-ju 21' (pen.); Ri Ye-gyong 41'; Jong Yu-ri 84' (pen.)	Report		Stadium: Namdong Asiad Rugby Field; Referee: Li Juan (China)

20 September 2014 2014 Asian Games GS	Hong Kong	0–5	North Korea	Incheon, South Korea
17:00 UTC+9		Report	Wi Jong-sim 8'; Ri Ye-gyong 57', 64'; Ho Un-byol 67'; Ra Un-sim 83'	Stadium: Namdong Asiad Rugby Field; Referee: Kate Jacewicz (Australia)

26 September 2014 2014 Asian Games QF	North Korea	1–0	China	Ansan, South Korea
16:00 UTC+9	Ho Un-byol 73'	Report		Stadium: Wa~ Stadium; Referee: Nami Imaizumi (Japan)

29 September 2014 2014 Asian Games SF	South Korea	1–2	North Korea	Incheon, South Korea
20:00 UTC+9	Jung Seol-bin 12'	Report	Ri Ye-gyong 36'; Ho Un-byol 90+3'	Stadium: Munhak Stadium; Referee: Wang Jia (China)

1 October 2014 2014 Asian Games Final	North Korea	3–1	Japan	Incheon, South Korea
20:00 UTC+9	Kim Yun-mi 12'; Ra Un-sim 52'; Ho Un-byol 87'	Report	Miyama 56'	Stadium: Munhak Stadium; Referee: Kate Jacewicz (Australia)

=== 2015 ===
8 February 2015 Three Nations Tournament	New Zealand	1–1	North Korea	Auckland, New Zealand

10 February 2015 Three Nations Tournament	Australia	2–1	North Korea	Auckland, New Zealand

1 August 2015 2015 EAFF East Asian Cup	North Korea	4–2	Japan	Wuhan, China
18:20 UTC+8	Ri Ye-gyong 36', 66'; Ra Un-sim 79', 81'	Report	Masuya 49'; Sugita 70'	Stadium: Wuhan Sports Center Stadium; Referee: Casey Reibelt (Australia)

4 August 2015 2015 EAFF East Asian Cup	China	2–3	North Korea	Wuhan, China
21:00 UTC+8	Li Dongna 32' (pen.); Wang Shanshan 52'	Report	Kim Yun-mi 5'; Wi Jong-sim 24', 69'	Stadium: Wuhan Sports Center Stadium; Referee: Mai Hoàng Trang (Vietnam)

8 August 2015 2015 EAFF East Asian Cup	South Korea	0–2	North Korea	Wuhan, China
17:10 UTC+8		Report	Yun Song-mi 22'; Ra Un-sim 52'	Stadium: Wuhan Sports Center Stadium; Referee: Casey Reibelt (Australia)

=== 2016 ===
29 February 2016 2016 AFC Olympic Qualification Final round	North Korea	1–1	South Korea	Osaka, Japan
19:35 UTC+9	Kim Un-ju 80'	Report	Jung Seol-bin 32'	Stadium: Yanmar Stadium Nagai; Attendance: 2,000; Referee: Stéphanie Frappart (France)

2 March 2016 2016 AFC Olympic Qualification Final round	North Korea	1–1	China	Osaka, Japan
19:35 UTC+9	Ra Un-sim 38'	Report	Wang Shuang 90+3' (pen.)	Stadium: Yanmar Stadium Nagai; Attendance: 463; Referee: Rita Gani (Malaysia)

4 March 2016 2016 AFC Olympic Qualification Final round	Vietnam	0–1	North Korea	Osaka, Japan
16:35 UTC+9		Report	Ju Hyo-sim 90'	Stadium: Yanmar Stadium Nagai; Attendance: 996; Referee: Abirami Apbai Naidu (Singapore)

7 March 2016 2016 AFC Olympic Qualification Final round	North Korea	1–2	Australia	Osaka, Japan
19:35 UTC+9	Kim Su-gyong 78'	Report	Heyman 18'; Gorry 84'	Stadium: Yanmar Stadium Nagai; Attendance: 900; Referee: Anna-Marie Keighley (New Zealand)

9 March 2016 2016 AFC Olympic Qualification Final round	Japan	1–0	North Korea	Osaka, Japan
19:35 UTC+9	Iwabuchi 80'	Report		Stadium: Kincho Stadium; Attendance: 4,766; Referee: Esther Staubli (Switzerland)

=== 2017 ===
1 March 2017 2017 Cyprus Women's Cup Group A	North Korea	3–0	Italy	Larnaca, Cyprus
14:30 UTC+3	Kim Yun-mi 3'; Ri Kyong-hyang 48'; Ho Un-byol 50'	Report		Stadium: GSZ Stadium

3 March 2017 2017 Cyprus Women's Cup Group A	Switzerland	1–0	North Korea	Larnaca, Cyprus
14:30 UTC+3	Kiwic 88'	Report		Stadium: Ammochostos Stadium

6 March 2017 2017 Cyprus Women's Cup Group A	North Korea	4–1	Belgium	Larnaca, Cyprus
14:30 UTC+3	Kim Nam-hui 7'; Ho Un-byol 30'; Wi Jong-sim 57'; Ri Kyong-hyang 71'	Report		Stadium: GSZ Stadium; Referee: Marte Sørø (Norway)

8 March 2017 2017 Cyprus Women's Cup 3rd place	North Korea	2–0	Republic of Ireland	Larnaca, Cyprus
14:30 UTC+3	Wi Jong-sim 73'; Kim Ryu-song 85'	Report		Stadium: AEK Arena

3 April 2017 2018 AFC Women's Asian Cup qualification Group B	North Korea	8–0	India	Pyongyang, North Korea
15:00 UTC+9	Ri Un-yong 7'; Ri Kyong-hyang 13'; Ri Hyang-sim 21'; Kim Phyong-hwa 45+1', 78'; Wi Jong-sim 48', 64' (pen.); Sung Hyang-sim 80'	Report		Stadium: Kim Il-sung Stadium; Attendance: 15,000; Referee: Bui Thi Thu Trang (Vietnam)

5 April 2017 2018 AFC Women's Asian Cup qualification Group B	North Korea	5–0	Hong Kong	Pyongyang, North Korea
15:00 UTC+9	Ri Un-yong 12'; Kim Yun-mi 28', 39'; Ho Wan Tung 45+1' (o.g.); Choe Un-ju 77'	Report		Stadium: Kim Il-sung Stadium; Attendance: 13,500; Referee: Aye Thein (Myanmar)

5 April 2017 2018 AFC Women's Asian Cup qualification Group B	South Korea	1–1	North Korea	Pyongyang, North Korea
15:00 UTC+9	Jang Sel-gi 76'	Report	Sung Hyang-sim 45+3'	Stadium: Kim Il-sung Stadium; Attendance: 42,500; Referee: Casey Reibelt (Australia)

9 April 2017 2018 AFC Women's Asian Cup qualification Group B	Uzbekistan	0–4	North Korea	Pyongyang, North Korea
16:00 UTC+9		Report	Kim Yun-mi 28', 90+2'; Sung Hyang-sim 54', 65'	Stadium: Kim Il-sung Stadium; Attendance: 40,400; Referee: Bui Thi Thu Trang (Vietnam)

8 June 2017 Friendly	China	0–1	North Korea	Duyun, China
			Sung Hyang-sim 37'

19 October 2017 2017 Four Nations Tournament	China	1–2	North Korea	Yongchuan, China

21 October 2017 2017 Four Nations Tournament	Brazil	2–0	North Korea	Yongchuan, China

21 October 2017 2017 Four Nations Tournament	North Korea	1–0	Mexico	Yongchuan, China

8 December 2017 2017 EAFF E-1 Championship Final tournament	China	0–2	North Korea	Chiba, Japan
16:10 UTC+9		Report	Kim Yun-mi 24', 78'	Stadium: Fukuda Denshi Arena; Attendance: 1,201; Referee: Thein Thein Aye (Myanmar)

11 December 2017 2017 EAFF E-1 Championship Final tournament	North Korea	1–0	South Korea	Chiba, Japan
16:10 UTC+9	Kim Yun-mi 18'	Report		Stadium: Fukuda Denshi Arena; Attendance: 1,514; Referee: Mahsa Ghorbani (Iran)

15 December 2017 2017 EAFF E-1 Championship Final tournament	Japan	0–2	North Korea	Chiba, Japan
18:55 UTC+9		Report	Kim Yun-mi 65'; Ri Hyang-sim 82'	Stadium: Fukuda Denshi Arena; Attendance: 5,227; Referee: Kate Jacewicz (Australia)

=== 2018 ===
28 February 2018 2018 Cyprus Women's Cup Group C	Hungary	0–2	North Korea	Paralimni, Cyprus
18:00 UTC+3		Report	Kim Yun-mi 56', 89'	Stadium: Tasos Markos Stadium

2 March 2018 2018 Cyprus Women's Cup Group C	North Korea	1–0	Slovakia	Paralimni, Cyprus
13:00 UTC+3	Kim Phyong-hwa 60'	Report		Stadium: Tasos Markos Stadium

5 March 2018 2018 Cyprus Women's Cup Group C	South Africa	0–0	North Korea	Paralimni, Cyprus
13:00 UTC+3		Report		Stadium: Tasos Markos Stadium

7 March 2018 2018 Cyprus Women's Cup 3rd place	North Korea	2–1	Switzerland	Paralimni, Cyprus
14:00 UTC+3	Yu Jong-hui 22'; Kim Yun-mi 90+1'	Report	Rinast 90+3'	Stadium: Tasos Markos Stadium

17 August 2018 2018 Asian Games Group B	North Korea	16–0	Tajikistan	Palembang, Indonesia
18:30 UTC+7	Sung Hyang-sim 2', 6', 24', 42'; Kim Yun-mi 10', 19', 50'; Rim Se-ok 31', 55', 66'; Yu Jong-im 43'; Kim Phyong-hwa 46'; Kim Nam-hui 62'; Kim Un-hwa 77', 82'; Ri Hae-yon 79'	Report		Stadium: Bumi Sriwijaya Stadium; Referee: Pansa Chaisanit (Thailand)

20 August 2018 2018 Asian Games Group B	Hong Kong	0–8	North Korea	Palembang, Indonesia
18:30 UTC+7		Report	Ri Un-yong 19'; Yu Jong-im 22', 45+2'; Kim Yun-mi 36'; Pak Hye-gyong 55'; Kim Un-hwa 59'; Ri Hae-yon 78'; Fung 82' (o.g.)	Stadium: Bumi Sriwijaya Stadium; Referee: Anna Sidorova (Uzbekistan)

22 August 2018 2018 Asian Games Group B	North Korea	0–2	China	Palembang, Indonesia
18:30 UTC+7		Report	Wang Shuang 8'; Wang Shanshan 50'	Stadium: Gelora Sriwijaya Stadium; Referee: Rebecca Durcau (Australia)

25 August 2018 2018 Asian Games QF	Japan	2–1	North Korea	Palembang, Indonesia
16:00 UTC+7	Iwabuchi 40'; Hasegawa 62'	Report	Kim Nam-hui 71' (pen.)	Stadium: Gelora Sriwijaya Stadium; Referee: Mahsa Ghorbani (Iran)

=== 2019 ===
27 February 2019 2019 Cyprus Women's Cup Group A	North Korea	4–2	Czech Republic	Pyla, Cyprus
14:30 UTC+3	Ju Hyo-sim 14'; Kim Yun-mi 18', 90+4'; Ri Hyang-sim 83'	Report	Bartoňová 63'; Szewieczková 85'	Stadium: Pyla Stadium

1 March 2019 2019 Cyprus Women's Cup Group A	South Africa	1–4	North Korea	Larnaca, Cyprus
14:30 UTC+3	Ramalepe 48'	Report	Kim Yun-mi 7', 23'; Ri Hyang-sim 13', 35'	Stadium: AEK Arena

4 March 2019 2019 Cyprus Women's Cup Group A	Finland	0–1	North Korea	Larnaca, Cyprus
18:00 UTC+3		Report	Jon Yun-so 45'	Stadium: Antonis Papadopoulos Stadium

6 March 2019 2019 Cyprus Women's Cup Final	North Korea	3–3 (a.e.t.) (7–6 p)	Italy	Larnaca, Cyprus
18:00 UTC+3	Kim Yun-mi 38'; Ju Hyo-sim 45+1'; Yon So-jon 106'	Report	Girelli 19'; Sabatino 79'; Cernoia 111'	Stadium: GSZ Stadium; Referee: Riem Hussein (Germany)
	Penalties
	Yon So-jon (penalty scored); Kim Yun-mi (penalty scored); Ju Hyo-sim (penalty scored); Pak Sin-jong (penalty scored); Pak Kyong-mi (penalty scored); Ri Pom-hyang (penalty scored); Ri Un-yong (penalty scored)		(penalty scored) Giugliano; (penalty scored) Girelli; (penalty scored) Serturini; (penalty scored) Cernoia; (penalty scored) Sabatino; (penalty scored) Salvai; (penalty missed) Bonansea

=== 2021 ===
September 2021 2022 AFC Women's Asian Cup qualification Group C	North Korea	Cancelled	Indonesia	Jakarta, Indonesia
--:-- UTC+9		Cancellation

September 2021 2022 AFC Women's Asian Cup qualification Group C	Iraq	Cancelled	North Korea	Jakarta, Indonesia
--:-- UTC+9		Cancellation

September 2021 2022 AFC Women's Asian Cup qualification Group C	North Korea	Cancelled	Singapore	Jakarta, Indonesia
--:-- UTC+9		Cancellation

=== 2023 ===
24 September 2022 Asian Games	North Korea	7–0	Singapore	Wenzhou, China
19:30 UTC+8	Hong Song-ok 11'; Ri Kum-hyang 14'; Myong Yu-jong 51'; Ju Hyo-sim 54'; Ri Hak 58'; Kim Kyong-yong 62'; Sung Hyang-sim 90+3'	Report		Stadium: Wenzhou Sports Centre; Attendance: 5,320; Referee: Haneen Murad (Jordan); Assistant referees: Heba Saadieh (Palestine); Islam Al-Abadi (Jordan); Fourth official: Doumouh Al Bakkar (Lebanon)

27 September 2022 Asian Games	Singapore	0–10	North Korea	Wenzhou, China
16:00 UTC+8		Report	Kim Kyong-yong 3', 19' (pen.), 36', 45+1', 90+7'; An Myong-song 15', 60'; Ri Myong-gum 17'; Myong Yu-jong 42'; Pong Song-ae 71'	Stadium: Wenzhou Sports Centre; Attendance: 3,669; Referee: Doumouh Al Bakkar (Lebanon); Assistant referees: Unurjargal Battsetseg (Mongolia); Islam Al-Abadi (Jordan); Fourth official: Haneen Murad (Jordan)

30 September 2022 Asian Games QF	South Korea	1–4	North Korea	Wenzhou, China
16:30 UTC+8	An Myong-song 11' (o.g.)	Report	Ri Hak 20', 90'; An Myong-song 81'; Kim Kyong-yong 90+5'	Stadium: Wenzhou Sports Centre; Attendance: 6,171; Referee: Pansa Chaisanit (Thailand)

3 October 2022 Asian Games SF	Uzbekistan	0–8	North Korea	Hangzhou, China
18:00 UTC+8		Report	Hong Song-ok 9'; Kim Kyong-yong 18' (pen.), 46', 63', 83'; An Myong-song 45+2'; Ri Hak 50'; Kim Hye-yong 90+1'	Stadium: Shangcheng Sports Centre Stadium; Attendance: 10,402; Referee: Le Thi Ly (Vietnam)

6 October 2022 Asian Games F	Japan	4–1	North Korea	Hangzhou, China
20:00 UTC+8	Nakashima 10'; Osawa 65'; Tanikawa 69'; Chiba 72'	Report	Kim Kyong-yong 38'	Stadium: Huanglong Sports Centre Stadium; Attendance: 37,166; Referee: Veronika Bernatskaia (Kyrgyzstan)

26 October 2024 Olympic Qualifiers R2	China	1–2	North Korea	Xiamen, China
19:35 UTC+8	Yan Jinjin 51'	Report	Sung Hyang-sim 5'; Han Jin-hong 76'	Stadium: Xiamen Egret Stadium; Referee: Kate Jacewicz (Australia)

29 October 2024 Olympic Qualifiers R2	North Korea	0–0	South Korea	Xiamen, China
15:30 UTC+8		Report		Stadium: Xiamen Egret Stadium; Attendance: 7,582; Referee: Lê Thị Lý (Vietnam)

1 November 2024 Olympic Qualifiers R2	Thailand	0–7	North Korea	Xiamen, China
15:30 UTC+8		Report	Kim Kyong-yong 22', 27', 59'; Sung Hyang-sim 24'; Kim Jong-sim 80'; Ri Hak 86'; Ju Hyo-sim 89'	Stadium: Xiamen Egret Stadium; Attendance: 869; Referee: Plong Pich Akara (Cambodia)

30 November 2024 EAFF E-1 Football Championship PR	Hong Kong	0–11	North Korea	Zhuhai, China
16:00 UTC+8		Report	Sung Hyang-sim 5', 16'; Choe Kum-ok 13', 29'; Kim Kyong-yong 32'; Chung Pui Ki 45' (o.g.); Ri Su-jong 50'; Hong Song-ok 67'; Kim Jong-sim 73'; Ri Hak 90+1'; Han Jin-hong 90+2'	Stadium: Suoka Sports Training Base Pitch 2 Referee: Dong Fangyu (China PR)

2 December 2024 EAFF E-1 Football Championship PR	North Korea	19–0	Mongolia	Zhuhai, China
16:00 UTC+8	Kim Chung-mi 4', 26', 83'; Hong Song-ok 6', 19', 75'; Han Jin-hong 9'; Kim Jong-sim 12', 53'; Song Chun-sim 14'; Pong Song-ae 16', 90'; Ju Hyo-sim 51' (pen.); Kim Hye-yong 55', 65'; Ri Su-jong 69', 85', 87'; Myong Yu-jong 80'	Report		Stadium: Suoka Sports Training Base Pitch 2 Referee: Tien Jin (China)

4 December 2024 EAFF E-1 Football Championship PR	Northern Mariana Islands	0–17	North Korea	Zhuhai, China
10:00 UTC+8		Report	Han Jin-hong 4', 59', 61'; Kim Jong-sim 19'; Kim Hye-yong 30', 46', 49'; Ri Su-jong 35', 71'; Kim Chung-mi 41'; Song Chun-sim 43'; Pong Song-ae 55'; Ri Kum-hyang 64' (pen.); Choe Kum-ok 66'; Hong Song-ok 73'; Sung Hyang-sim 86'; Kim Kyong-yong 90'	Stadium: Suoka Sports Training Base Pitch 2 Referee: Dong Fangyu (China)

7 December 2024 EAFF E-1 Football Championship PR Final	North Korea	5–0	Chinese Taipei	Taipa, Macau
20:00 UTC+8	Choe Kum-ok 26'; Ri Hak 35', 40', 64'; Song Chun-sim 55'	Report		Stadium: Estádio Campo Desportivo

=== 2024 ===
24 February 2024 Olympic Qualifiers R3	North Korea	0–0	Japan	Jeddah, Saudi Arabia
16:04 UTC+3		Report		Stadium: Prince Abdullah Al Faisal Stadium; Attendance: 100; Referee: Lê Thị Lý (Vietnam)

28 February 2024 Olympic Qualifiers R3	Japan	2–1 (2–1 agg.)	North Korea	Tokyo, Japan
18:34 UTC+9	Takahashi 26'; Fujino 76'	Report	Kim Hye-yong 81'	Stadium: Japan National Stadium; Attendance: 45,787; Referee: Casey Reibelt (Australia)

12 July Friendly	Russia	0–3	North Korea	Moscow, Russia
20:00 UTC+3		Report (FIFA)	Hong Song-ok 30'; Han Jin-hong 34'; Kim Su-rim 85'	Stadium: Moskvich stadium

15 July Friendly	Russia	0–0	North Korea	Moscow, Russia
19:00 UTC+3		Report (FIFA)		Stadium: Moskvich stadium

=== 2025 ===
29 June 2026 AFC Women's Asian Cup qualification	North Korea	10–0	Tajikistan	Dushanbe, Tajikistan
22:00 UTC+5	Kim Kyong-yong 9', 39', 41', 45+4' (pen.); Myong Yu-jong 23'; Hong Song-ok 26'; Ri Hak 28', 36'; Han Jin-hong 54'; Kim Song-gyong 62' (pen.)	Report		Stadium: Pamir Stadium; Referee: Rawdha Almansoori (United Arab Emirates)

2 July 2026 AFC Women's Asian Cup qualification	Palestine	0–10	North Korea	Dushanbe, Tajikistan
19:00 UTC+5		Report	Kim Kyong-yong 13', 45+2'; Ri Hak 27'; Chae Un-yong 29'; Myong Yu-jong 31', 45+3', 62', 88' (pen.); Kord 58' (o.g.); Kim Song-gyong 90+4'	Referee: Roziyabonu Yusupova (Uzbekistan)

5 July 2026 AFC Women's Asian Cup qualification	North Korea	6–0	Malaysia	Dushanbe, Tajikistan
19:00 UTC+5	Hye-yong 39'; Yu-jong 46'; Kyong-yong 52', 55', 78'; Hye-gyong 90+6'	Report		Stadium: Pamir Stadium; Referee: Rawdha Almansoori (United Arab Emirates)

27 November Friendly	North Korea	5–2	Russia	Pyongyang, North Korea
15:00 UTC+9	Ri Myong-gum 19'; Myong Yu-jong 30', 60' (pen.); Han Jin-hong 73'; Kim Song-gyong 87'	Report	Zharkova 8'; Kozhnikova 50'	Stadium: Kim Il Sung Stadium

30 November Friendly	North Korea	1–1	Russia	Pyongyang, North Korea
15:00 UTC+9	Ri Hak 90'	Report	Butkevich 34'	Stadium: Kim Il Sung Stadium

=== 2026 ===
3 March 2026 AFC Women's Asian Cup	North Korea	3–0	Uzbekistan	Sydney, Australia
13:00 UTC+11	Myong Yu-jong 6', 24' (pen.), 41' (pen.)	Report (AFC); Report (FIFA)		Stadium: Western Sydney Stadium; Attendance: 1,268; Referee: Casey Reibelt (Australia)

6 March 2026 AFC Women's Asian Cup	Bangladesh	0–5	North Korea	Sydney, Australia
13:00 UTC+11		Report (AFC); Report (FIFA)	Myong Yu-jong 45+5' (pen.); Kim Kyong-yong 45+7', 64'; Chae Un-yong 62'; Kim Hye-yong 90'	Stadium: Western Sydney Stadium; Attendance: 2,102; Referee: Doumouh Al Bakkar (Lebanon)

9 March 2026 AFC Women's Asian Cup	North Korea	1–2	China	Sydney, Australia
20:00 UTC+11	Kim Kyong-yong 32'	Report (AFC); Report (FIFA)	Chen Qiaozhu 34'; Wang Shuang 45+4'	Stadium: Western Sydney Stadium; Attendance: 9,093; Referee: Lê Thị Ly (Vietnam)

13 March 2026 AFC Women's Asian Cup	Australia	2–1	North Korea	Perth, Australia
18:00 UTC+8	Kennedy 9'; Kerr 47'	Report (AFC); Report (FIFA)	Chae Un-yong 65'	Stadium: Perth Rectangular Stadium; Attendance: 16,466; Referee: Veronika Bernatskaia (Kyrgyzstan)

19 March 2026 AFC Women's Asian Cup	North Korea	4–0	Chinese Taipei	Gold Coast, Australia
19:00 UTC+10	Hong Song-ok 32', 49', 68'; Kim Kyong-yong 52'	Report (AFC); Report (FIFA)		Stadium: Gold Coast Stadium; Attendance: 2,684; Referee: Asaka Koizumi (Japan)

14 September 2026 Asian Games GS	North Korea	10–0	Bangladesh	Osaka, Japan
16:00 UTC+9	Jon Ryong-Jong 5', 10'; Hwang Yu-Yong 12'; Chae Un-Yong 18', 35'; Kim Kyong-yong 40', 43'; Ri Song-a 51'; Jong Kum 60'; Han Jin-Hong 90'	Report		Stadium: Nagai Stadium; Referee: Plong Pich Akara (Cambodia)

17 September 2026 Asian Games GS	Myanmar	0–8	North Korea	Osaka, Japan
19:30 UTC+9		Report	Ri Myong-gum 10'; Ri Song-a 18' (pen.); Khin Marlar Tun 37' (o.g.); Jon Ryong-jong 40', 42'; Choe Kum-ok 58', 77'; Jong Kum 66'	Stadium: Nagai Stadium; Attendance: 855; Referee: Mu Mingxin (China)

21 September 2026 Asian Games GS	South Korea	1–1	North Korea	Fukuroi, Japan
16:00 UTC+9	Yun Su-jeong 46'	Report	Chae Un-yong 35'	Stadium: Shizuoka Stadium; Attendance: 2,032; Referee: Supiree Testhomya (Thailand)

25 September 2026 Asian Games QF	North Korea	5–1	Chinese Taipei	Fukuroi, Japan
15:00 UTC+9	Song Chun-sim 21'; Myong Ju-yong 29'; Kim Kyong-yong 34'; Choe Kum-ok 64'; Kim Song-gyong 86'	Report	Chen Yu-chin 90+2'	Stadium: Shizuoka Stadium; Attendance: 477; Referee: Veronika Bernatskaia (Kyrgyzstan)

29 September 2026 Asian Games SF	North Korea	2–0	China	Fukuroi, Japan
15:00 UTC+9	Yao Wei 53' (o.g.); Myong Yu-jong 79'	Report		Stadium: Shizuoka Stadium; Attendance: 564; Referee: Veronika Bernatskaia (Kyrgyzstan)

2 October 2026 Asian Games Final	North Korea	2–2 (a.e.t.) (3–5 p)	Japan	Fukuroi, Japan
19:30 UTC+9	Jong Kum 47'; Jon Ryong-jong 69'	Report	Ueno 32'; Nishio 86'	Stadium: Shizuoka Stadium; Attendance: 6,243; Referee: Supiree Testhomya (Thailand)
	Penalties
	Myong Yu-jong (penalty scored); Jon Ryong-jong (penalty scored); Jong Kum (penalty missed); Ri Hye-gyong (penalty scored)		(penalty scored) Takarada; (penalty scored) Mizuno; (penalty scored) Kuwahara; (penalty scored) Nishio; (penalty scored) Shiokoshi

== See also ==
- North Korea national football team results
