= North Korea at the FIFA Women's World Cup =

The North Korea women's national football team has represented North Korea (Korea DPR) at the FIFA Women's World Cup at four stagings of the tournament; they appeared in every edition from 1999 to 2011.

== FIFA Women's World Cup record ==
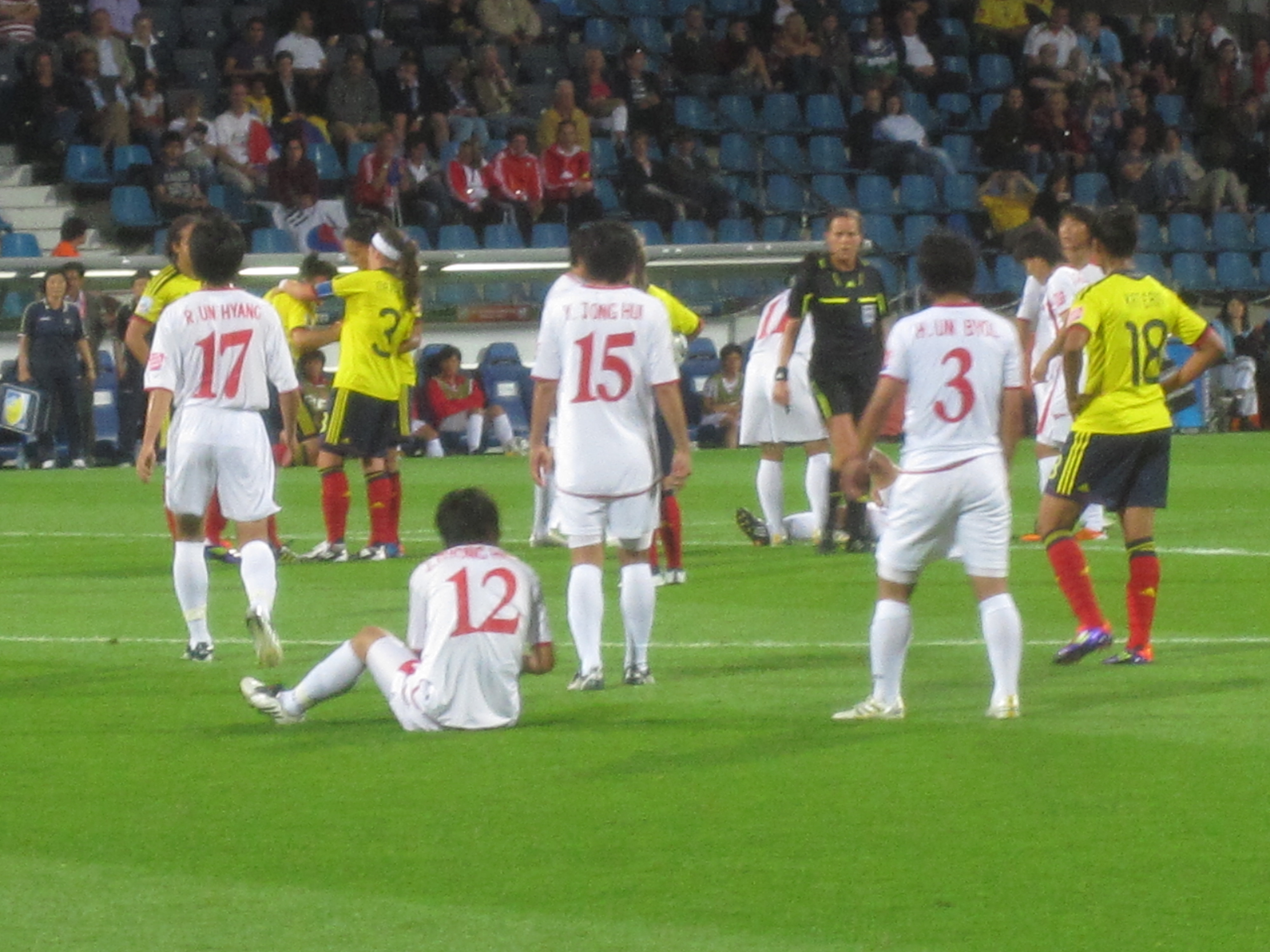
The team at the 2011 FIFA Women's World Cup

FIFA Women's World Cup Finals record
Year	Result	GP	W	D*	L	GF	GA	GD
(China) 1991	Did not qualify							
(Sweden) 1995	Did not enter							
(United States) 1999	Group stage	3	1	0	2	4	6	−2
(United States) 2003	Group stage	3	1	0	2	3	4	−1
(China) 2007	Quarter-finals	4	1	1	2	5	7	−2
(Germany) 2011	Group stage	3	0	1	2	0	3	−3
(Canada) 2015	Banned							
(France) 2019	Did not qualify							
(Australia) (New Zealand) 2023	Withdrew							
(Brazil) 2027	Qualified							
(Costa Rica) (Jamaica) (Mexico) (United States) 2031	To be determined							
(United Kingdom) 2035	To be determined							
Total	5/10	13	3	2	8	12	20	−8

*Draws include knockout matches decided on penalty kicks.

FIFA Women's World Cup history
Year	Round	Date	Opponent	Result	Stadium
(United States) 1999	Group stage	20 June	Nigeria	L 1–2	Rose Bowl, Pasadena
(United States) 1999	Group stage	24 June	Denmark	W 3–1	Civic Stadium, Portland
(United States) 1999	Group stage	27 June	United States	L 0–3	Foxboro Stadium, Foxborough
(United States) 2003	Group stage	20 September	Nigeria	W 3–0	Lincoln Financial Field, Philadelphia
(United States) 2003	Group stage	25 September	Sweden	L 0–1	Lincoln Financial Field, Philadelphia
(United States) 2003	Group stage	28 September	United States	L 0–3	Columbus Crew Stadium, Columbus
(China) 2007	Group stage	11 September	United States	D 2–2	Chengdu Sports Center, Chengdu
(China) 2007	Group stage	14 September	Nigeria	W 2–0	Chengdu Sports Center, Chengdu
(China) 2007	Group stage	18 September	Sweden	L 1–2	Tianjin Olympic Centre Stadium, Tianjin
(China) 2007	Quarter-finals	22 September	Germany	L 0–3	Wuhan Stadium, Wuhan
(Germany) 2011	Group stage	28 June	United States	L 0–2	Rudolf-Harbig-Stadion, Dresden
(Germany) 2011	Group stage	2 July	Sweden	L 0–1	Impuls Arena, Augsburg
(Germany) 2011	Group stage	6 July	Colombia	D 0–0	Ruhrstadion, Bochum
(Brazil) 2027	Group stage				

== Head-to-head record ==
Opponent	Pld	W	D	L	GF	GA	GD	Win %
Colombia	1	0	1	0	0	0	+0	0.00
Denmark	1	1	0	0	3	1	+2	100.00
Germany	1	0	0	1	0	3	−3	0.00
Nigeria	3	2	0	1	6	2	+4	66.67
Sweden	3	0	0	3	1	4	−3	0.00
United States	4	0	1	3	2	10	−8	0.00
Total	13	3	2	8	12	20	−8	23.08

== 1999 FIFA Women's World Cup ==
=== Group A ===
Pos	Team	Pld	W	D	L	GF	GA	GD	Pts	Qualification
1	United States (H)	3	3	0	0	13	1	+12	9	Advance to knockout stage
2	Nigeria	3	2	0	1	5	8	−3	6	Advance to knockout stage
3	North Korea	3	1	0	2	4	6	−2	3	
4	Denmark	3	0	0	3	1	8	−7	0	

Source: FIFA
Rules for classification: Group stage tiebreakers
(H) Hosts
20 June 1999
18:30 PDT (UTC−7)

North Korea	1–2	Nigeria
Jo 74'	Report	Akide 50'; Nwadike 79'

Rose Bowl, Pasadena
Attendance: 17,100
Referee: Katriina Elovirta (Finland)
24 June 1999
18:00 PDT (UTC−7)

North Korea	3–1	Denmark
Jin 15'; Jo 39'; Kim 73'	Report	Johansen 74'

Civic Stadium, Portland
Attendance: 20,129
Referee: Martha Toro (Colombia)
27 June 1999
19:00 EDT (UTC−4)

United States	3–0	North Korea
MacMillan 56'; Venturini 68', 76'	Report

Foxboro Stadium, Foxborough
Attendance: 50,484
Referee: Katriina Elovirta (Finland)

== 2003 FIFA Women's World Cup ==
=== Group A ===
Pos	Team	Pld	W	D	L	GF	GA	GD	Pts	Qualification
1	United States (H)	3	3	0	0	11	1	+10	9	Advance to knockout stage
2	Sweden	3	2	0	1	5	3	+2	6	Advance to knockout stage
3	North Korea	3	1	0	2	3	4	−1	3	
4	Nigeria	3	0	0	3	0	11	−11	0	

Source: FIFA
Rules for classification: Group stage tiebreakers
(H) Hosts
20 September 2003
14:45 EDT

Nigeria	0–3	North Korea
	Report	Jin Pyol-hui 13', 88'; Ri Un-gyong 73'

Lincoln Financial Field, Philadelphia
Attendance: 24,347
Referee: Nicole Petignat (Switzerland)
25 September 2003
16:45 EDT

Sweden	1–0	North Korea
Svensson 7'	Report

Lincoln Financial Field, Philadelphia
Attendance: 31,553
Referee: Tammy Ogston (Australia)
28 September 2003
15:45 EDT

North Korea	0–3	United States
	Report	Wambach 17' (pen.); Reddick 48', 66'

Columbus Crew Stadium, Columbus
Attendance: 22,828
Referee: Sueli Tortura (Brazil)

== 2007 FIFA Women's World Cup ==
=== Group B ===
Pos	Team	Pld	W	D	L	GF	GA	GD	Pts	Qualification
1	United States	3	2	1	0	5	2	+3	7	Advance to knockout stage
2	North Korea	3	1	1	1	5	4	+1	4	Advance to knockout stage
3	Sweden	3	1	1	1	3	4	−1	4	
4	Nigeria	3	0	1	2	1	4	−3	1	

Source: FIFA
Rules for classification: Group stage tiebreakers
11 September 2007
17:00

United States	2–2	North Korea
Wambach 50'; O'Reilly 69'	Report	Kil Son-Hui 58'; Kim Yong-Ae 60'

Chengdu Sports Center, Chengdu
Attendance: 35,100
Referee: Nicole Petignat (Switzerland)
14 September 2007
20:00

North Korea	2–0	Nigeria
Kim Kyong-Hwa 17'; Ri Kum-Suk 21'	Report

Chengdu Sports Center, Chengdu
Attendance: 35,600
Referee: Tammy Ogston (Australia)
18 September 2007
20:00

North Korea	1–2	Sweden
Ri Un Suk 22'	Report	Schelin 4', 54'

Tianjin Olympic Centre Stadium
Attendance: 33,196
Referee: Christine Beck (Germany)

=== Quarterfinals ===
22 September 2007
17:00

Germany	3–0	North Korea
Garefrekes 44'; Lingor 67'; Krahn 72'	Report

Wuhan Stadium
Attendance: 37,200
Referee: Tammy Ogston (Australia)

== 2011 FIFA Women's World Cup ==
=== Group C ===
Pos	Team	Pld	W	D	L	GF	GA	GD	Pts	Qualification
1	Sweden	3	3	0	0	4	1	+3	9	Advance to knockout stage
2	United States	3	2	0	1	6	2	+4	6	Advance to knockout stage
3	North Korea	3	0	1	2	0	3	−3	1	
4	Colombia	3	0	1	2	0	4	−4	1	

Source: FIFA
Rules for classification: Group stage tiebreakers
28 June 2011
18:15

United States	2–0	North Korea
Cheney 54'; Buehler 76'	Report

Rudolf-Harbig-Stadion, Dresden
Attendance: 21,859
Referee: Bibiana Steinhaus (Germany)
2 July 2011
14:00

North Korea	0–1	Sweden
	Report	Dahlkvist 64'

Impuls Arena, Augsburg
Attendance: 23,768
Referee: Estela Álvarez (Argentina)
6 July 2011
20:45

North Korea	0–0	Colombia
	Report

Ruhrstadion, Bochum
Attendance: 7,805
Referee: Christina W. Pedersen (Norway)

== 2027 FIFA Women's World Cup ==
To be confirmed.

== Goalscorers ==
Player	Goals	1999	2003	2007	2011	2015	2019	2023	2027
Jin Pyol-hui	3	1	2						
Jo Song-ok	2	2							
Kim Kum-sil	1	1							
Ri Un-gyong	1		1						
Ri Kum-suk	1			1					
Kim Kyong-hwa	1			1					
Kil Son-hui	1			1					
Ri Un-suk	1			1					
Kim Yong-ae	1			1					
Total	12	4	3	5	0	–	–	–	
