= Football at the 2006 Asian Games – Women's tournament =

Women's Football Tournament at the 2006 Asian Games
- Venue: Al-Arabi Stadium; Al-Gharrafa Stadium; Al-Rayyan Stadium; Qatar SC Stadium
- Date: 30 November – 13 December
- Competitors: 143 from 8 nations

Medalists
| gold medal | North Korea |
| silver medal | Japan |
| bronze medal | China |

The women's football tournament at the 2006 Asian Games was held from 30 November to 13 December 2006 in Doha and Al-Rayyan, Qatar.

== Results ==
All times are Arabia Standard Time (UTC+03:00)

=== Preliminary round ===
==== Group A ====
| Pos | Team | Pld | W | D | L | GF | GA | GD | Pts |
|---|---|---|---|---|---|---|---|---|---|
| 1 | Japan | 3 | 3 | 0 | 0 | 18 | 0 | +18 | 9 |
| 2 | China | 3 | 2 | 0 | 1 | 19 | 1 | +18 | 6 |
| 3 | Thailand | 3 | 1 | 0 | 2 | 5 | 11 | −6 | 3 |
| 4 | Jordan | 3 | 0 | 0 | 3 | 0 | 30 | −30 | 0 |

Source: RSSSF
30 November
17:15

| Japan | 13–0 | Jordan |
|---|---|---|
| Yanagita 16', 71'; Miyama 20'; Sudo 32'; Arakawa 34'; Sakaguchi 49', 54', 65', 77', 81'; Sawa 78', 90'; Sakai 85' |

Al-Arabi Stadium, Doha
Attendance: 251
Referee: Ri Hong-sil (North Korea)

30 November
19:45

| China | 7–0 | Thailand |
|---|---|---|
| Wang Kun 3'; Han Duan 7', 21', 45'; Yuan Fan 41', 53'; Wang Dandan 73' |

Al-Arabi Stadium, Doha
Attendance: 262
Referee: Bentla D'Coth (India)

4 December
17:15

| Thailand | 0–4 | Japan |
|---|---|---|
| | | Sakaguchi 42'; Ono 65'; Arakawa 77'; Ando 90' |

Al-Gharrafa Stadium, Al Rayyan
Attendance: 130
Referee: Hong Eun-ah (South Korea)

4 December
19:45

| Jordan | 0–12 | China |
|---|---|---|
| | | Han Duan 9', 15', 45+2', 47'; Ren Liping 22', 35'; Wang Kun 26', 39'; Al-Zogheir 28' (o.g.); Li Jie 65'; Ma Xiaoxu 68', 73' |

Al-Gharrafa Stadium, Al Rayyan
Attendance: 52
Referee: Krystyna Szokolai (Australia)

7 December
19:45

| China | 0–1 | Japan |
|---|---|---|
| | | Iwashimizu 27' |

Al-Rayyan Stadium, Al Rayyan
Attendance: 1,198
Referee: Hong Eun-ah (South Korea)

7 December
19:45

| Jordan | 0–5 | Thailand |
|---|---|---|
| | | Darut 27'; Supaporn 39'; Chidtawan 48'; Sukunya 70', 83' |

Al-Arabi Stadium, Doha
Attendance: 157
Referee: Deng Junxia (China)

==== Group B ====
| Pos | Team | Pld | W | D | L | GF | GA | GD | Pts |
|---|---|---|---|---|---|---|---|---|---|
| 1 | North Korea | 3 | 3 | 0 | 0 | 13 | 1 | +12 | 9 |
| 2 | South Korea | 3 | 2 | 0 | 1 | 6 | 5 | +1 | 6 |
| 3 | Chinese Taipei | 3 | 1 | 0 | 2 | 3 | 7 | −4 | 3 |
| 4 | Vietnam | 3 | 0 | 0 | 3 | 2 | 11 | −9 | 0 |

Source: RSSSF
30 November
17:15

| South Korea | 2–0 | Chinese Taipei |
|---|---|---|
| Ji So-yun 13', 67' |

Qatar SC Stadium, Doha
Attendance: 203
Referee: Mariko Iwaki (Japan)

30 November
19:45

| North Korea | 5–0 | Vietnam |
|---|---|---|
| Kil Son-hui 5', 45'; Ri Un-gyong 17'; Kim Kyong-hwa 22'; Ri Kum-suk 27' |

Qatar SC Stadium, Doha
Attendance: 500
Referee: Niu Huijun (China)

4 December
17:15

| Vietnam | 1–3 | South Korea |
|---|---|---|
| Bùi Thị Tuyết Mai 79' | | Kim Jin-hee 2'; Park Hee-young 6'; Kim Joo-hee 60' |

Al-Rayyan Stadium, Al Rayyan
Attendance: 450
Referee: Deng Junxia (China)

4 December
19:45

| Chinese Taipei | 0–4 | North Korea |
|---|---|---|
| | | Kim Kyong-hwa 6', 53'; Ri Un-suk 49'; Ho Sun-hui 55' |

Al-Rayyan Stadium, Al Rayyan
Attendance: 450
Referee: Pannipar Kamnueng (Thailand)

7 December
17:15

| North Korea | 4–1 | South Korea |
|---|---|---|
| Ri Kum-suk 10', 17'; Kim Kyong-hwa 12'; Ri Un-gyong 70' | | Park Hee-young 25' |

Al-Rayyan Stadium, Al Rayyan
Attendance: 1,198
Referee: Bentla D'Coth (India)

7 December
17:15

| Chinese Taipei | 3–1 | Vietnam |
|---|---|---|
| Tsai Li-chen 6', 41'; Lee Hsueh-hua 90+3' (pen.) | | Bùi Thị Tuyết Mai 19' |

Al-Arabi Stadium, Doha
Attendance: 223
Referee: Ri Hong-sil (North Korea)

=== Knockout round ===
Semifinals
10 December
Japan | 3
South Korea | 1
10 December
North Korea (aet) | 3
China | 1

Gold medal match
13 December
Japan | 0 (2)
North Korea (p) | 0 (4)
Bronze medal match
13 December
South Korea | 0
China | 2

==== Semifinals ====
10 December
16:00

| Japan | 3–1 | South Korea |
|---|---|---|
| Iwashimizu 47'; Yanagita 72'; Nagasato 82' | | Park Hee-young 89' |

Qatar SC Stadium, Doha
Attendance: 224
Referee: Krystyna Szokolai (Australia)

10 December
19:00

| North Korea | 3–1 (a.e.t.) | China |
|---|---|---|
| Kil Son-hui 21'; Ri Kum-suk 94'; Ri Un-gyong 99' | | Wang Dandan 10' |

Qatar SC Stadium, Doha
Attendance: 3,024
Referee: Bentla D'Coth (India)

==== Bronze medal match ====
13 December
16:00

| South Korea | 0–2 | China |
|---|---|---|
| | | Wang Kun 40', 66' |

Qatar SC Stadium, Doha
Attendance: 1,032
Referee: Pannipar Kamnueng (Thailand)

==== Gold medal match ====
13 December
19:00

| Japan | 0–0 (a.e.t.) | North Korea |
Penalties
| Sawa (penalty missed); Ando (penalty missed); Nagasato (penalty scored); Nakaoka (penalty scored) | 2–4 | (penalty scored) Ri Kum-suk; (penalty scored) Ri Un-gyong; (penalty scored) Ho Sun-hui; (penalty scored) Jong Pok-sim |

Qatar SC Stadium, Doha
Attendance: 4,830
Referee: Niu Huijun (China)

== Goalscorers ==
7 goals

- Han Duan (CHN)

6 goals

- Mizuho Sakaguchi (JPN)

5 goals

- Wang Kun (CHN)

4 goals

- Kim Kyong-hwa (PRK)
- Ri Kum-suk (PRK)

3 goals

- Miyuki Yanagita (JPN)
- Park Hee-young (KOR)
- Kil Son-hui (PRK)
- Ri Un-gyong (PRK)

2 goals

- Ma Xiaoxu (CHN)
- Ren Liping (CHN)
- Wang Dandan (CHN)
- Yuan Fan (CHN)
- Eriko Arakawa (JPN)
- Azusa Iwashimizu (JPN)
- Homare Sawa (JPN)
- Ji So-yun (KOR)
- Sukunya Peangthem (THA)
- Tsai Li-chen (TPE)
- Bùi Thị Tuyết Mai (VIE)

1 goal

- Li Jie (CHN)
- Kozue Ando (JPN)
- Aya Miyama (JPN)
- Yuki Nagasato (JPN)
- Shinobu Ono (JPN)
- Tomoe Sakai (JPN)
- Akiko Sudo (JPN)
- Kim Jin-hee (KOR)
- Kim Joo-hee (KOR)
- Ho Sun-hui (PRK)
- Ri Un-suk (PRK)
- Chidtawan Chawong (THA)
- Darut Changplook (THA)
- Supaporn Gaewbaen (THA)
- Lee Hsueh-hua (TPE)

1 own goal

- Suha Al-Zogheir (JOR) (against CHN)

== Final standing ==
| Rank | Team | Pld | W | D | L | GF | GA | GD | Pts |
|---|---|---|---|---|---|---|---|---|---|
| 1st place, gold medalist(s) | North Korea | 5 | 4 | 1 | 0 | 16 | 2 | +14 | 13 |
| 2nd place, silver medalist(s) | Japan | 5 | 4 | 1 | 0 | 21 | 1 | +20 | 13 |
| 3rd place, bronze medalist(s) | China | 5 | 3 | 0 | 2 | 22 | 4 | +18 | 9 |
| 4 | South Korea | 5 | 2 | 0 | 3 | 7 | 10 | −3 | 6 |
| 5 | Chinese Taipei | 3 | 1 | 0 | 2 | 3 | 7 | −4 | 3 |
| 6 | Thailand | 3 | 1 | 0 | 2 | 5 | 11 | −6 | 3 |
| 7 | Vietnam | 3 | 0 | 0 | 3 | 2 | 11 | −9 | 0 |
| 8 | Jordan | 3 | 0 | 0 | 3 | 0 | 30 | −30 | 0 |
