= North Korea national football team results =

This article summarizes the outcomes of all official matches played by the North Korea national football team by opponent and by period, since they first played in official competitions in 1956.

The North Korea national football team first played in the FIFA World Cup in 1966.

== Record per opponent ==
Last updated: Iran vs. North Korea, 10 June 2025. Statistics include official FIFA-recognised matches only.

Key

Positive balance (more wins than losses)
Neutral balance (as many wins as losses)
Negative balance (more losses than wins)

The following table shows North Korea's all-time official international record per opponent:

Opponent	Pld	W	D	L	GF	GA	GD	W%	Confederation
Afghanistan	1	1	0	0	2	0	+2	100.00	AFC
Algeria	1	1	0	0	3	1	+1	100.00	CONAF
Australia	3	2	1	0	10	3	+7	66.67	AFC
Bahrain	7	4	1	2	10	10	0	57.14	AFC
Bangladesh	2	2	0	0	4	2	+2	100.00	AFC
Brazil	1	0	0	1	1	2	−1	0.00	CONMEBOL
Bulgaria	3	0	0	3	1	12	−11	0.00	UEFA
Cambodia	2	2	0	0	6	0	+6	100.00	AFC
Canada	2	1	1	0	2	0	+2	50.00	CONCACAF
Chile	1	0	1	0	1	1	0	0.00	CONMEBOL
China	26	8	7	11	25	30	−5	30.77	AFC
Chinese Taipei	9	8	1	0	23	2	+21	88.88	AFC
Congo	1	0	1	0	0	0	0	0.00	CONAF
Cuba	3	0	2	1	0	1	−1	0.00	CONCACAF
Egypt	2	0	1	1	1	2	−1	0.00	CONAF
Finland	1	1	0	0	3	2	+1	100.00	UEFA
Greece	1	0	1	0	2	2	0	0.00	UEFA
Guam	5	5	0	0	42	3	+39	100.00	AFC
Guinea	1	1	0	0	3	0	+3	100.00	CONAF
Hong Kong	17	11	6	0	29	9	+20	64.70	AFC
India	11	10	1	0	30	7	+23	90.90	AFC
Indonesia	11	9	2	0	30	5	+25	81.81	AFC
Iran	25	0	7	18	9	38	−29	0.00	AFC
Iraq	11	4	1	6	10	10	0	36.36	AFC
Italy	1	1	0	0	1	0	+1	100.00	UEFA
Ivory Coast	1	0	0	1	0	3	−3	0.00	CONAF
Japan	20	7	4	9	14	20	−6	35.00	AFC
Jordan	8	3	2	3	6	8	−2	37.50	AFC
Kazakhstan	3	2	1	0	5	1	+4	66.67	UEFA
Kuwait	14	1	7	6	12	20	−8	7.14	AFC
Kyrgyzstan	3	1	1	1	6	3	+3	33.33	AFC
Laos	1	1	0	0	1	0	+1	100.00	AFC
Latvia	2	0	1	1	2	3	−1	0.00	UEFA
Lebanon	9	1	3	5	6	15	−9	11.11	AFC
Macau	3	3	0	0	12	1	+11	100.00	AFC
Malaysia	10	6	3	1	23	7	+16	60.00	AFC
Mali	1	1	0	0	1	0	+1	100.00	CONAF
Mexico	1	0	0	1	1	2	−1	0.00	CONCACAF
Mongolia	6	6	0	0	36	4	+32	100.00	AFC
Myanmar	9	7	2	0	26	4	+22	77.77	AFC
Nepal	4	4	0	0	11	1	+10	100.00	AFC
Nigeria	1	0	0	1	1	3	−3	0.00	CONAF
North Vietnam	6	6	0	0	17	2	+15	100.00	AFC
Norway	1	0	0	1	0	3	−3	0.00	UEFA
Oman	2	0	1	1	3	4	-1	0.00	AFC
Pakistan	1	0	1	0	0	0	0	0.00	AFC
Palestine	2	2	0	0	7	1	+6	100.00	AFC
Papua New Guinea	1	1	0	0	4	0	+4	100.00	OFC
Paraguay	1	0	0	1	0	1	−1	0.00	CONMEBOL
Philippines	4	2	1	1	7	4	+3	50.00	AFC
Poland	2	0	1	1	2	7	−5	0.00	UEFA
Portugal	2	0	0	2	3	12	−9	0.00	UEFA
Qatar	13	4	5	4	16	24	−8	30.76	AFC
Saudi Arabia	14	1	6	7	9	22	−13	7.14	AFC
Singapore	12	8	1	3	22	13	+9	66.67	AFC
Somalia	1	1	0	0	14	0	+14	100.00	CONAF
South Korea	19	1	10	8	6	17	−11	5.26	AFC
South Africa	1	0	1	0	0	0	0	0.00	CONAF
Soviet Union	2	0	0	2	0	6	−6	0.00	UEFA
Sweden	3	0	2	1	2	6	−4	0.00	UEFA
Sri Lanka	4	4	0	0	15	0	+15	100.00	AFC
Syria	13	4	5	4	15	18	−3	30.76	AFC
Tajikistan	6	4	1	1	6	2	+4	66.67	AFC
Thailand	20	11	5	4	36	17	+19	55.00	AFC
Turkmenistan	7	2	4	1	7	7	0	28.57	AFC
United Arab Emirates	16	4	7	5	17	16	+1	25.00	AFC
United States	1	1	0	0	2	1	+1	100.00	CONCACAF
Uzbekistan	12	1	2	9	7	22	−15	8.33	AFC
Venezuela	2	0	1	1	2	3	−1	0.00	CONMEBOL
Vietnam	8	3	4	1	10	7	+3	37.50	AFC
Yemen	6	4	2	0	20	3	+17	66.67	AFC
Zambia	1	0	0	1	1	4	−3	0.00	CONAF
Total	427	182	117	128	662	460	+202	42.62	—

== Results in chronological order ==
The summarizing tables below show North Korea's official matches per period. More extensive reports (with dates, scores, goal scorers and match circumstances) can be found on the main articles per period.

	Legend for encounters
Q	Qualification rounds
PR	Preliminary round
R + number	Round number
GS	Group Stage
SF	Semi-final
3rd-4th	Third place match

=== 1956–1979 ===
82 matches played:

=== 1980–1999 ===
100 matches played:

=== 2000–2009 ===
102 matches played:

=== 2010–2019 ===
118 matches played:

== See also ==
- North Korea women's national football team results
