= 2008 EAFF Women's Football Championship =

2008年东亚女子足球锦标赛

Tournament details
- Host country: China
- Dates: 1–5 July 2007 (Qualification); 18–24 February 2008 (Final)
- Teams: 7 (from 1 confederation)

Final positions
- Champions: Japan (1st title)
- Runners-up: North Korea
- Third place: China
- Fourth place: South Korea

Tournament statistics
- Matches played: 12
- Goals scored: 49 (4.08 per match)
- Top scorer: (Japan) Shinobu Ohno
- Best player: (Japan) Homare Sawa

The Second EAFF Women's Football Championship was a football competition held from 18 to 24 February 2008 in Chongqing, China. Japan won the second edition by beating its opponents to finish first, DPR Korea finished second. The winner of the tournament received 50,000 US dollars, the runner up $30,000, the third-placed team $20,000 and the fourth-placed team $15,000.

== Rounds ==
Round	Participants	Host	Date
Preliminary Competition	Guam, Chinese Taipei, Hong Kong, South Korea	Guam	1–5 July 2007
Final Round	China, Japan, North Korea, South Korea	China	18–24 February 2008

== Preliminary Competition ==
Korea Republic qualified to Final Round.

Team	Pts	Pld	W	D	L	GF	GA	GD
South Korea	9	3	3	0	0	13	1	+12
Chinese Taipei	6	3	2	0	1	14	4	+10
Hong Kong	3	3	1	0	2	2	12	−10
Guam	0	3	0	0	3	1	13	−12

1 July 2007
13:00

Guam	1–2	Hong Kong
Paulino 35'	Report	Kwong Wing Yan 6'; He Ying 68'

LeoPalace Resort Main Stadium, Guam
Attendance: 300
Referee: Funano Etsuko (Japan)
1 July 2007
16:00

Chinese Taipei	1–4	South Korea
Lin Yu-hui 70'	Report	Kim Joo-hee 15'; Park Hee-young 24'; Kim Yu-mi 29'; Jung Hae-in 88'

LeoPalace Resort Main Stadium, Guam
Attendance: 200
Referee: Gani Rita (Malaysia)

3 July 2007
13:00

South Korea	3–0	Hong Kong
Kim Yu-mi 30'; Lee Sae-eun 33'; Kim Joo-hee 56'	Report

LeoPalace Resort Main Stadium, Guam
Attendance: 300
Referee: Kamnueung Pannipar (Thailand)
3 July 2007
16:00

Guam	0–5	Chinese Taipei
	Report	Lin Chiung-ying 18', 65'; Tsai Li-chen 52', 77', 82'

LeoPalace Resort Main Stadium, Guam
Attendance: 300
Referee: Mai Hoang Trang (Vietnam)

5 July 2007
13:00

Chinese Taipei	8–0	Hong Kong
Yu Hsiu-chin 36'; Lin Yu-hui 49', 58', 64', 76'; Tsai Li-chen 61'; Kuo Tzu-hui 80'; Tseng Shu-o 88'	Report

LeoPalace Resort Main Stadium, Guam
Attendance: 100
Referee: Kamnueung Pannipar (Thailand)
5 July 2007
16:00

Guam	0–6	South Korea
	Report	Cha Yun-hee 1'; Kim Joo-hee 23', 26', 33', 49', 59'

LeoPalace Resort Main Stadium, Guam
Attendance: 300
Referee: Funano Etsuko (Japan)

== Final round ==
Team	Pts	Pld	W	D	L	GF	GA	GD
Japan	9	3	3	0	0	8	2	+6
North Korea	4	3	1	1	1	6	3	+3
China	4	3	1	1	1	3	5	−2
South Korea	0	3	0	0	3	2	9	−7

All times, local time

18 February 2008
17:00

North Korea	2–3	Japan
Ri Kum-suk 37'; Ri Un-gyong 54'	Report	Ando 3'; Miyama 81'; Sawa 90+3'

Yongchuan Stadium, Chongqing
Referee: Cha Sung-mi (Korea Republic)
18 February 2008
19:30

China	3–2	South Korea
Han Duan 9', 78'; Xu Yuan 86'	Report	Park Hee-young 59', 66'

Yongchuan Stadium, Chongqing
Attendance: 23,000
Referee: Pannipar Kamnueng (Thailand)

21 February 2008
17:00

Japan	2–0	South Korea
Arakawa 16'; Ohno 56'	Report

Yongchuan Stadium, Chongqing
Attendance: 20,000
Referee: Shen Huangying (China)
21 February 2008
19:30

China	0–0	North Korea
	Report

Yongchuan Stadium, Chongqing
Attendance: 23,000
Referee: Cha Sung-mi (Korea Republic)

24 February 2008
17:00

South Korea	0–4	North Korea
	Report	Kim Yong-ae 53', 78'; Hong Myong-gum 68'; Ri Kum-suk 69'

Yongchuan Stadium, Chongqing
Attendance: 25,000
Referee: Baba Sachiko (Japan)
24 February 2008
17:00

China	0–3	Japan
	Report	Ohno 19', 42'; Nagasato 55'

Yongchuan Stadium, Chongqing
Attendance: 25,000
Referee: Pannipar Kamnueng (Thailand)

== Personal Awards ==
- Fair play Team – Japan
- Best Goalkeeper – (China) Zhang Yanru
- Best Defender – (North Korea) Hong Myong-gum
- Top Scorer – (Japan) Shinobu Ohno
- MVP – (Japan) Homare Sawa
