= Ri Kum-suk =

North Korean footballer (born 1978)

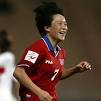

Personal information
- Date of birth: August 16, 1978 (age 48)
- Place of birth: Hamhung, North Korea
- Height: 1.71 m (5 ft 7 in)
- Position: Centre forward

Team information
- Current team: April 25 Sports Club
- Number: 10

Senior career*
Years	Team	Apps	(Gls)
?–present	April 25 Sports Club	178	(125)

International career
1998–2008	North Korea	123	(40)
- * Club domestic league appearances and goals as of 19:37, 3 November 2007 (UTC)

- Ri Kum-suk
- Hangul: 리금숙
- Hanja: 李今淑
- RR: Ri Geumsuk
- MR: Ri Kŭmsuk

Ri Kum-suk (Korean: 리금숙; Korean pronunciation: [ɾi.ɡɯm.suk] or [ɾi] [kɯm.suk]; born 16 August 1978) is a North Korean footballer who plays for April 25 Sports Club. She plays a key role not only for her club, but also for national teams in the AFC Women's Asian Cup, Asian Games and FIFA Women's World Cup. She is the highest goalscorer for North Korea with 40 goals and the most prolific female footballer ever from North Korea with 165 goals. She also won the title of People's Athlete in 2003.

== Club career ==
Ri Kum-suk began her international career at the 1999 FIFA Women's World Cup at age 20. She played as a midfielder during three matches, supporting their young and talented striker Jin Pyol-hui.

In 4 years, the PRK Women's National Team qualified for the 2003 FIFA Women's World Cup and Ri teamed again with her friend Jin. In a winning match 3-0 over Nigeria she took 5 shots and 2 shots on goal. Even though, her team could not proceed to the quarterfinals, she played very well in last two games against Sweden and United States, with 6 Shots and 1 SOG.

The 2007 FIFA Women's World Cup was her best tournament. The team qualified for the finals by taking 3rd place in 2006 AFC Women's Championship due to referee judgement during the game against China. Her team belonged to Group B with United States, Sweden and Nigeria.

At their first game, against USA, and with the injury of key midfielder Ho Sun-hui at 10 minutes in the first half, they conceded a goal 50 minutes, but scored at 58 and 62 minutes. At 69 minutes the USA scored again. Ri scored in the next game against Nigeria with a head shot and the team played well enough against Sweden to get out of the group stage.

The most game she showed her strike and dribble skill was against China PR in the 15th Doha Asian Games, when the two teams tied after 90 minutes. Ri Kum-suk scored a goal in the 2nd extra time, by striking a powerful shot with her left foot.

Ri pulled a hat-trick sending DPRK into the final of the AFC Women's Asian Cup after they defeated Australia 3–0 at Thong Nat Stadium in the 2007 AFC Women's Asian Cup.

Ri also played for DPRK at the 2008 Summer Olympics.

She is the captain of the national team. Recently she retired to start a coaching career. She married Pak Chung Hyok(student of Kim Hyong Jik University Education), coach of the women's football team of the Jebi Sports Team, in November 2008, and gave birth to a son.

== International goals ==
No.	Date	Venue	Opponent	Score	Result	Competition
1.	10 December 2001	New Taipei City, Taiwan	Japan	1–0	1–0	2001 AFC Women's Championship
2.	16 December 2001	New Taipei City, Taiwan	Japan	1–0	2–0	2001 AFC Women's Championship
3.	11 October 2002	Changwon, South Korea	Vietnam	3–0	4–0	2002 Asian Games
4.	10 June 2003	Bangkok, Thailand	Hong Kong	2–0	13–0	2003 AFC Women's Championship
5.	10 June 2003	Bangkok, Thailand	Hong Kong	6–0	13–0	2003 AFC Women's Championship
6.	10 June 2003	Bangkok, Thailand	Hong Kong	7–0	13–0	2003 AFC Women's Championship
7.	10 June 2003	Bangkok, Thailand	Hong Kong	8–0	13–0	2003 AFC Women's Championship
8.	10 June 2003	Bangkok, Thailand	Hong Kong	10–0	13–0	2003 AFC Women's Championship
9.	10 June 2003	Bangkok, Thailand	Hong Kong	11–0	13–0	2003 AFC Women's Championship
10.	12 June 2003	Bangkok, Thailand	Thailand	4–0	14–0	2003 AFC Women's Championship
11.	12 June 2003	Bangkok, Thailand	Thailand	5–0	14–0	2003 AFC Women's Championship
12.	12 June 2003	Bangkok, Thailand	Thailand	7–0	14–0	2003 AFC Women's Championship
13.	12 June 2003	Bangkok, Thailand	Thailand	11–0	14–0	2003 AFC Women's Championship
14.	14 June 2003	Bangkok, Thailand	Singapore	3–0	16–0	2003 AFC Women's Championship
15.	19 June 2003	Bangkok, Thailand	Japan	1–0	3–0	2003 AFC Women's Championship
16.	19 June 2003	Bangkok, Thailand	Japan	2–0	3–0	2003 AFC Women's Championship
17.	21 June 2003	Bangkok, Thailand	China	1–0	2–1 (a.e.t.)	2003 AFC Women's Championship
18.	21 June 2003	Bangkok, Thailand	China	2–1	2–1 (a.e.t.)	2003 AFC Women's Championship
19.	24 February 2004	Brisbane, Australia	New Zealand	1–0	11–0	2004 Australia Cup
20.	18 April 2004	Hiroshima, Japan	Chinese Taipei	1–0	4–0	2004 Summer Olympics qualification
21.	18 April 2004	Hiroshima, Japan	Chinese Taipei	4–0	4–0	2004 Summer Olympics qualification
22.	20 April 2004	Hiroshima, Japan	Hong Kong	4–0	9–0	2004 Summer Olympics qualification
23.	20 April 2004	Hiroshima, Japan	Hong Kong	5–0	9–0	2004 Summer Olympics qualification
24.	20 April 2004	Hiroshima, Japan	Hong Kong	9–0	9–0	2004 Summer Olympics qualification
25.	22 April 2004	Hiroshima, Japan	Singapore	3–0	8–0	2004 Summer Olympics qualification
26.	22 April 2004	Hiroshima, Japan	Singapore	4–0	8–0	2004 Summer Olympics qualification
27.	26 April 2004	Hiroshima, Japan	South Korea	2–0	5–1	2004 Summer Olympics qualification
28.	18 July 2006	Adelaide, Australia	Thailand	1–0	9–0	2006 AFC Women's Asian Cup
29.	18 July 2006	Adelaide, Australia	Thailand	3–0	9–0	2006 AFC Women's Asian Cup
30.	30 November 2006	Doha, Qatar	Vietnam	4–0	5–0	2006 Asian Games
31.	7 December 2006	Al-Rayyan, Qatar	South Korea	1–0	4–1	2006 Asian Games
32.	7 December 2006	Al-Rayyan, Qatar	South Korea	3–0	4–1	2006 Asian Games
33.	10 December 2006	Doha, Qatar	China	2–1	3–1 (a.e.t.)	2006 Asian Games
34.	3 June 2007	Pyongyang, North Korea	Australia	1–0	2–0	2008 Summer Olympics qualification
35.	3 June 2007	Pyongyang, North Korea	Australia	2–0	2–0	2008 Summer Olympics qualification
36.	10 June 2007	Coffs Harbour, Australia	Australia	1–0	2–0	2008 Summer Olympics qualification
37.	14 September 2007	Chengdu, China	Nigeria	2–0	2–0	2007 FIFA Women's World Cup
38.	18 February 2008	Chongqing, China	Japan	1–1	2–3	2008 EAFF Women's Football Championship
39.	24 February 2008	Chongqing, China	South Korea	3–0	4–0	2008 EAFF Women's Football Championship
40.	28 May 2008	Ho Chi Minh City, Vietnam	Thailand	2–0	5–0	2008 AFC Women's Asian Cup
41.	30 May 2008	Ho Chi Minh City, Vietnam	Vietnam	2–0	3–0	2008 AFC Women's Asian Cup
42.	30 May 2008	Ho Chi Minh City, Vietnam	Vietnam	3–0	3–0	2008 AFC Women's Asian Cup
43.	5 June 2008	Ho Chi Minh City, Vietnam	Australia	1–0	3–0	2008 AFC Women's Asian Cup
44.	5 June 2008	Ho Chi Minh City, Vietnam	Australia	2–0	3–0	2008 AFC Women's Asian Cup
45.	5 June 2008	Ho Chi Minh City, Vietnam	Australia	3–0	3–0	2008 AFC Women's Asian Cup
46.	8 June 2008	Ho Chi Minh City, Vietnam	China	1–1	2–1	2008 AFC Women's Asian Cup
47.	9 August 2008	Shenyang, China	Brazil	1–2	1–2	2008 Summer Olympics
