= Wang Kun (footballer) =

Chinese footballer

Medal record

Women's football

Representing China

Asian Games
Bronze medal – third place	2006 Doha	Team

Wang Kun (Chinese: 王坤; pinyin: Wáng Kūn, born October 20, 1985, in Zhangjiakou, Hebei) is a female Chinese football (soccer) player who competed at the 2004 Summer Olympics.

In 2004, she was a squad member of the Chinese team which finished ninth in the women's tournament.

== International goals ==
No.	Date	Venue	Opponent	Score	Result	Competition
1.	30 November 2006	Grand Hamad Stadium, Doha, Qatar	Thailand	1–0	7–0	2006 Asian Games
2.	4 December 2006	Thani bin Jassim Stadium, Doha, Qatar	Jordan	4–0	12–0	2006 Asian Games
3.	4 December 2006	Thani bin Jassim Stadium, Doha, Qatar	Jordan	7–0	12–0	2006 Asian Games
4.	13 December 2006	Suheim bin Hamad Stadium, Doha, Qatar	South Korea	1–0	2–0	2006 Asian Games
5.	13 December 2006	Suheim bin Hamad Stadium, Doha, Qatar	South Korea	2–0	2–0	2006 Asian Games
