= Ri Un-suk =

North Korean footballer

Personal information
- Date of birth: 1 January 1986 (age 40)
- Place of birth: North Korea
- Position: Midfielder

Senior career*
Years	Team	Apps	(Gls)
2008	April 25		

International career
2008	North Korea	55 (?)	(35)
- * Club domestic league appearances and goals

- Ri Un-suk
- Hangul: 리은숙
- RR: Ri Eunsuk
- MR: Ri Ŭnsuk

Ri Un-suk (born 1 January 1986) is a North Korean football midfielder who played for the North Korea women's national football team at the 2008 Summer Olympics. At the club level, she played for April 25.

== International goals ==
No.	Date	Venue	Opponent	Score	Result	Competition
1.	12 June 2003	Bangkok, Thailand	Thailand	13–0	14–0	2003 AFC Women's Championship
2.	14 June 2003	Bangkok, Thailand	Singapore	7–0	16–0	2003 AFC Women's Championship
3.	1 August 2005	Jeonju, South Korea	Japan	1–0	1–0	2005 EAFF Women's Football Championship
4.	18 July 2006	Adelaide, Australia	Thailand	2–0	9–0	2006 AFC Women's Asian Cup
5.	20 July 2006	Adelaide, Australia	Myanmar	1–0	3–0	2006 AFC Women's Asian Cup
6.	20 July 2006	Adelaide, Australia	Myanmar	2–0	3–0	2006 AFC Women's Asian Cup
7.	30 July 2006	Adelaide, Australia	Japan	1–0	3–2	2006 AFC Women's Asian Cup
8.	4 December 2006	Al-Rayyan, Qatar	Chinese Taipei	2–0	4–0	2006 Asian Games
9.	18 September 2007	Tianjin, China	Sweden	1–1	1–2	2007 FIFA Women's World Cup
10.	28 May 2008	Hồ Chí Minh City, Vietnam	Thailand	4–0	5–0	2008 AFC Women's Asian Cup

== See also ==
- North Korea at the 2008 Summer Olympics
