= Kim Yong-ae =

North Korean footballer (born 1983)

Personal information
- Date of birth: 7 March 1983 (age 43)
- Place of birth: North Korea
- Position: Forward

Senior career*
Years	Team	Apps	(Gls)
2008	April 25		

International career
2008	North Korea	20 (?)	(2)
- * Club domestic league appearances and goals

- Kim Yong-ae
- Hangul: 김영애
- RR: Gim Yeongae
- MR: Kim Yŏngae

Kim Yong-ae (Korean: 김영애; born 7 March 1983) is a North Korean football forward who played for the North Korea women's national football team. She competed at the 2008 Summer Olympics. At the club level, she played for April 25.

== International goals ==
No.	Date	Venue	Opponent	Score	Result	Competition
1.	18 July 2006	Adelaide, Australia	Thailand	7–0	9–0	2006 AFC Women's Asian Cup
2.	18 July 2006	Adelaide, Australia	Thailand	9–0	9–0	2006 AFC Women's Asian Cup
3.	24 July 2006	Adelaide, Australia	South Korea	1–0	1–0	2006 AFC Women's Asian Cup
4.	11 September 2007	Chengdu, China	United States	2–1	2–2	2007 FIFA Women's World Cup
5.	24 February 2008	Chongqing, China	South Korea	1–0	4–0	2008 EAFF Women's Football Championship
6.	24 February 2008	Chongqing, China	South Korea	4–0	4–0	2008 EAFF Women's Football Championship
7.	28 May 2008	Hồ Chí Minh City, Vietnam	Thailand	5–0	5–0	2008 AFC Women's Asian Cup
8.	20 May 2010	Chengdu, China	Thailand	2–0	3–0	2010 AFC Women's Asian Cup

== See also ==
- North Korea at the 2008 Summer Olympics
