= Ho Sun-hui =

North Korean footballer (born 1980)

Personal information
- Date of birth: 5 March 1980 (age 46)
- Place of birth: North Korea
- Position: Midfielder

Senior career*
Years	Team	Apps	(Gls)
2008	Amrokkang		

International career
2008	North Korea	115 (?)	(7)
Korean name
Hangul	허순희
RR	Heo Sunhui
MR	Hŏ Sunhŭi
- * Club domestic league appearances and goals

Ho Sun-hui (Korean: 허순희; born 5 March 1980) is a female North Korean former football midfielder and now a referee.

She was part of the North Korea women's national football team at the 2008 Summer Olympics. On club level she played for Amrokkang.

== International goals ==
No.	Date	Venue	Opponent	Score	Result	Competition
1.	10 June 2003	Bangkok, Thailand	Hong Kong	9–0	13–0	2003 AFC Women's Championship
2.	12 June 2003	Bangkok, Thailand	Singapore	2–0	16–0	2003 AFC Women's Championship
3.	12 June 2003	Bangkok, Thailand	Singapore	9–0	16–0	2003 AFC Women's Championship
4.	20 April 2004	Hiroshima, Japan	Hong Kong	2–0	9–0	2004 Summer Olympics qualification
5.	20 April 2004	Hiroshima, Japan	Hong Kong	7–0	9–0	2004 Summer Olympics qualification
6.	18 June 2006	Adelaide, Australia	Thailand	5–0	9–0	2006 AFC Women's Asian Cup
7.	4 December 2006	Al-Rayyan, Qatar	Chinese Taipei	4–0	4–0	2006 Asian Games

== See also ==
- North Korea at the 2008 Summer Olympics
