= Wang Dandan =

Chinese footballer

Medal record

Women's football

Representing China

Asian Games
Bronze medal – third place	2006 Doha	Team

Wang Dandan (born May 1, 1985, in Beijing) is a Chinese football player who competed for the national team in the 2008 Summer Olympics. Her position is midfielder.

== Major performances ==
- 2005 National Games - 1st
- 2006 Asian Youth Championship - 2nd
- 2006/2008 Asian Cup - 1st/2nd

== International goals ==
No.	Date	Venue	Opponent	Score	Result	Competition
1.	30 November 2006	Grand Hamad Stadium, Doha, Qatar	Thailand	1–0	7–0	2006 Asian Games
2.	10 December 2006	Suheim bin Hamad Stadium, Doha, Qatar	North Korea	1–0	1–3 (a.e.t.)	2006 Asian Games
3.	5 June 2008	Thống Nhất Stadium, Hồ Chí Minh City, Vietnam	Japan	1–1	3–1	2008 AFC Women's Asian Cup
4.	5 June 2008	Thống Nhất Stadium, Hồ Chí Minh City, Vietnam	Japan	2–1	3–1	2008 AFC Women's Asian Cup
5.	12 January 2009	Yuexiushan Stadium, Guangzhou, China	Finland	1–0	1–0	2009 Four Nations Tournament
