= O Kum-ran =

North Korean footballer

Personal information
- Date of birth: 18 September 1981 (age 45)
- Position: Midfielder

International career^{‡}
Years	Team	Apps	(Gls)
	North Korea	3	(0)
- ‡ National team caps and goals as of 29 September 2003

O Kum-ran (born 18 September 1981,Korean: 오금란) is a North Korean women's international footballer who plays as a midfielder. She is a member of the North Korea women's national football team. She was part of the team at the 2003 FIFA Women's World Cup.

== International goals ==
Scores and results list North Korea's goal tally first.

No.	Date	Venue	Opponent	Score	Result	Competition
1.	14 June 2003	Bangkok, Thailand	Singapore	16–0	16–0	2003 AFC Women's Championship
2.	22 April 2004	Hiroshima, Japan	Singapore	5–0	8–0	2004 Summer Olympics
3.	26 April 2004	Hiroshima, Japan	South Korea	5–1	5–1	2004 Summer Olympics
