= Kil Son-hui =

North Korean footballer (born 1986)

Personal information
- Date of birth: 7 March 1986 (age 40)
- Place of birth: North Korea
- Position: Forward

Senior career*
Years	Team	Apps	(Gls)
2008	Rimyongsu		

International career
2007–2008	North Korea	50 (?)	(20)
- * Club domestic league appearances and goals

- Kil Son-hui
- Hangul: 길선희
- RR: Gil Seonhui
- MR: Kil Sŏnhŭi

Kil Son-hui (Korean: 길선희; born 7 March 1986) is a North Korean football forward who played for the North Korea women's national football team. She competed at the 2007 FIFA Women's World Cup and 2008 Summer Olympics. At the club level, she played for Rimyongsu.

== International goals ==
No.	Date	Venue	Opponent	Score	Result	Competition
1.	30 November 2006	Doha, Qatar	Vietnam	1–0	5–0	2006 Asian Games
2.	30 November 2006	Doha, Qatar	Vietnam	5–0	5–0	2006 Asian Games
3.	10 December 2006	Doha, Qatar	China	1–1	3–1 (a.e.t.)	2006 Asian Games
4.	11 September 2007	Chengdu, China	United States	1–1	2–2	2007 FIFA Women's World Cup

== See also ==
- North Korea at the 2008 Summer Olympics
