= Ri Un-gyong =

North Korean footballer

Personal information
- Date of birth: 19 November 1980 (age 45)
- Place of birth: North Korea
- Position: Midfielder

Senior career*
Years	Team	Apps	(Gls)
2008	Wolmido		

International career
2008	North Korea	81 (?)	(35)
- * Club domestic league appearances and goals

- Ri Un-gyong
- Hangul: 리은경
- RR: Ri Eungyeong
- MR: Ri Ŭn'gyŏng

Ri Un-gyong (born 19 November 1980) is a North Korean former football midfielder who played for the North Korea women's national football team at the 2008 Summer Olympics. At the club level, she played for Wolmido.

== International goals ==
No.	Date	Venue	Opponent	Score	Result	Competition
1.	10 June 2003	Bangkok, Thailand	Hong Kong	5–0	13–0	2003 AFC Women's Championship
2.	10 June 2003	Bangkok, Thailand	Hong Kong	13–0	13–0	2003 AFC Women's Championship
3.	12 June 2003	Bangkok, Thailand	Thailand	2–0	14–0	2003 AFC Women's Championship
4.	20 September 2003	Philadelphia, United States	Nigeria	2–0	3–0	2003 FIFA Women's World Cup
5.	24 February 2004	Brisbane, Australia	New Zealand	10–0	11–0	2004 Australia Cup
6.	22 April 2004	Hiroshima, Japan	Singapore	7–0	8–0	2004 Summer Olympics qualification
7.	22 April 2004	Hiroshima, Japan	Singapore	8–0	8–0	2004 Summer Olympics qualification
8.	20 July 2006	Adelaide, Australia	Myanmar	3–0	3–0	2006 AFC Women's Asian Cup
9.	30 July 2006	Adelaide, Australia	Japan	2–0	3–2	2006 AFC Women's Asian Cup
10.	30 July 2006	Adelaide, Australia	Japan	3–0	3–2	2006 AFC Women's Asian Cup
11.	30 November 2006	Doha, Qatar	Vietnam	2–0	5–0	2006 Asian Games
12.	7 December 2006	Al-Rayyan, Qatar	South Korea	4–1	4–1	2006 Asian Games
13.	10 December 2006	Doha, Qatar	China	3–1	3–1 (a.e.t.)	2006 Asian Games
14.	18 February 2008	Chongqing, China	Japan	2–1	2–3	2008 EAFF Women's Football Championship
15.	30 May 2008	Ho Chi Minh City, Vietnam	Vietnam	1–0	3–0	2008 AFC Women's Asian Cup
16.	1 July 2008	Ho Chi Minh City, Vietnam	China	1–0	1–0	2008 AFC Women's Asian Cup

== See also ==
- North Korea at the 2008 Summer Olympics
