= Football at the 2008 Summer Olympics – Women's tournament =

2008 Women's Olympic Football Tournament

Tournament details
- Host country: China
- Dates: 6–21 August
- Teams: 12 (from 6 confederations)
- Venue: 5 (in 5 host cities)

Final positions
- Champions: United States (3rd title)
- Runners-up: Brazil
- Third place: Germany
- Fourth place: Japan

Tournament statistics
- Matches played: 26
- Goals scored: 66 (2.54 per match)
- Attendance: 740,014 (28,462 per match)
- Top scorer: (Brazil) Cristiane (5 goals)
- Fair play award: China

The women's association football tournament at the 2008 Summer Olympics was held in Beijing and four other cities in the People's Republic of China from 6 to 21 August. Associations affiliated with FIFA were invited to send their full women's national teams.

For these Games, the women competed in a 12-team tournament. Preliminary matches commenced on 6 August, two days before the Opening Ceremony of the Games. The teams were grouped into three pools of four teams each for a round-robin preliminary round. The top two teams in each pool, as well as the best two third-place finishing teams, advanced to an eight-team single-elimination bracket.

The tournament was won by the United States, which beat Brazil 1–0 in the gold medal game. Carli Lloyd scored the game-winning goal in the 96th minute for the United States, which collected their third Olympic gold medal.

== Qualifying ==
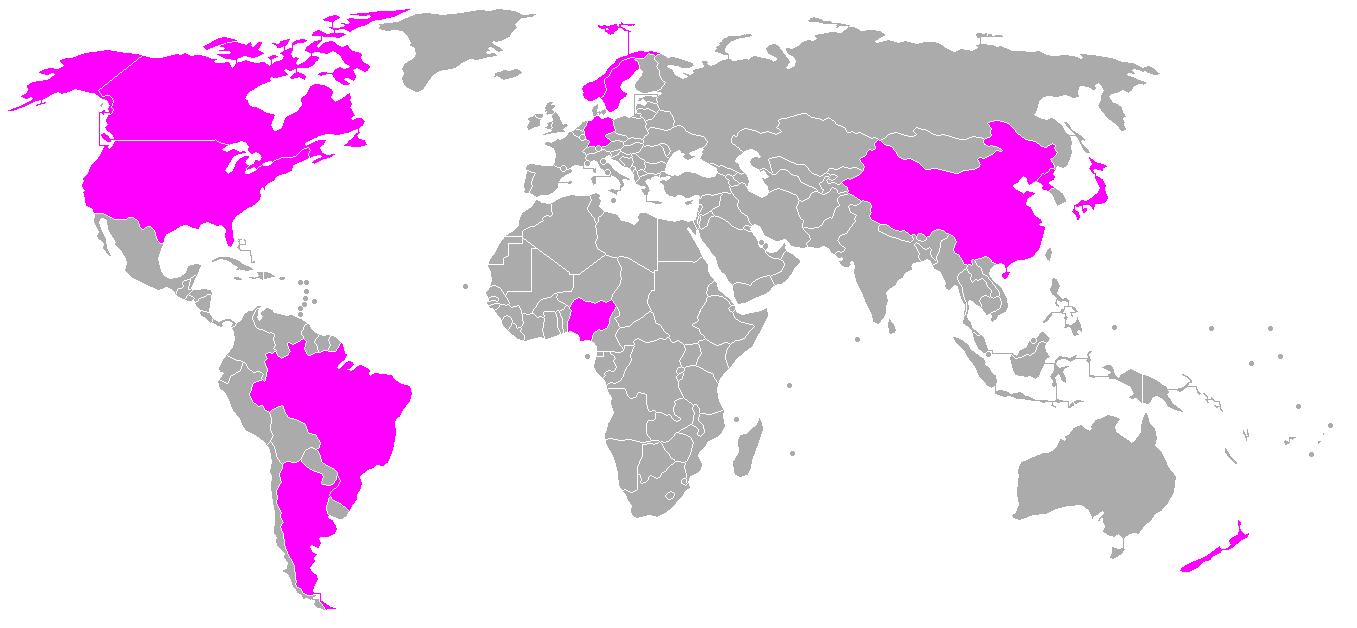
Countries of women's tournament

A National Olympic Committee may enter one women's team for the football competition.

Means of completion	Date of completion	Venue	Berths	Qualified
Host nation	–	–	1	China
AFC Preliminary Competition	February 2007 – August 2007	–	2	Japan; North Korea
CAF Preliminary Competition	October 2006 – March 2008	–	1	Nigeria
CONCACAF Preliminary Competition	October 2007 – April 2008	(Mexico) Ciudad Juárez	2	United States; Canada
2006 Sudamericano Femenino	10–26 November 2006	(Argentina) Mar del Plata	1	Argentina
OFC Women's Olympic Qualifying	25 August – 7 September 2007; 8 March 2008	(Samoa) Apia (Papua New Guinea) Port Moresby	1	New Zealand
UEFA (2007 FIFA Women's World Cup)*	10–30 September 2007	China	2*	Germany; Norway
UEFA Playoff (Denmark vs Sweden)	8 November 2007; 28 November 2007	(Denmark) Viborg (Sweden) Solna	1*	Sweden
CONMEBOL–CAF play-off	19 April 2008	(China) Beijing	1	Brazil
TOTAL			12	

- Note – The three best ranked European teams at the FIFA Women's World Cup qualified for the Olympics. However, the third best team England could not participate, because England competes at the Olympic Games as part of Great Britain, which does not compete in football. Therefore, the fourth European team would advance, requiring a play-off between Sweden and Denmark.

== Venues ==
The tournament was held in five venues across five cities:

Beijing	Shanghai	Tianjin	Location of the host cities of the women's football tournament of the 2008 Summer Olympics.
Workers' Stadium	Shanghai Stadium	Tianjin Olympic Centre Stadium	Location of the host cities of the women's football tournament of the 2008 Summer Olympics.
Capacity: 70,161	Capacity: 80,000	Capacity: 60,000	Location of the host cities of the women's football tournament of the 2008 Summer Olympics.
Shenyang	Qinhuangdao		Location of the host cities of the women's football tournament of the 2008 Summer Olympics.
Shenyang Olympic Stadium	Qinhuangdao Olympic Sports Centre Stadium		Location of the host cities of the women's football tournament of the 2008 Summer Olympics.
Capacity: 60,000	Capacity: 33,000		Location of the host cities of the women's football tournament of the 2008 Summer Olympics.

== Seeding ==
Pot 1: Asia	Pot 2: North America and Africa	Pot 3: Europe	Pot 4: South America and Oceania
China (Hosts); Japan; North Korea	Canada; Nigeria; United States	Germany; Norway; Sweden	Argentina; Brazil; New Zealand

== Squads ==
The women's tournament is a full international tournament with no restrictions on age. Each nation must submit a squad of 18 players by 23 July 2008. A minimum of two goalkeepers (plus one optional alternate goalkeeper) must be included in the squad.

== Match officials ==
Referees
Confederation	Referee
AFC	Hong Eun-ah (South Korea)
AFC	Pannipar Kamnueng (Thailand)
AFC	Niu Huijun (China PR)
CAF	Deidre Mitchell (South Africa)
CONCACAF	Shane de Silva (Trinidad and Tobago)
CONCACAF	Dianne Ferreira-James (Guyana)
CONCACAF	Kari Seitz (United States)
CONMEBOL	Estela Álvarez (Argentina)
UEFA	Christine Beck (Germany)
UEFA	Dagmar Damková (Czech Republic)
UEFA	Jenny Palmqvist (Sweden)
UEFA	Nicole Petignat (Switzerland)

Assistant referees
Confederation	Assistant referee
AFC	Daw Kaw Ja (Myanmar)
AFC	Sarah Ho (Australia)
AFC	Jacqueline Leleu (Australia)
AFC	Liu Hongjuan (China PR)
AFC	Liu Hsiu-mei (Chinese Taipei)
AFC	Widiya Habibah Shamsuri (Malaysia)
CAF	Nomvula Masilela (South Africa)
CAF	Tempa Ndah (Benin)
CONCACAF	Mayte Chávez (Mexico)
CONCACAF	Marlene Duffy (United States)
CONCACAF	Milena López (Costa Rica)
CONCACAF	Cindy Mohammed (Trinidad and Tobago)
CONCACAF	Rita Muñoz (Mexico)
CONCACAF	Veronica Perez (United States)
CONMEBOL	Marlene Leyton (Peru)
CONMEBOL	María Rocco (Argentina)
UEFA	Helen Caro (Sweden)
UEFA	Cristina Cini (Italy)
UEFA	Irina Mirt (Romania)
UEFA	Inka Müller (Germany)
UEFA	Katarzyna Nadolska (Poland)
UEFA	Hege Lanes Steinlund (Norway)
UEFA	María Luisa Villa Gutiérrez (Spain)
UEFA	Karine Vives Solana (France)

== Group stage ==
Group winners and runners-up, plus two best third place teams advanced to quarter final round. Groups are lettered sequentially from the last letter in the Men's Football tournament (which has Groups A through D).

All times are China Standard Time (UTC+8)

=== Group E ===
Pos	Team	Pld	W	D	L	GF	GA	GD	Pts	Qualification
1	China	3	2	1	0	5	2	+3	7	Qualified for the quarterfinals
2	Sweden	3	2	0	1	4	3	+1	6	Qualified for the quarterfinals
3	Canada	3	1	1	1	4	4	0	4	Qualified for the quarterfinals
4	Argentina	3	0	0	3	1	5	−4	0	

6 August 2008
17:00

Argentina	1–2	Canada
Manicler 85'	Report	Chapman 27'; Lang 72'

Tianjin Olympic Center Stadium, Tianjin
Attendance: 23,201
Referee: Christine Beck (Germany)

6 August 2008
19:45

China	2–1	Sweden
Xu Yuan 6'; Han Duan 72'	Report	Schelin 38'

Tianjin Olympic Center Stadium, Tianjin
Attendance: 37,902
Referee: Hong Eun-ah (Korea Republic)

9 August 2008
17:00

Sweden	1–0	Argentina
Fischer 57'	Report

Tianjin Olympic Center Stadium, Tianjin
Attendance: 38,293
Referee: Dianne Ferreira-James (Guyana)

9 August 2008
19:45

Canada	1–1	China
Sinclair 34'	Report	Xu Yuan 36'

Tianjin Olympic Center Stadium, Tianjin
Attendance: 52,600
Referee: Dagmar Damková (Czech Republic)

12 August 2008
19:45

China	2–0	Argentina
Quiñones 52' (o.g.); Gu Yasha 90'	Report

Qinhuangdao Olympic Sports Center Stadium, Qinhuangdao
Attendance: 31,492
Referee: Nicole Petignat (Switzerland)

12 August 2008
19:45

Sweden	2–1	Canada
Schelin 19', 51'	Report	Tancredi 63'

Beijing Workers' Stadium, Beijing
Attendance: 51,112
Referee: Pannipar Kamnueng (Thailand)

=== Group F ===
Pos	Team	Pld	W	D	L	GF	GA	GD	Pts	Qualification
1	Brazil	3	2	1	0	5	2	+3	7	Qualified for the quarterfinals
2	Germany	3	2	1	0	2	0	+2	7	Qualified for the quarterfinals
3	North Korea	3	1	0	2	2	3	−1	3	
4	Nigeria	3	0	0	3	1	5	−4	0	

6 August 2008
17:00

Germany	0–0	Brazil
	Report

Shenyang Olympic Stadium, Shenyang
Attendance: 20,703
Referee: Kari Seitz (USA)

6 August 2008
19:45

North Korea	1–0	Nigeria
Kim Kyong-hwa 27'	Report

Shenyang Olympic Stadium, Shenyang
Attendance: 24,084
Referee: Shane de Silva (Trinidad and Tobago)

9 August 2008
17:00

Nigeria	0–1	Germany
	Report	Stegemann 65'

Shenyang Olympic Stadium, Shenyang
Attendance: 19,266
Referee: Jenny Palmqvist (Sweden)

9 August 2008
19:45

Brazil	2–1	North Korea
Daniela 14'; Marta 23'	Report	Ri Kum-suk 90'

Shenyang Olympic Stadium, Shenyang
Attendance: 19,616
Referee: Niu Huijun (China)

12 August 2008
17:00

North Korea	0–1	Germany
	Report	Mittag 86'

Tianjin Olympic Center Stadium, Tianjin
Attendance: 12,387
Referee: Dianne Ferreira-James (Guyana)

12 August 2008
17:00

Nigeria	1–3	Brazil
Nkwocha 19' (pen.)	Report	Cristiane 34', 35', 45+3'

Beijing Workers' Stadium, Beijing
Attendance: 51,112
Referee: Hong Eun-ah (Korea Republic)

=== Group G ===
Pos	Team	Pld	W	D	L	GF	GA	GD	Pts	Qualification
1	United States	3	2	0	1	5	2	+3	6	Qualified for the quarterfinals
2	Norway	3	2	0	1	4	5	−1	6	Qualified for the quarterfinals
3	Japan	3	1	1	1	7	4	+3	4	Qualified for the quarterfinals
4	New Zealand	3	0	1	2	2	7	−5	1	

6 August 2008
17:00

Japan	2–2	New Zealand
Miyama 72' (pen.); Sawa 86'	Report	Yallop 37'; Hearn 56' (pen.)

Qinhuangdao Olympic Sports Center Stadium, Qinhuangdao
Attendance: 10,270
Referee: Deidre Mitchell (South Africa)

6 August 2008
19:45

Norway	2–0	United States
Larsen Kaurin 2'; Wiik 4'	Report

Qinhuangdao Olympic Sports Center Stadium, Qinhuangdao
Attendance: 17,673
Referee: Nicole Petignat (Switzerland)

9 August 2008
17:00

United States	1–0	Japan
Lloyd 27'	Report

Qinhuangdao Olympic Sports Center Stadium, Qinhuangdao
Attendance: 16,912
Referee: Pannipar Kamnueng (Thailand)

9 August 2008
19:45

New Zealand	0–1	Norway
	Report	Wiik 8'

Qinhuangdao Olympic Sports Center Stadium, Qinhuangdao
Attendance: 7,285
Referee: Estela Álvarez (Argentina)

12 August 2008
19:45

Norway	1–5	Japan
Knutsen 27'	Report	Kinga 31'; Følstad 51' (o.g.); Ohno 52'; Sawa 71'; Hara 83'

Shanghai Stadium, Shanghai
Attendance: 16,872
Referee: Shane de Silva (Trinidad and Tobago)

12 August 2008
19:45

United States	4–0	New Zealand
O'Reilly 1'; Rodriguez 43'; Tarpley 56'; Hucles 60'	Report

Shenyang Olympic Stadium, Shenyang
Attendance: 12,453
Referee: Dagmar Damkova (Czech Republic)

=== Ranking of third-placed teams ===
Team	Pld	W	D	L	GF	GA	GD	Pts
Japan	3	1	1	1	7	4	+3	4
Canada	3	1	1	1	4	4	0	4
North Korea	3	1	0	2	2	3	−1	3

== Knockout stage ==
Quarterfinals
F1	Brazil	2
G2	Norway	1
E2	Sweden	0
F2	Germany (a.e.t.)	2
E1	China	0
G3	Japan	2
G1	United States (a.e.t.)	2
E3	Canada	1

Semifinals
F1	Brazil	4
F2	Germany	1
G3	Japan	2
G1	United States	4

Gold medal match
F1	Brazil	0
G1	United States (a.e.t.)	1
Bronze medal match
F2	Germany	2
G3	Japan	0

=== Quarter-finals ===
15 August 2008
18:00

United States	2–1 (a.e.t.)	Canada
Hucles 12'; Kai 101'	Report	Sinclair 30'

Shanghai Stadium, Shanghai
Attendance: 26,129
Referee: Jenny Palmqvist (Sweden)

15 August 2008
18:00

Brazil	2–1	Norway
Daniela 43'; Marta 57'	Report	S. Nordby 83' (pen.)

Tianjin Olympic Center Stadium, Tianjin
Attendance: 26,174
Referee: Kari Seitz (USA)

15 August 2008
21:00

Sweden	0–2 (a.e.t.)	Germany
	Report	Garefrekes 104'; Laudehr 115'

Shenyang Olympic Stadium, Shenyang
Attendance: 17,209
Referee: Dagmar Damkova (Czech Republic)

15 August 2008
21:00

China	0–2	Japan
	Report	Sawa 15'; Nagasato 80'

Qinhuangdao Olympic Sports Center Stadium, Qinhuangdao
Attendance: 28,459
Referee: Christine Beck (Germany)

=== Semi-finals ===
18 August 2008
18:00

Brazil	4–1	Germany
Formiga 43'; Cristiane 49', 76'; Marta 53'	Report	Prinz 10'

Shanghai Stadium, Shanghai
Attendance: 26,976
Referee: Hong Eun-ah (Korea Republic)

18 August 2008
21:00

Japan	2–4	United States
Ohno 16'; Arakawa 90+3'	Report	Hucles 41', 80'; Chalupny 44'; O'Reilly 70'

Beijing Workers' Stadium, Beijing
Attendance: 50,937
Referee: Nicole Petignat (Switzerland)

=== Bronze medal match ===
21 August 2008
18:00

(bronze) Germany	2–0	Japan
Bajramaj 68', 87'	Report

Beijing Workers' Stadium, Beijing
Attendance: 49,285
Referee: Estela Álvarez (Argentina)

=== Gold medal match ===
21 August 2008
21:00

(silver) Brazil	0–1 (a.e.t.)	United States (gold)
	Report	Lloyd 96'

Beijing Workers' Stadium, Beijing
Attendance: 51,612
Referee: Dagmar Damkova (Czech Republic)

== Statistics ==
=== Goalscorers ===
There were 66 goals scored in 26 matches, for an average of 2.54 goals per match.

5 goals

- (Brazil) Cristiane

4 goals

- (United States) Angela Hucles

3 goals

- (Brazil) Marta
- (Japan) Homare Sawa
- (Sweden) Lotta Schelin

2 goals

- (Brazil) Daniela
- (Canada) Christine Sinclair
- (China) Xu Yuan
- (Germany) Fatmire Bajramaj
- (Japan) Shinobu Ohno
- (Norway) Melissa Wiik
- (United States) Carli Lloyd
- (United States) Heather O'Reilly

1 goal

- (Argentina) Ludmila Manicler
- (Brazil) Formiga
- (Canada) Candace Chapman
- (Canada) Kara Lang
- (Canada) Melissa Tancredi
- (China) Gu Yasha
- (China) Han Duan
- (Germany) Kerstin Garefrekes
- (Germany) Simone Laudehr
- (Germany) Anja Mittag
- (Germany) Birgit Prinz
- (Germany) Kerstin Stegemann
- (Japan) Eriko Arakawa
- (Japan) Ayumi Hara
- (Japan) Yukari Kinga
- (Japan) Aya Miyama
- (Japan) Yūki Nagasato
- (New Zealand) Amber Hearn
- (New Zealand) Kirsty Yallop
- (Nigeria) Perpetua Nkwocha
- (North Korea) Kim Kyong-hwa
- (North Korea) Ri Kum-suk
- (Norway) Guro Knutsen
- (Norway) Leni Larsen Kaurin
- (Norway) Siri Nordby
- (Sweden) Nilla Fischer
- (United States) Lori Chalupny
- (United States) Natasha Kai
- (United States) Amy Rodriguez
- (United States) Lindsay Tarpley

1 own goal

- (Argentina) Florencia Quiñones (against China PR)
- (Norway) Gunhild Følstad (against Japan)

Source: FIFA

=== Assists ===
3 assists

- (Japan) Aya Miyama

2 assists

- (Brazil) Cristiane
- (China) Xu Yuan
- (Japan) Shinobu Ohno
- (Sweden) Victoria Sandell Svensson
- (United States) Heather O'Reilly

1 assist

- (Argentina) Mariela Coronel
- (Brazil) Marta
- (Brazil) Maycon
- (Brazil) Rosana
- (Canada) Kara Lang
- (Canada) Clare Rustad
- (Canada) Rhian Wilkinson
- (China) Bi Yan
- (China) Zhang Na
- (Germany) Renate Lingor
- (Germany) Anja Mittag
- (Germany) Birgit Prinz
- (Japan) Yukari Kinga
- (Japan) Yūki Nagasato
- (New Zealand) Ali Riley
- (North Korea) Ri Un-gyong
- (Norway) Gunhild Følstad
- (Norway) Leni Larsen Kaurin
- (Norway) Ane Stangeland Horpestad
- (Sweden) Jessica Landström
- (Sweden) Therese Sjögran
- (United States) Shannon Boxx
- (United States) Rachel Buehler
- (United States) Lindsay Tarpley

Source: FIFA

=== FIFA Fair Play Award ===
China PR won the FIFA Fair Play Award, given to the team with the best record of fair play during the tournament. Every match in the final competition is taken into account but only teams that reach the second stage of the competition are eligible for the Fair Play Award.

Pos	Team	Pts
1	China	956
2	Japan	939
3	United States	930
4	Germany	913
5	Sweden	913
6	Norway	903
7	Brazil	896
8	Canada	892

=== Tournament ranking ===
Per statistical convention in football, matches decided in extra time are counted as wins and losses, while matches decided by penalty shoot-outs are counted as draws.

Pos	Grp	Team	Pld	W	D	L	GF	GA	GD	Pts	Final result
1	G	United States	6	5	0	1	12	5	+7	15	Gold medal
2	F	Brazil	6	4	1	1	11	5	+6	13	Silver medal
3	F	Germany	6	4	1	1	7	4	+3	13	Bronze medal
4	G	Japan	6	2	1	3	11	10	+1	7	Fourth place
5	E	China (H)	4	2	1	1	5	4	+1	7	Eliminated in quarter-finals
6	E	Sweden	4	2	0	2	4	5	−1	6	Eliminated in quarter-finals
7	G	Norway	4	2	0	2	5	7	−2	6	Eliminated in quarter-finals
8	E	Canada	4	1	1	2	5	6	−1	4	Eliminated in quarter-finals
9	F	North Korea	3	1	0	2	2	3	−1	3	Eliminated in group stage
10	G	New Zealand	3	0	1	2	2	7	−5	1	Eliminated in group stage
11	E	Argentina	3	0	0	3	1	5	−4	0	Eliminated in group stage
11	F	Nigeria	3	0	0	3	1	5	−4	0	Eliminated in group stage

Source: FIFA
(H) Hosts
