= Kim Kum-sil =

North Korean footballer and politician (born 1970)

Personal information
- Date of birth: 24 December 1970 (age 55)
- Position: Midfielder

International career^{‡}
Years	Team	Apps	(Gls)
	North Korea	3	(1)
- ‡ National team caps and goals as of 29 June 1999 (before the 1999 FIFA Women's World Cup)

Kim Kum-sil (Korean: 김금실; born 24 December 1970) is a North Korean politician and former women's international footballer; she played as a midfielder. She was a member of the North Korea women's national football team. She was part of the team at the 1999 FIFA Women's World Cup. She holds the title of Merited Athlete.

Kim is a member of parliament in North Korea's Supreme People's Assembly (SPA). She was elected to the SPA from the 233th Electoral District in the 2009 North Korean parliamentary election and from the 278th (Nyongbyon) in 2014 and 2019.
