= Kim Kyong-hwa =

North Korean footballer (born 1986)

- Born: March 28, 1986 (age 39); Sinpho, North Korea
- Occupation: Football player

Korean name
- Hangul: 김경화
- RR: Gim Gyeonghwa
- MR: Kim Kyŏnghwa

Kim Kyong-hwa (Korean: 김경화; pronounced [kim.ɡjʌŋ.ɦwa]; born March 28, 1986) is a North Korean football (soccer) player who can play as either midfielder or forward. Her club team is 4.25 Sports Team and she is an established international player.

== History ==
Kim was born in Sinpho and began playing football at age 10. She made her international debut in 2003 at the Summer Universiade.

She later represented North Korea in multiple international competitions, including the Asian Games, AFC Women’s Asian Cup, Summer Olympics, and FIFA Women’s World Cup. At the 2006 Asian Games, North Korea won the gold medal. She also competed in the 2007 FIFA Women’s World Cup and the 2008 Summer Olympics qualification tournament.

Kim participated in the 2010 AFC Women’s Asian Cup, where North Korea won the championship. She also appeared in matches during the 2010 Summer Olympics qualification campaign.

== International goals ==
No.	Date	Venue	Opponent	Score	Result	Competition
1.	30 November 2006	Doha, Qatar	Vietnam	3–0	5–0	2006 Asian Games
2.	4 December 2006	Al-Rayyan, Qatar	Chinese Taipei	1–0	4–0	2006 Asian Games
3.	4 December 2006	Al-Rayyan, Qatar	Chinese Taipei	3–0	4–0	2006 Asian Games
4.	7 December 2006	Al-Rayyan, Qatar	South Korea	2–0	4–1	2006 Asian Games
5.	10 June 2007	Coffs Harbour, Australia	Australia	2–0	2–0	2008 Summer Olympics qualification
6.	14 September 2007	Chengdu, China	Nigeria	1–0	2–0	2007 FIFA Women's World Cup
7.	28 May 2008	Ho Chi Minh City, Vietnam	Thailand	1–0	5–0	2008 AFC Women's Asian Cup
8.	28 May 2008	Ho Chi Minh City, Vietnam	Thailand	3–0	5–0	2008 AFC Women's Asian Cup
9.	6 August 2008	Shenyang, China	Nigeria	1–0	1–0	2008 Summer Olympics
10.	27 May 2010	Chengdu, China	China	1–0	1–0 (a.e.t.)	2010 AFC Women's Asian Cup
