= Hong Eun-ah =

South Korean football referee (born 1980)

- Full name: Hong Eun-ah
- Born: 9 January 1980 (age 46); South Korea

International
- Years: League
- 2003−2012: FIFA

Hong Eun-ah (Korean: 홍은아; born 9 January 1980) is a former South Korean football referee.

She has refereed several major women's football matches at domestic and international level. These include matches at the 2008 and 2012 Women's Olympic Football Tournaments. Hong is 5 ft 7 in (1.70 m) tall.

Hong studied at Loughborough University and while staying in England, was asked to referee the 2010 FA Women's Cup final. She was known as Una Hong in the UK.

In November 2009 Hong was named Asian Football Confederation (AFC) female referee of the year.
