= Jin Pyol-hui =

North Korean footballer (born 1980)

Personal information
- Date of birth: 19 August 1980 (age 46)
- Position: Forward

International career^{‡}
Years	Team	Apps	(Gls)
	North Korea	6	(3)
- ‡ National team caps and goals as of 29 September 2003

Jin Pyol-hui (born 19 August 1980,Korean: 진별희) is a North Korean former women's international footballer who played as a forward. She was a member of the North Korea women's national football team. She was part of the team at the 1999 FIFA Women's World Cup and 2003 FIFA Women's World Cup.

== International goals ==
No.	Date	Venue	Opponent	Score	Result	Competition
1.	24 June 1999	Portland, United States	Denmark	1–0	3–1	1999 FIFA Women's World Cup
2.	2 October 2002	Busan, South Korea	Japan	1–0	1–0	2002 Asian Games
3.	9 October 2002	Busan, South Korea	South Korea	2–0	2–0	2002 Asian Games
4.	11 October 2002	Changwon, South Korea	Vietnam	1–0	4–0	2002 Asian Games
5.	11 October 2002	Changwon, South Korea	Vietnam	2–0	4–0	2002 Asian Games
6.	10 June 2003	Bangkok, Thailand	Hong Kong	12–0	13–0	2003 AFC Women's Championship
7.	12 June 2003	Bangkok, Thailand	Thailand	1–0	14–0	2003 AFC Women's Championship
8.	12 June 2003	Bangkok, Thailand	Thailand	3–0	14–0	2003 AFC Women's Championship
9.	12 June 2003	Bangkok, Thailand	Thailand	6–0	14–0	2003 AFC Women's Championship
10.	12 June 2003	Bangkok, Thailand	Thailand	8–0	14–0	2003 AFC Women's Championship
11.	14 June 2003	Bangkok, Thailand	Singapore	1–0	16–0	2003 AFC Women's Championship
12.	14 June 2003	Bangkok, Thailand	Singapore	4–0	16–0	2003 AFC Women's Championship
13.	14 June 2003	Bangkok, Thailand	Singapore	6–0	16–0	2003 AFC Women's Championship
14.	16 June 2003	Bangkok, Thailand	South Korea	2–2	2–2	2003 AFC Women's Championship
15.	20 September 2003	Philadelphia, United States	Nigeria	1–0	3–0	2003 FIFA Women's World Cup
16.	20 September 2003	Philadelphia, United States	Nigeria	3–0	3–0	2003 FIFA Women's World Cup
17.	18 February 2004	Brisbane, Australia	China	2–0	3–0	2004 Australia Cup
18.	24 February 2004	Brisbane, Australia	New Zealand	5–0	11–0	2004 Australia Cup
19.	24 February 2004	Brisbane, Australia	New Zealand	7–0	11–0	2004 Australia Cup
20.	24 February 2004	Brisbane, Australia	New Zealand	11–0	11–0	2004 Australia Cup
21.	18 April 2004	Hiroshima, Japan	Chinese Taipei	5–0	5–0	2004 Summer Olympics qualification
22.	20 April 2004	Hiroshima, Japan	Hong Kong	3–0	9–0	2004 Summer Olympics qualification
23.	22 April 2004	Hiroshima, Japan	Singapore	1–0	8–0	2004 Summer Olympics qualification
