= Niu Huijun =

Chinese football referee (born 1969)

- Full name: Niu Huijun
- Born: 13 January 1969 (age 57); China
- Other occupation: Teacher

Domestic
Years	League	Role

International
Years	League	Role
2004–	FIFA-listed	Referee

Niu Huijun (Chinese: 牛惠君; pinyin: Niú Huìjūn; Mandarin pronunciation: [njǒʊ xwêɪ tɕýn]; born January 13, 1969) is a Chinese football referee.

A teacher by profession, she refereed her first international match in 2004 before going on to officiate at the 2005 Southeast Asian games and the 2006 Asian Games.

Niu was selected as one of the officials for the 2007 FIFA Women's World Cup in China and refereed two games - Nigeria v Sweden and Australia v Norway.
