= Pannipar Kamnueng =

Thai former football referee (born 1976)

- Full name: Pannipar Kamnueng
- Born: 22 January 1976 (age 50); Singburi, Thailand

International
Years	League	Role
2004–2015	FIFA listed	Referee

Pannipar Kamnueng (Thai: พัณณิภา คำนึง, born January 22, 1976) is a Thai former football referee.

She first refereed internationally at the 2004 FIFA U-19 Women's World Championship before going on to officiate at the 2005 East Asian Cup.

Kamnueng was chosen for the 2007 FIFA Women's World Cup in China and refereed Brazil's 5–0 win against New Zealand.

== Early life ==
Kamnueng graduated with a bachelor's degree from the Faculty of Education, Physical Education, Kasetsart University. She was a national hockey player once in her life, which was the 20th SEA Games in 1999 and received a bronze medal.
