= India women's national football team results (2000–2009) =

This article shows the results of India women's national football team from 2000 to 2009.

Legend Win

Draw

Loss

Only Senior A international matches are listed here.

== 2001 ==
4 December AFC Women C	India	0–7	South Korea	Taipei, Taiwan
			Yoo Young-sil; Lee Myung-hwa; Koak Mi-Hi; Kong Sun-Mi; Cha Sung-Mi	Stadium: Chungshan Soccer Stadium,

6 December AFC Women C	Chinese Taipei	5–0	India	Taipei, Taiwan
	Lee Ming-Shu 12', 61'; Liao Ying-Wan; Huang Chun-Lan; Lin Chi-I 85'	Report		Stadium: Chungshan Soccer Stadium,

10 December AFC Women C	India	0–1	Thailand	Taipei, Taiwan
		RSSSF

12 December AFC Women C	India	3–0	Malaysia	Taipei, Taiwan
	Sujata Kar 21', 22'; Shadokpam Shanti Devi 27'	Report		Stadium: Taipei Municipality Stadium

== 2003 ==
9 June AFC Women C	India	6–0	Uzbekistan	Nakhon Sawan, Thailand
18:15	Shadokpam Rani Chanu 15'; Khundrakpam Maichon Devi 20'; Robita Wangkhem Devi 40'; Sujata Kar 47'; Tababi Devi 72', 76'			Stadium: Nakhon Sawan Province Stadium; Attendance: 1000; Referee: Ri Hong Sil (North Korea)

11 June AFC Women C	China	12–0	India	Nakhon Sawan, Thailand
18:15	Bai Jie 9', 20', 26', 74', 79'; Sun Wen 22', 63', 67', 88', 90+1'; Zhao Lihong 56'; Liu Ying 61'			Stadium: Nakhon Sawan Province Stadium; Attendance: 800; Referee: Mayumi Oiwa (Japan)

13 June AFC Women C	Vietnam	2–1	India	Nakhon Sawan, Thailand
16:00	Lưu Ngọc Mai 9'; Đoàn Kim 55'		Sujata Kar 60'	Stadium: Nakhon Sawan Province Stadium; Attendance: 1000; Referee: Im Eun Ju (South Korea)

== 2005 ==
12 June 2006 AFCW Q	India	10–0	Guam	Hanoi, Vietnam
	Sradhanjali Samantaray 23'; Sujata Kar 36', 38', 67', 77', 84'; Pinky Bompal Magar 48'; Tababi Devi 50', 53'; Bembem Devi 58'			Stadium: Mỹ Đình National Stadium

14 June 2006 AFCW Q	India	1–2	Chinese Taipei	Hanoi, Vietnam
	Bembem Devi 36'		Lan Mei-fen 19'; Lin Yu-hui 46'	Stadium: Mỹ Đình National Stadium

20 June 2006 AFCW Q	India	2–3	Thailand	Hanoi, Vietnam
	Sujata Kar 11', 17'		Wiphakonwat Suthonthip 23'; Sukunya Peangthem 72'; Pitasamal Sornsai 83'	Stadium: Mỹ Đình National Stadium

5 October Vietnam Coal Tournament	Chinese Taipei	1–0	India	Cẩm Phả, Vietnam
	? 70'			Stadium: Cẩm Phả Stadium; Attendance: 7000

7 October Vietnam Coal Tournament	Vietnam	2–1	India	Cẩm Phả, Vietnam
	Văn Thị Thanh 3', 70' (pen.)		Bembem Devi 50' (pen.)	Stadium: Cẩm Phả Stadium

== 2007 ==
17 February 2008 Olympics Q	South Korea	5–0	India	Masan, South Korea
	Ji So-yun 47'; Park Hee-young 71', 84'; Yoo Young-a 72'; Kim Jin-young 89'

25 February 2008 Olympics Q	India	0–3	South Korea	Chennai, India
			Lee Kye-Lim 25'; Park Hee-young 38'; Moon Seula 39'	Stadium: Jawaharlal Nehru Stadium; Referee: Niu Huijun (China)

20 October 2008 AFCW Q	India	3–1	Iran	Gurgaon, India
	Bembem Devi 14', 78'; Bala Devi 28'	AFC	Karimi 8'	Stadium: Tau Devi Lal Stadium; Attendance: 5000; Referee: Niu Huijun (China)

27 October 2008 AFCW Q	Iran	4–1	India	Tehran, Iran
	Mahmoudi; Sohila Malmooli Tarazi; Ghanbari	AFC	Bembem Devi	Stadium: Ararat Stadium; Attendance: 200; Referee: Pannipar Kamnueng (Thailand)
