= 2010 EAFF Women's Football Championship =

東アジア女子サッカー選手権2010

Tournament details
- Host country: Japan
- Dates: 22 August – 30 August 2009 (Qualification); 6 February – 13 February 2010 (Final)
- Teams: 7 (from 1 confederation)

Final positions
- Champions: Japan (2nd title)
- Runners-up: China
- Third place: South Korea
- Fourth place: Chinese Taipei

Tournament statistics
- Matches played: 16
- Goals scored: 112 (7 per match)
- Top scorer(s): (China) Han Duan (Japan) Mana Iwabuchi (South Korea) Lee Jang-mi (South Korea) Yoo Young-a
- Best player: (Japan) Homare Sawa

The third edition of the EAFF Women's Football Championship was held in Japan in August 2010. A preliminary qualification tournament was held in Taiwan in late August 2009.

== Rounds ==
| Round | Participants | Host | Date |
|---|---|---|---|
| Semi-final competition | Chinese Taipei, Guam, Hong Kong, Northern Mariana Islands, South Korea | Taiwan | 22–30 August 2009 |
| Final Round | Japan, China, South Korea, Chinese Taipei | Japan | 6–13 February 2010 |

== Semi-final competition ==
The semi-final competition was held in Tainan County (now part of Tainan City), Taiwan from 22–30 August 2009. The winner of the group advanced to the Final Competition.

| Team | Pld | W | D | L | GF | GA | GD | Pts |
|---|---|---|---|---|---|---|---|---|
| South Korea | 4 | 4 | 0 | 0 | 41 | 0 | +41 | 12 |
| Chinese Taipei | 4 | 3 | 0 | 1 | 35 | 7 | +28 | 9 |
| Hong Kong | 4 | 2 | 0 | 2 | 12 | 15 | −3 | 6 |
| Guam | 4 | 1 | 0 | 3 | 5 | 21 | −16 | 3 |
| Northern Mariana Islands | 4 | 0 | 0 | 4 | 1 | 51 | −50 | 0 |

22 August 2009
16:30 UTC+8

| Guam | 5–1 | Northern Mariana Islands |
|---|---|---|
| Thompson 17'; Zimmerman 31'; Quigley 72' (pen.); Shimizu 73', 87' | Report | Knight 39' |

Tainan County Stadium, Tainan County
Attendance: 1,500
Referee: Mariko Iwaki (Japan)
22 August 2009
19:00 UTC+8

| Chinese Taipei | 8–1 | Hong Kong |
|---|---|---|
| Lin Yu-hui 24', 63'; Lin Man-ting 44'; Lin Chiung-ying 53'; Lee Hsueh-hua 66' (pen.); Tseng Shu-o 68'; Chen Hui-shan 74'; Chen Hsiao-chuan 76' | Report | Chan Wing Sze 90' |

Tainan County Stadium, Tainan County
Attendance: 3,000
Referee: Mariko Iwaki (Japan)

24 August 2009
16:30 UTC+8

| Hong Kong | 10–0 | Northern Mariana Islands |
|---|---|---|
| Fung Kam Mui 3', 56', 61', 76'; Ng Wing Kum 13', 34'; Cheung Wai Ki 22', 39'; Chan Wing Sze 42', 47' | Report |

Tainan County Stadium, Tainan County
Attendance: 300
Referee: Youn Bo-kyoung (South Korea)
24 August 2009
19:00 UTC+8

| Guam | 0–9 | South Korea |
|---|---|---|
| | Report | Jeon Ga-eul 5', 9'; Yoo Young-a 8', 63'; Kwon Hah-nul 11', 26', 30'; Kim Soo-yun 29' (pen.); Cho So-hyun 74' |

Tainan County Stadium, Tainan County
Attendance: 300
Referee: Siu Ming Wai (Hong Kong)

26 August 2009
16:30 UTC+8

| Chinese Taipei | 10–0 | Guam |
|---|---|---|
| Tseng Shu-o 5', 30'; Hsieh I-ling 36', 39'; Lin Yu-hui 51'; Tan Wen-lin 66', 74'; Lin Man-ting 69'; Wang Hsiang-huei 70'; Lin Ya-han 82' | Report |

Tainan County Stadium, Tainan County
Attendance: 1,000
Referee: Mariko Iwaki (Japan)
26 August 2009
19:00 UTC+8

| South Korea | 19–0 | Northern Mariana Islands |
|---|---|---|
| Ji So-yun 2', 67', 70' (pen.), 81', 90'; Choi Sun-jin 11'; Lim Seon-joo 20'; Lee Eun-mi 24', 30', 64'; Hong Kyung-suk 41'; Park Hee-young 50', 59' (pen.); Kwak Ji-hye 65', 71', 76'; Cho So-hyun 78'; Lee Jin-hwa 87', 88' | Report |

Tainan County Stadium, Tainan County
Attendance: 500
Referee: Pannipar Kamnueng (Thailand)

28 August 2009
16:30 UTC+8

| Chinese Taipei | 17–0 | Northern Mariana Islands |
|---|---|---|
| Lin Yu-hui 14', 25' (pen.), 34', 65', 69', 70', 72'; Lin Ya-han 19'; Tseng Shu-o 31', 36'; Katie Lee Peters 41' (o.g.); Chen Hsiao-Chuan 44'; Hsieh I-ling 49', 83'; Hill 67' (o.g.); Tan Wen-lin 76'; Tsai Hsin-yun 82' | Report |

Tainan County Stadium, Tainan County
Attendance: 1,200
Referee: Siu Ming Wai (Hong Kong)
28 August 2009
19:00 UTC+8

| South Korea | 7–0 | Hong Kong |
|---|---|---|
| Yoo Young-a 6'; Kim Soo-yun 60', 65', 84', 90+' (pen.); Lee Jang-mi 66'; Jeon Ga-eul 88' | Report |

Tainan County Stadium, Tainan County
Attendance: 300
Referee: Pannipar Kamnueng (Thailand)

30 August 2009
16:30 UTC+8

| Guam | 0–1 | Hong Kong |
|---|---|---|
| | Report | Ng Wing Kum 66' |

Tainan County Stadium, Tainan County
Attendance: 300
Referee: Kim Sook Hee (South Korea)
30 August 2009
19:00 UTC+8

| Chinese Taipei | 0–6 | South Korea |
|---|---|---|
| | Report | Jeon Ga-eul 11', 90+1'; Yoo Young-a 28'; Kwon Hah-nul 39'; Kim Soo-yun 65' (pen.); Ji So-yun 81' (pen.) |

Tainan County Stadium, Tainan County
Attendance: 3,000
Referee: Sato Nami (Japan)

=== Awards ===
| Best Goalkeeper | Top Scorer | Best Defender | Most Valuable Player | Fairplay Award |
|---|---|---|---|---|
| (South Korea) Kim Jung-mi | (Chinese Taipei) Lin Yu-hui | (South Korea) Kim Do-yeon | (South Korea) Cho So-hyun | South Korea |

== Final competition ==
The final competition was held in Tokyo, Japan in February 2010. The North Korean women's team withdrew from the tournament in January 2010, and were replaced by the Chinese Taipei side, the runners-up from the semi-final tournament.

| Team | Pld | W | D | L | GF | GA | GD | Pts |
|---|---|---|---|---|---|---|---|---|
| Japan | 3 | 3 | 0 | 0 | 7 | 1 | +6 | 9 |
| China | 3 | 2 | 0 | 1 | 5 | 3 | +2 | 6 |
| South Korea | 3 | 1 | 0 | 2 | 6 | 4 | +2 | 3 |
| Chinese Taipei | 3 | 0 | 0 | 3 | 0 | 10 | −10 | 0 |

6 February 2010
15:30 UTC+9

| Japan | 2–0 | China |
|---|---|---|
| Miyama 19'; Kinga 61' | Report |

Ajinomoto Stadium, Tokyo
Attendance: 7,459
Referee: Pannipar Kamnueng (Thailand)
7 February 2010
16:30 UTC+9

| South Korea | 4–0 | Chinese Taipei |
|---|---|---|
| Jeon Ga-eul 27'; Lee Jang-mi 28', 45+1'; Yoo Young-a 74' | Report |

Olympic Stadium, Tokyo
Attendance: 684
Referee: Wang Jia (China)

10 February 2010
16:30 UTC+9

| China | 2–1 | South Korea |
|---|---|---|
| Ma Xiaoxu 51'; Yuan Fan 63' | Report | Ji So-yun 85' |

Ajinomoto Stadium, Tokyo
Attendance: 714
Referee: Pannipar Kamnueng (Thailand)
11 February 2010
15:15 UTC+9

| Japan | 3–0 | Chinese Taipei |
|---|---|---|
| Iwabuchi 36', 59'; Takase 85' | Report |

Olympic Stadium, Tokyo
Attendance: 3,774
Referee: Kim Sook-hee (Korea Republic)

13 February 2010
13:00 UTC+9

| Chinese Taipei | 0–3 | China |
|---|---|---|
| | Report | Han Duan 46', 60'; Pang Fengyue 75' |

Ajinomoto Stadium, Tokyo
Attendance: 728
Referee: Etsuko Fukano (Japan)
13 February 2010
15:35 UTC+9

| Japan | 2–1 | South Korea |
|---|---|---|
| Ohno 7'; Yamaguchi 17' | Report | Yoo Young-a 75' |

Ajinomoto Stadium, Tokyo
Attendance: 3,132
Referee: Bentla D'Coth (India)

=== Goals ===
2 goals

- (China) Han Duan
- (Japan) Mana Iwabuchi
- (South Korea) Lee Jang-mi
- (South Korea) Yoo Young-a

1 goals

- (China) Ma Xiaoxu
- (China) Pang Fengyue
- (China) Yuan Fan
- (Japan) Yukari Kinga
- (Japan) Shinobu Ohno
- (Japan) Megumi Takase
- (Japan) Mami Yamaguchi
- (South Korea) Jeon Ga-eul
- (South Korea) Ji So-yun

=== Awards ===
| Best Goalkeeper | Top Scorer | Best Defender | Most Valuable Player | Fairplay Award |
|---|---|---|---|---|
| (China) Zhang Yanru | (China) Han Duan (Japan) Mana Iwabuchi (South Korea) Lee Jang-mi (South Korea) Yoo Young-a | (Japan) Azusa Iwashimizu | (Japan) Homare Sawa | China |

== See also ==
- List of sporting events in Taiwan
