= 2013 EAFF Women's East Asian Cup Preliminary squads =

Below are the squads for the 2013 EAFF Women's East Asian Cup tournament, held in South Korea on from 20 to 27 July 2013.

== Chinese Taipei ==
No.	Pos.	Player	Date of birth (age)	Caps	Goals	Club
1	GK	Tsai Ming-jung (蔡明容)	January 23, 1989 (age 36)	0	0	(Chinese Taipei Football Association) ANL Mulan
5	MF	Liu Chien-yun (劉千芸)	August 8, 1992 (age 33)	0	0	(Chinese Taipei Football Association) NTUPES
8	MF	Wang Hsiang-huei (王湘惠)	September 28, 1987 (age 38)	+1	+0	(Chinese Taipei Football Association) ANL Mulan
9	DF	Lin Chiung-Ying (林瓊鶯) (Captain)	November 2, 1987 (age 37)	+1	+1	(Chinese Taipei Football Association) ANL Mulan
11	FW	Lai Li-chin (賴麗琴)	August 15, 1988 (age 37)	0	0	(Chinese Taipei Football Association) ANL Mulan
14	MF	Lin Ya-hui (林雅惠)	November 27, 1991 (age 33)	0	0	(Chinese Taipei Football Association) NTNU
16	FW	Yu Hsiu-chin (余秀菁)	June 1, 1990 (age 35)	1	0	(Chinese Taipei Football Association) NTNU
17	DF	Hsieh I-ling (謝宜玲)	January 5, 1988 (age 37)	+1	+0	(Chinese Taipei Football Association) NTNU
19	DF	Lin Man-Ting (林曼婷)	July 10, 1990 (age 35)	1	1	(Chinese Taipei Football Association) NTUPES
20	MF	Lin Yun (林勻)	July 13, 1993 (age 32)	0	0	(Chinese Taipei Football Association) NTUPES
21	MF	Lin Kai-ling (林凱玲)	September 21, 1991 (age 34)	0	0	(Chinese Taipei Football Association) NTUPES
22	DF	Chen Chia-hui (陳佳惠)	November 29, 1992 (age 32)	0	0	(Chinese Taipei Football Association) NTNU
23	MF	Lin Ya-han (林雅涵)	December 15, 1990 (age 34)	1	1	(Chinese Taipei Football Association) NTNU
24	FW	Lee Hsiu-chin (李綉琴)	August 18, 1992 (age 33)	0	0	(Chinese Taipei Football Association) NTUPES
25	DF	Hou Fang-wei (侯芳瑋)	April 20, 1992 (age 33)	0	0	(Chinese Taipei Football Association) Hsing Wu U
29	DF	Chang Shu-chin (張淑晶)	May 5, 1992 (age 33)	0	0	(Chinese Taipei Football Association) NTNU
31	MF	Chan Pi-han (詹筆涵)	April 27, 1992 (age 33)	0	0	(Chinese Taipei Football Association) NTNU
32	FW	Wu Shih-ping (吳詩萍)	July 13, 1992 (age 33)	0	0	(Chinese Taipei Football Association) NTNU
36	FW	Chen Yi-ping (陳怡萍)	November 18, 1995 (age 29)	0	0	(Chinese Taipei Football Association) Yung Ching High School
37	GK	Chu Fang-yi (朱芳儀)	October 19, 1993 (age 31)	0	0	(Chinese Taipei Football Association) NTNU

== Guam ==
No.	Pos.	Player	Date of birth (age)	Caps	Goals	Club
	GK	Jena Cruz	2 August 1994 (age 31)	0	0	(United States Soccer Federation) Harcum College Bears
	GK	Chyna Ramirez	28 February 1996 (age 29)	0	0	(Guam Football Association) Quality Distributors
	DF	Ashley Besagar	3 June 1991 (age 34)	0	0	(Guam Football Association) Hyundai FC
	DF	Tanya Blas-Cruz	18 September 1990 (age 35)	0	0	(Guam Football Association) Hyundai FC
	DF	Heather Thompson	21 October 1993 (age 31)	0	0	(Guam Football Association) Doosan Lady Crushers
	DF	Kristin Thompson	22 December 1985 (age 39)	0	0	(Guam Football Association) Doosan Lady Crushers
	DF	Tatyana Ungacta	8 August 1995 (age 30)	0	0	(Guam Football Association) Doosan Lady Crushers
	MF	Maria Amezola	17 November 1988 (age 36)	0	0	(United States Soccer Federation) San Diego State
	MF	Hikaru Phoebe Minato	25 June 1994 (age 31)	0	0	(Guam Football Association) Paintco Lady Strykers
	MF	Anjelica Perez	27 January 1991 (age 34)	0	0	(United States Soccer Federation) Saint Martin's University Saints
	MF	Sarah Schiff	17 February 1986 (age 39)	0	0	(United States Soccer Federation) San Diego Sea Lions
	MF	Simone Willter	25 July 1992 (age 33)	0	0	(Guam Football Association) University of Guam Tritons
	FW	Analejsia Lee(captain)	16 September 1990 (age 35)	0	0	(United States Soccer Federation) William Carey University
	FW	Arisa Recella	24 December 1994 (age 30)	0	0	(Guam Football Association) Hyundai FC
	FW	Kimberly Sherman	25 February 1986 (age 39)	0	0	(Guam Football Association) Paintco Lady Strykers
	FW	Meagan Speck	11 June 1994 (age 31)	0	0	(United States Soccer Federation) Charlotte 49ers
	FW	Paige Surber	10 December 1994 (age 30)	0	0	(Guam Football Association) Quality Distributors
