= Indonesia women's national football team results (2000–2009) =

Women's national football team results

This article provides details of international football games played by the Indonesia women's national football team from 2000 to 2009.

== Results ==
Key
Win
Draw
Defeat

=== 2001 ===
5 November 2001 Southeast Asian Games	Vietnam	6–0	Indonesia	Kuala Lumpur, Malaysia
--:-- UTC+8	Đoàn Thị Kim Chi 2'; Nguyễn Thị Mai Lan 20'; Lưu Ngọc Mai 40', 75', 83'; Bùi Thị Hiền Lương 72'	Report		Stadium: Kuala Lumpur Stadium

9 November 2001 Southeast Asian Games	Indonesia	1–0	Singapore	Kuala Lumpur, Malaysia
--:-- UTC+8	Yakomina 16'	Report		Stadium: Kuala Lumpur Stadium

12 November 2001 Southeast Asian Games	Thailand	2–0	Indonesia	Kuala Lumpur, Malaysia
--:-- UTC+8	Sirinard 84'; Pranee 89'	Report		Stadium: Kuala Lumpur Stadium

14 November 2001 Southeast Asian Games	Myanmar	3–0	Indonesia	Kuala Lumpur, Malaysia
--:-- UTC+8	My Nilar Htwe 15'; Hla Hla Than 29'; Mar Lar Win 65'	Report		Stadium: Kuala Lumpur Stadium

=== 2003 ===
31 October 2003 Women Four Nations Tournament	Indonesia	0–6	Thailand	Kuala Lumpur, Malaysia
		Report

2 November 2003 Women Four Nations Tournament	Malaysia	3–1	Indonesia	Kuala Lumpur, Malaysia
		Report

4 November 2003 Women Four Nations Tournament	Indonesia	0–5	Philippines	Kuala Lumpur, Malaysia
		Report

3 December 2003 Southeast Asian Games	Vietnam	6–0	Indonesia	Hai Phong, Vietnam
--:-- UTC+7	Lưu Ngọc Mai 9', 10', 22', 42'; Phùng Minh Nguyệt 18'; Văn Thị Thanh 32'	Report		Stadium: Lạch Tray Stadium

4 December 2003 Southeast Asian Games	Indonesia	1–1	Philippines	Hai Phong, Vietnam
--:-- UTC+7	Jenny 39'	Report	Gusriwati 17' (o.g.)	Stadium: Lạch Tray Stadium

6 December 2003 Southeast Asian Games	Indonesia	2–2	Malaysia	Hai Phong, Vietnam
--:-- UTC+7	Marion 7'; Jenny 37'	Report	Laini 45'; Norlelawati 48'	Stadium: Lạch Tray Stadium

=== 2004 ===
30 September 2004 AFF Women's Championship	Indonesia	1–0	Philippines	Ho Chi Minh City, Vietnam
--:-- UTC+7	Yuniggishi 8'	Report

2 October 2004 AFF Women's Championship	Vietnam B	1–0	Indonesia	Ho Chi Minh City, Vietnam
--:-- UTC+7	Vũ Thị Lành 41'	Report

4 October 2004 AFF Women's Championship	Singapore	1–0	Indonesia	Ho Chi Minh City, Vietnam
--:-- UTC+7	Lim S. 74'	Report

7 October 2004 AFF Women's Championship	Myanmar	7–0	Indonesia	Ho Chi Minh City, Vietnam
--:-- UTC+7	Aye Nander 21'; Than Than Htwe 23'; Nhin Si Myint 25', 38'; Malar Win 30'; Khin Htwe 50'; San San Waw 87'	Report

9 October 2004 AFF Women's Championship	Vietnam	4–1	Indonesia	Ho Chi Minh City, Vietnam
--:-- UTC+7	Lê Thị Hiền 10', 55', 81'; Từ Thị Phụ 83'	Report	Tugiyati 30'

=== 2005 ===
13 June 2005 Women's Asian Cup qualifiers	Indonesia	0–0	Singapore	Hanoi, Vietnam
--:-- UTC+7				Stadium: Mỹ Đình National Stadium

17 June 2005 Women's Asian Cup qualifiers	Thailand	4–0	Indonesia	Hanoi, Vietnam
--:-- UTC+7				Stadium: Mỹ Đình National Stadium

22 November 2005 Southeast Asian Games	Thailand	2–1	Indonesia	Marikina, Philippines
16:00 UTC+8	Naphat 48'; Thanatta 68'	Report	Rosmita 65'	Stadium: Marikina Sports Complex

24 November 2005 Southeast Asian Games	Indonesia	0–5	Myanmar	Marikina, Philippines
16:00 UTC+8		Report		Stadium: Marikina Sports Complex

26 November 2005 Southeast Asian Games	Philippines	2–0	Indonesia	Marikina, Philippines
16:00 UTC+8	A. Impelido 30'; Alley 82'	Report		Stadium: Marikina Sports Complex

30 November 2005 Southeast Asian Games	Vietnam	8–0	Indonesia	Marikina, Philippines
18:30 UTC+8	Văn Thị Thanh 2', 26'; Đỗ Hồng Tiến 13'; Bùi Thị Tuyết 45'; Bùi Thị Tuyết Mai 57', 87'; Nguyễn Thị Hương 58'; Trần Thị Hồng Nga 69'	Report		Stadium: Marikina Sports Complex

=== 2007 ===
7 September 2007 AFF Women's Championship	Indonesia	0–2	Malaysia	Yangon, Myanmar
15:30 UTC+6:30		Report		Stadium: Thuwunna Stadium

9 September 2007 AFF Women's Championship	Indonesia	3–2	Philippines	Yangon, Myanmar
15:30 UTC+6:30		Report		Stadium: Thuwunna Stadium

11 September 2007 AFF Women's Championship	Indonesia	0–8	Vietnam	Yangon, Myanmar
15:30 UTC+6:30		Report	Bùi Thị Tuyết Mai 31', 40'; Doris 35' (o.g.); ? 37' (o.g.); Lê Thị Hồng Nga 45', 46', 65'; ? 80' (o.g.)	Stadium: Thuwunna Stadium

=== 2008 ===
8 October 2008 AFF Women's Championship	Indonesia	0–1	Laos	Ho Chi Minh City, Vietnam
17:45 UTC+8		Report	Sochitta 87' (pen.)	Stadium: Thanh Long Sports Centre

10 October 2008 AFF Women's Championship	Vietnam	4–0	Indonesia	Ho Chi Minh City, Vietnam
15:30 UTC+8	Từ Thị Phụ 4'; Nguyễn Thị Minh Nguyệt 34'; Vũ Thị Huyền Linh 42'; Bùi Thị Tuyết Mai 48'	Report		Stadium: Thanh Long Sports Centre

14 October 2008 AFF Women's Championship	Indonesia	0–6	Myanmar	Ho Chi Minh City, Vietnam
18:00 UTC+8		Report	Aye Nandar Hlaing 5', 27'; My Nilar Htwe 29', 49', 73'; San San Thein 42'; Moe Moe War 75'	Stadium: Thanh Long Sports Centre

16 October 2008 AFF Women's Championship	Indonesia	3–0	Malaysia	Ho Chi Minh City, Vietnam
15:30 UTC+8	Sarce 13'; Yudith 40'; Maulina 62'	Report		Stadium: Thanh Long Sports Centre

=== 2009 ===
5 April 2009 Lady Mamie Ngan Memorial Cup	Indonesia	1–0	Philippines	Hong Kong
		Report
