= Pauline Ng =

Pauline Ng may refer to:

- Pauline Ng (politician), member of the Legislative Council of Hong Kong
- Pauline Ng (entrepreneur), Singaporean entrepreneur
- Pauline Ng (footballer), Hong Kong footballer
