= Philippines national football team results (unofficial matches) =

This is a list of the Philippines national football team results from 1913 to the present day that, for various reasons, are not accorded the status of official International A Matches.

== Results ==
=== 1910s ===
1915 Unofficial Friendly	South China A.A. (Hong Kong)	3–1	Philippines	Shanghai, China
		Report

=== 1930s ===
3 June 1935 Unofficial Friendly	Soerakarta–Djokjakarta XI (Dutch East Indies)	1–1	Philippines	Dutch East Indies
		Report

6 June 1935 Unofficial Friendly	Djokjakarta XI (Dutch East Indies)	1–4	Philippines	Dutch East Indies
		Report

=== 1950s ===
23 May 1953 Friendly	Philippines	1–9	(West Germany) Kickers Offenbach	Manila, Philippines
		Report

=== 1960s ===
6 January 1968 Friendly	Philippines	2–1	(United States) Dallas Tornado	Manila, Philippines
		Report

=== 1970s ===
12 February 1972 Friendly	Philippines	0–6	(Brazil) Cruzeiro	Manila, Philippines
		Report		Stadium: Rizal Memorial Stadium

6 June 1972 1972 Jakarta Anniversary Tournament	South Korea B	1–1	Philippines	Jakarta

23 July 1972 1972 Merdeka Tournament	Philippines	1–1	(Myanmar) Burma B	Ipoh, Malaysia
	84'	Report	33'	Stadium: Perak Stadium

12 December 1975 Friendly	Philippines	2–3	(Malaysia) Sabah FA	Manila, Philippines
		Report

2 January 1979 Friendly	Philippines	5–4	(West Germany) Hertha Zehlendorf	Manila, Philippines
		Report

=== 1980s ===
16 August 1981 1981 Jakarta Anniversary Tournament	Universidad de Guadalajara (Mexico)	12–0	Philippines	Jakarta, Indonesia

18 August 1981 1981 Jakarta Anniversary Tournament	Philippines	2–0	Malaysia B	Jakarta, Indonesia

6 August 1986 1986 President Aquino Cup	Guangdong (China)	2–0	Philippines	Manila, Philippines
				Stadium: Rizal Memorial Stadium

8 August 1986 1986 President Aquino Cup	Philippines	0–5	(Soviet Union) Russian SFSR	Manila, Philippines
				Stadium: Rizal Memorial Stadium

10 August 1986 1986 President Aquino Cup	Philippines	1–5	(Hong Kong) South China	Manila, Philippines
	Unknown		Bredbury (4x); Unknown	Stadium: Rizal Memorial Stadium

=== 1990s ===
7 May 1991 1991 Philippines International Cup	Malay Mail (Malaysia)	1–0	Philippines	Bacolod, Philippines
	Alias 29'	Report		Stadium: Paglaum Sports Complex; Attendance: 20,000

9 May 1991 1991 Philippines International Cup	Philippines	0–0	(Chinese Taipei) Taipei Bank	Bacolod, Philippines
		Report		Stadium: Paglaum Sports Complex; Attendance: 15,000

12 May 1993 1993 Philippines International Cup	Philippines	1–0	(Malaysia) Malay Mail	Bacolod, Philippines
	Fegidero 44'	Report		Stadium: Paglaum Sports Complex; Attendance: 30,000

13 May 1993 1993 Philippines International Cup	Philippines	1–1	(Chinese Taipei) Taipei Bank	Bacolod, Philippines
	Bedia 16'	Report	Lee Shang-chei 19'	Stadium: Paglaum Sports Complex; Attendance: 20,000

14 May 1993 1993 Philippines International Cup	Philippines	1–2	(China) Shanghai	Bacolod, Philippines
	Fegidero 23'	Report	Shian Jianming 37'; Wang Gang 43'	Stadium: Paglaum Sports Complex; Attendance: 20,000

15 February 1997 1997 President's Cup	Philippines	1–1	(Malaysia) Malay Mail	Iloilo City, Philippines
	Russel 20' (pen.)	Report	Unknown	Stadium: Iloilo Sports Complex; Attendance: 30,000

19 February 1997 1997 President's Cup	Philippines	2–0	(Singapore) Woodlands Wellington	Iloilo City, Philippines
	Del Rosario 63'; Lobaton 86'	Report		Stadium: Iloilo Sports Complex

21 February 1997 1997 President's Cup SF	Philippines	0–2	(Thailand) Royal Thai Air Force	Iloilo City, Philippines
		Report	Chomin 6'; Tantatemee 8'	Stadium: Iloilo Sports Complex

7 March 1998 1998 President's Centennial Cup	Philippines	0–1	(Chinese Taipei) Tatung	Iloilo City, Philippines
		Report 1; 2	Wu chun-i 76'	Stadium: Iloilo Sports Complex

9 March 1998 1998 President's Centennial Cup	Philippines	2–1	(Malaysia) Malay Mail	Iloilo City, Philippines
	Piñero 24'; Rosell 40' (pen.)	Report 1, 2	T. Naidu 18'	Stadium: Iloilo Sports Complex

11 March 1998 1998 President's Centennial Cup	Philippines	2–1	(Singapore) Woodlands Wellington	Iloilo City, Philippines
	Saluria 3'; N. Fegidero 57'	Report	Richardson 4'	Stadium: Iloilo Sports Complex; Attendance: 2,000

14 March 1998 1998 President's Centennial Cup SF	Philippines	0–4	Hong Kong Rangers	Bacolod, Philippines
		Report	Tam Kwai-kok 2'; Ambassa 14'; Vorfa 61'; Unknown	Stadium: Negros Occidental Sports Complex; Attendance: 3,000

15 March 1998 1998 President's Centennial Cup 3rd place	Philippines	1–3	(Singapore) Sembawang Rangers	Bacolod, Philippines
	Viliran 11'	Report	Vidan 51', 81'; Alam Shah 72'	Stadium: Negros Occidental Sports Complex

=== 2000s ===
3 April 2006 2006 AFC Challenge Cup GS	Philippines	1–1	India U-20	Chittagong, Bangladesh
15:30 (UTC+6)	Valeroso 19'	Report	Vimal 8'	Stadium: MA Aziz Stadium; Attendance: 2,000; Referee: Salem Mujghef (Jordan)

11 October 2008 Friendly	Rattana Bundit (Thailand)	1–2	Philippines	Bangkok, Thailand
	Unknown (?)	Report	Borromeo (?); Simon Greatwich (?)

13 October 2008 Friendly	Bangkok Glass (Thailand)	2–1	Philippines	Bangkok, Thailand
	Unknown (?)	Report	Mallari (?)

=== 2010s ===
17 January 2010 Friendly	Taipei PE College (Chinese Taipei)	2–1	Philippines	Kaohsiung, Taiwan
	Lo Chih An (?); Lo Chih En (?)	Report 1, 2	Bela-Ong (?)

3 October 2010 Friendly	Chinese Taipei U-23	1–0	Philippines	Tainan, Taiwan
	Unknown (?)	Report

9 October 2010 2010 Long Teng Cup	Hong Kong U-23	4–2 (Note: This match originally took place on 8 October but was postponed 15 minutes into the matches due to heavy rain. FIFA also recognizes this match as a full 'A' international.)	Philippines	Kaohsiung, Taiwan
17:00 (UTC+8)	Chan Man Fai 5'; Xu Deshuai 31'; Lo Kwan Yee 84'; Ju Yingzhi 90+1'	Report	P. Younghusband 58' (pen.), 69'	Stadium: Kaohsiung National Stadium; Attendance: 650; Referee: Kao Jung-fang (Chinese Taipei)

27 November 2010 Friendly	Nakhon Pathom (Thailand)	8–0	Philippines	Nakhon Pathom, Thailand
	Unknown (?)	Report

9 March 2011 Friendly	Kanto Gakuin University (Japan)	4–0	Philippines	Gotemba, Japan
	Unknown (?)	Report		Stadium: Tokino Sumika recreational facility Referee: Ko Hyung-Jin (Korea Republic)

11 March 2011 Friendly	Kanto Gakuin University (Japan)	8–1	Philippines	Gotemba, Japan
	Unknown (?)	Report	Unknown (?)	Stadium: Tokino Sumika recreational facility Referee: Ko Hyung-Jin (Korea Republic)

5 June 2011 Friendly	Philippines	3–4	(Philippines) UFL All Stars	Makati, Philippines
	Caligdong 10'; Greatwich 64'; Araneta 84'	Report 1, 2	Dagroh 41', 75'; M. Hartmann 52'; El-Habbib (90+?)	Stadium: University of Makati Stadium; Attendance: 10,000

15 June 2011 Friendly	Aachen-Düren XI (Germany)	1–4	Philippines	Düren, Germany
	Unknown (?)	Report	P. Younghusband (?); Caligdong (?); J. Younghusband (?)	Stadium: Düren Stadium

17 June 2011 Friendly	Bonner U-19 (Germany)	1–4	Philippines	Alfter, Germany
	Unknown (?)	Report	Araneta (?); P. Younghusband (?); Caligdong (?); Schröck (?)

22 June 2011 Friendly	Ingolstadt 04 (Germany)	4–0	Philippines	Ingolstadt, Germany
	Buchner 14'; Gerber 19'; Etheridge 31' (o.g.); Matip 40'	Report

24 June 2011 Friendly	Darmstadt 98 (Germany)	5–0	Philippines	Darmstadt, Germany
	Steegmann 8'; Heil 12'; Onuwzuruike 14'; Brüdigam 24'; Hübner (?)	Report

16 July 2011 Friendly	Bahrain U23	2–1	Philippines	Riffa, Bahrain
19:00 (UTC+3)	Al Malood 9'; Saeed 49'	Report	Caligdong 40'	Stadium: National Stadium

18 July 2011 Friendly	Bahrain U23	3–1	Philippines	Arad, Bahrain
19:00 (UTC+3)	Juma'a 36'; Mansoor 41'; Saeed (?)	Report	Caligdong 44'	Stadium: Al Muharraq Stadium

3 December 2011 Friendly	Philippines	1–6	(United States) LA Galaxy	Manila, Philippines
	P. Younghusband 42'	Report	Beckham 20'; Magee 39'; Keane 47'; Cristman 63', 87'; Berhalter 81' (pen.)	Stadium: Rizal Memorial Stadium; Referee: Jovanie Villagracia (Philippines)

7 January 2012 Friendly	Philippines	1–3	(Spain) Inter de Madrid	Manila, Philippines
	J. Younghusband 62'	Report	Sánchez 15' (pen.); Fernandez 32'; Feijoo	Stadium: Rizal Memorial Stadium

21 January 2012 Friendly	Philippines	1–1 (2–4 p)	(South Korea) Icheon Citizen FC	Manila, Philippines
	Angeles 89'	Report	Bin Tae Wan 21'	Stadium: Rizal Memorial Stadium
	Penalties
	Guirado (penalty missed); Caligdong (penalty scored); Doctora (penalty scored); De Murga (penalty missed)		(penalty scored) Kim Hyung-Chul; (penalty scored) Hong Min-Soo; (penalty scored) Hyun Woo Lim; (penalty scored) Kwang Hui Kim

11 February 2012 Friendly	Philippines	0–3	Uzbekistan U-23	Dubai, United Arab Emirates
		Report	Turaev 12'; Nagaev 15', 65'	Stadium: Al Maktoum Stadium

13 February 2012 Friendly	Al Ahli SC (Qatar)	1–3	Philippines	Doha, Qatar
	Abshiri 57'	Report	P. Younghusband 9' (?); Wolf (?)	Stadium: Hamad bin Khalifa Stadium

16 February 2012 Friendly	Philippines	0–1	Australia U-23	Dubai, United Arab Emirates
		Report	Hoffman 9'	Stadium: Al Maktoum Stadium; Attendance: 4,000

11 August 2012 Friendly	Chicago Inferno (United States)	3–1	Philippines	Wheaton, United States
	Haworth 7'; Jeske 14', 24'	Report	de Murga 73'	Stadium: Joe Bean Stadium

5 September 2012 Friendly	Cambodia	0–0 (Note: FIFA does not recognized this match as a full 'A' international friendly since the Cambodian side used seven substitutes while the maximum number of substitutions allowed in a game was affixed to six.)	Philippines	Phnom Penh, Cambodia
		Report		Stadium: Olympic Stadium

10 September 2012 Friendly	Laos	2–1 (Note: This match was not a full 'A' international friendly since the referees were not FIFA accredited.)	Philippines	Vientiane, Laos
	Unknown 51' (pen.), 78' (pen.)	Report	Gier 90+2'	Stadium: Laos National Stadium

14 April 2014 Friendly	Al Ahli SC (Qatar)	1–1	Philippines	Doha, Qatar
18:30 (UTC+3)	Unknown (?)	Report	J. Guirado 78'

10 May 2014 Friendly	Al-Muharraq SC (Bahrain)	2–1	Philippines	Riffa, Bahrain
	Unknown (?)	Report	Daniels 90+1'

27 August 2014 Friendly	Philippines	3–1	(Philippines) Global	Manila, Philippines
	P. Younghusband 24'; De Murga 63'; Reichelt 79'	Report	Winhoffer 82'	Stadium: Rizal Memorial Stadium

26 July 2016 Friendly	Philippines	0–2	(Australia) Perth Glory FC	Bantay, Philippines
19:00 (UTC+8)		Report 1, 2	Knowles 67'; Garcia 90+2'	Stadium: Quirino Stadium; Attendance: 6,000

6 November 2018 Unofficial friendly (Note: Match with the Mongolia was a training match. Three periods of 30 minutes were played instead of the standard two periods of 45 minutes.)	Philippines	3–1	Mongolia	Imus, Philippines
		Report		Stadium: Vermosa Sports Hub

31 December 2018 Unofficial friendly (Note: Match with Vietnam was a training match. There were no restrictions on the number of substitutions allowed.)	Vietnam	4–2	Philippines	Doha, Qatar
18:00 UTC+3	Nguyễn Quang Hải 35'; Phan Văn Đức 37'; Đoàn Văn Hậu 65'; Quế Ngọc Hải 75'	Report (VFF); Report (WF)	Reichelt (?), 45'	Stadium: Grand Hamad Stadium

9 June 2019 Unofficial friendly (Note: Match with Guangzhou Evergrand is a practice match. Three periods of 30 minutes were played instead of the standard two periods of 45 minutes.)	Guangzhou Evergrande (RT) (China)	0–0	Philippines	Guangzhou, China
17:35 (UTC+8)		Report		Stadium: Tianhe Stadium

10 October 2019 Unofficial friendly	Philippines	3–1	(Thailand) Chainat Hornbill	Bacolod, Philippines
19:30 (UTC+8)	Guirado (?) Bedic (?) Hartmann (?)			Stadium: Panaad Stadium

=== 2020s ===
June 3, 2022 Unofficial friendly	Philippines	0–1	(Philippines) PFL All-Stars	Biñan, Philippines
			Bedic (?)	Stadium: Biñan Football Stadium

October 15, 2023 Unofficial friendly	Kyrgyzstan	0–1	Philippines	Manama, Bahrain
10:00 UTC+3		Report 1, 2	Menzi 71'	Stadium: Al Ahli Stadium
