= Nargiza Abdurasulova =

Uzbekistani international footballer

Personal information
- Full name: Nargiza Abdurasulova
- Place of birth: Uzbekistan
- Position: Forward

International career^{‡}
Years	Team	Apps	(Gls)
2009–	Uzbekistan	10	(13)
- ‡ National team caps and goals as of 18:59, 1 October 2015 (UTC)

Nargiza Abdurasulova is an Uzbekistani international footballer.

== International goals ==
No.	Date	Venue	Opponent	Score	Result	Competition
1.	11 June 2003	Nakhon Sawan Stadium, Nakhon Sawan, Thailand	Vietnam	2–4	2–4	2003 AFC Women's Championship
2.	13 June 2005	Mỹ Đình National Stadium, Hanoi, Vietnam	Maldives	1–0	6–0	2006 AFC Women's Asian Cup qualification
3.	13 June 2005	Mỹ Đình National Stadium, Hanoi, Vietnam	Maldives	2–0	6–0	2006 AFC Women's Asian Cup qualification
4.	15 June 2005	Mỹ Đình National Stadium, Hanoi, Vietnam	Hong Kong	1–0	3–0	2006 AFC Women's Asian Cup qualification
5.	27 April 2009	KLFA Stadium, Kuala Lumpur, Malaysia	Maldives	3–0	5–0	2010 AFC Women's Asian Cup qualification
6.	27 April 2009	KLFA Stadium, Kuala Lumpur, Malaysia	Maldives	4–0	5–0	2010 AFC Women's Asian Cup qualification
7.	27 April 2009	KLFA Stadium, Kuala Lumpur, Malaysia	Maldives	5–0	5–0	2010 AFC Women's Asian Cup qualification
8.	29 April 2009	KLFA Stadium, Kuala Lumpur, Malaysia	Palestine	1–0	5–0	2010 AFC Women's Asian Cup qualification
9.	29 April 2009	KLFA Stadium, Kuala Lumpur, Malaysia	Palestine	2–0	5–0	2010 AFC Women's Asian Cup qualification
10.	29 April 2009	KLFA Stadium, Kuala Lumpur, Malaysia	Palestine	5–0	5–0	2010 AFC Women's Asian Cup qualification
11.	1 May 2009	KLFA Stadium, Kuala Lumpur, Malaysia	Kyrgyzstan	2–0	2–0	2010 AFC Women's Asian Cup qualification
12.	4 July 2009	Rajamangala Stadium, Bangkok, Thailand	Thailand	1–1	1–6	2010 AFC Women's Asian Cup qualification
13.	6 July 2009	Rajamangala Stadium, Bangkok, Thailand	Iran	1–0	4–1	2010 AFC Women's Asian Cup qualification
14.	11 March 2015	Petra Stadium, Amman, Jordan	Palestine	5–0	6–0	2016 AFC Women's Olympic Qualifying Tournament

== See also ==
- List of Uzbekistan women's international footballers
