= Tseng Shu-o =

Chinese football player from Taiwan

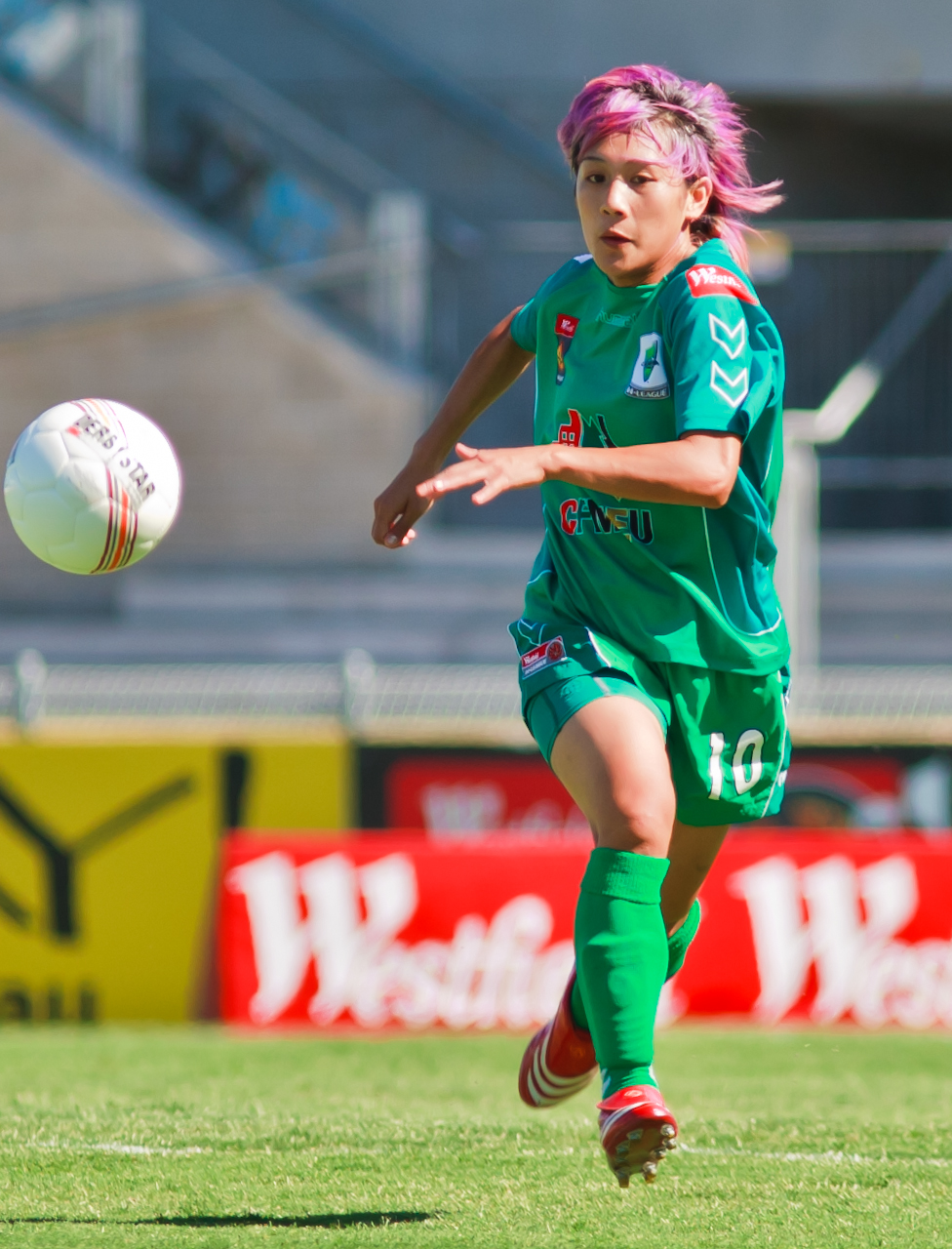
- Tseng in 2009

Personal information
- Full name: Tseng Shu-o (曾淑娥)
- Date of birth: 6 September 1984 (age 42)
- Place of birth: Kaohsiung, Taiwan
- Height: 1.51 m (4 ft 11 in)
- Position: Midfielder

Team information
- Current team: Joventut Almassora

Youth career
- 1999–2002: Hsiao Kang SHS
- 2002–2006: Taiwan PE College
- 2006–2009: NTNU

Senior career*
| Years | Team | Apps | (Gls) |
| 2009 | Canberra United | 11 | (4) |
| 2010 | Colorado Rush | 9 | (3) |
| 2010–2011 | Canberra United | 6 | (0) |
| 2011 | Vancouver Whitecaps | 5 | (0) |
| 2012 | Spokane Shine | 12 | (5) |
| 2012–2013 | AS Saint-Étienne | 13 | (6) |
| 2014 | SV Neulengbach | 12 | (5) |
| 2015 | Fylkir | 13 | (1) |
| 2015–2016 | ASPTT Albi | 9 | (0) |
| 2016 | Fylkir | 4 | (1) |
| 2016–2017 | ŽFK Spartak Subotica | 9 | (4) |
| 2017–2018 | Henan Huishang | | |
| 2019 | ŽNK Split | | |
| 2020 | ASPTT Albi | | |
| 2021– | Joventut Almassora | | |

International career
| 2002– | Chinese Taipei | 4 | (1) |
- * Club domestic league appearances and goals

Tseng Shu-o (Chinese: 曾淑娥; pinyin: Céng Shú'é; born 6 September 1984) is a Taiwanese footballer who plays as a midfielder for Spanish Primera Nacional club CF Joventut Almassora. She has represented Chinese Taipei since 2002, and she received the Most Valuable Player award in the AFC U-19 Women's Championship in 2002.

Unlike most female players in the country that give themselves to teaching or other careers after graduating from college, Tseng kept seeking opportunities to play abroad. In March 2009, she passed the test provided by Fukuoka J. Anclas, a club in the Japanese L. League Division 2. However, because the Fukuoka club does not pay wages to players, she gave it up due to lacking stable financial assistance for living in Japan. In September, she joined Canberra United FC of Australian W-League with Chinese Taipei teammate Lin Chiung-ying.

Tseng made her debut for Canberra United in 2009 W-League season's first-round game against Sydney FC on October 11, 2009. However, she could not help the team and Canberra lost 1–2. On October 17, she scored her first goal in the 3rd-round game in which Canberra had a 2–2 draw with Perth Glory. On October 24, 2009, she scored twice, in a 2–0 victory for Canberra United over Melbourne Victory. The second goal was particularly sublime, as she weaved through defenders and rounded the goalkeeper to score. On September 20, 2012, she signed with AS Saint Étienne.

Tseng has also made an impression for Canberra United, with her striking purple-coloured hair.

== Early life ==
Tseng Shu-o' was born in Taoyuan, Kaohsiung County – now part of Kaohsiung City. She is a Taiwanese indigenous who belongs to the Bunun tribe.

== International goals ==
Scores and results list Chinese Taipei's goal tally first.

| No. | Date | Venue | Opponent | Score | Result | Competition |
|---|---|---|---|---|---|---|
| 1. | 16 June 2005 | Mỹ Đình National Stadium, Hanoi, Vietnam | Guam | 4–0 | 11–0 | 2006 AFC Women's Asian Cup qualification |
| 2. | 16 June 2005 | Mỹ Đình National Stadium, Hanoi, Vietnam | Guam | 5–0 | 11–0 | 2006 AFC Women's Asian Cup qualification |
| 3. | 19 June 2005 | Mỹ Đình National Stadium, Hanoi, Vietnam | Singapore | 2–0 | 3–0 | 2006 AFC Women's Asian Cup qualification |
| 4. | 5 July 2007 | LeoPalace Resort Main Stadium, Yona, Guam | Hong Kong | 8–0 | 8–0 | 2008 EAFF Women's Football Championship |
| 5. | 22 August 2009 | Tainan County Stadium, Tainan County, Taiwan | Hong Kong | 6–0 | 8–1 | 2010 EAFF Women's Football Championship |
| 6. | 26 August 2009 | Tainan County Stadium, Tainan County, Taiwan | Guam | 1–0 | 10–0 | 2010 EAFF Women's Football Championship |
| 7. | 26 August 2009 | Tainan County Stadium, Tainan County, Taiwan | Guam | 2–0 | 10–0 | 2010 EAFF Women's Football Championship |
| 8. | 28 August 2009 | Tainan County Stadium, Tainan County, Taiwan | Northern Mariana Islands | 4–0 | 17–0 | 2010 EAFF Women's Football Championship |
| 9. | 28 August 2009 | Tainan County Stadium, Tainan County, Taiwan | Northern Mariana Islands | 6–0 | 17–0 | 2010 EAFF Women's Football Championship |
| 10. | 9 April 2019 | Grand Hamad Stadium, Doha, Qatar | Iran | 3–0 | 4–1 | 2020 AFC Women's Olympic Qualifying Tournament |
