= Tada Keelalay =

Thai footballer (born 1984)

Personal information
- Full name: Tada Keelalay
- Date of birth: 4 January 1984 (age 42)
- Place of birth: Yasothon, Thailand
- Height: 1.75 m (5 ft 9 in)
- Position: Defender

Youth career
- Krung Thai Bank FC

Senior career*
Years	Team	Apps	(Gls)
2004–2006	Bangkok Bank		
2007–2008	Krung Thai Bank		
2009	Bangkok Glass		
2010	Chanthaburi		
2011	Thai Port		
2011–2012	Air Force United		
2012	Phetchaburi		

International career
2005	Thailand U23		
2004	Thailand	5	(0)
Medal record
Thailand under-23
Sea Games
Gold medal – first place	Sea Games 2003	Football
Gold medal – first place	Sea Games 2005	Football
- * Club domestic league appearances and goals as of 14 November 2008

Tada Keelalay (Thai: ธาดา คีละลาย, born January 4, 1984) is a former professional footballer born in Thailand. He had made several appearances for the Thailand national football team, including one qualifying match for the 2006 FIFA World Cup.

== Honours ==
=== International ===
Thailand U-23

- SEA Games: Gold medal 2003, 2005

== Asian Champions League Appearances ==
#	Date	Venue	Opponent	Score	Result
1.	April 9, 2008	Bangkok, Thailand	Nam Dinh	9-1	Won
2.	April 23, 2008	Hanoi, Vietnam	Nam Dinh	2-2	Draw
3.	May 21, 2008	Bangkok, Thailand	Beijing Guoan	5-3	Won
