= Lin Man-ting =

Chinese football player from Taiwan

Personal information
- Date of birth: 10 July 1990 (age 36)
- Place of birth: Hualien, Taiwan
- Height: 1.70 m (5 ft 7 in)
- Position: Midfielder

Youth career
- Taiwan PE College

Senior career*
Years	Team	Apps	(Gls)
2010–2011	Real Valladolid Femenino	16	(3)
2015–2016	ASPTT Albi	6	(0)

International career
2007–2009	Chinese Taipei U-19		
2007–present	Chinese Taipei (football)		
- Chinese Taipei (futsal)
- * Club domestic league appearances and goals

Lin Man-ting (Chinese: 林曼婷; born 10 July 1990 in Hualien City, Taiwan), or Claire, is a Taiwanese female footballer and futsal player with Amis descent. She last played for ASPTT Albi. She was the first ever Taiwanese women player to play for a European club. She usually plays as defensive roles such as midfielder or defender. Her sister Lin Chiung-ying is also footballer, representing Canberra United in the Australian Westfield W-League.

== Biography ==
At the age of 17, Lin represented Chinese Taipei U-19 in the AFC U-19 Women's Championship 2007. She also made her senior team debut in 2007, in the qualification games for 2008 Summer Olympics, and became Chinese Taipei's regular start since then.

In January 2010, after fending off contenders from Africa and Canada in the tryout, Lin received a 2-year contract from Real Valladolid Femenino of Spain's Superliga Femenina. Her shirt name is 'Claire'. She soon established herself and became one of the most promising players in the club. Her success in Spain has increased Real Valladolid's, as well as other Spanish clubs', interests and understandings to Taiwanese female players and also motivated the latters to challenge the world stage of football. She currently earns 200 euros with Real Valladolid and due to the low pay rumors have it she will sign with Real Madrid femenino this summer on a 1000 euros a month deal. Following Lin, Real Valladolid decided to sign her compatriots Chen Hsiao-chuan and Tan Wen-lin in April 2010.
