= Sukunya Peangthem =

Thai footballer

Personal information
- Date of birth: 5 September 1988 (age 38)
- Height: 1.63 m (5 ft 4 in)
- Position: Forward

International career^{‡}
Years	Team	Apps	(Gls)
2007	Thailand U19	1+	(0)
2009	Thailand	1+	(1)
- ‡ National team caps and goals as of 8 July 2009

Sukunya Peangthem (born 5 September 1988) is a Thai footballer who plays as a forward. She has been a member of the Thailand women's national team.

== International career ==
Peangthem represented Thailand at the 2007 AFC U-19 Women's Championship. She capped at senior level during two AFC Women's Asian Cup qualifications (2008 and 2010).

=== International goals ===
Scores and results list Thailand's goal tally first

No.	Date	Venue	Opponent	Score	Result	Competition	Ref.
1	20 June 2005	Mỹ Đình National Stadium, Hanoi, Vietnam	India	2–2	3–2	2006 AFC Women's Asian Cup qualification	
2	7 December 2006	Al-Arabi Stadium, Doha, Qatar	Jordan	4–0	5–0	2006 Asian Games	
3	7 December 2006	Al-Arabi Stadium, Doha, Qatar	Jordan	5–0	5–0	2006 Asian Games	
4	8 July 2009	Rajamangala Stadium, Bangkok, Thailand	Iran	8–1	8–1	2010 AFC Women's Asian Cup qualification	
5	8 December 2009	National University of Laos Stadium, Vientiane, Laos	Laos	4–1	4–1	2009 SEA Games	
6	11 December 2009	National University of Laos Stadium, Vientiane, Laos	Vietnam	2–2	2–2	2009 SEA Games	
