= Bùi Thị Phượng =

Vietnamese footballer

Personal information
- Full name: Bùi Thị Phượng
- Date of birth: June 15, 1986 (age 40)
- Place of birth: Đông Triều, Quảng Ninh, Vietnam
- Height: 1.57 m (5 ft 2 in)
- Position: Forward

Senior career*
Years	Team	Apps	(Gls)
2003–2017	Than Khoáng Sản	83	(52)

International career^{‡}
2005–2015	Vietnam	43	(21)
- * Club domestic league appearances and goals ‡ National team caps and goals as of 24 March 2008

Bùi Thị Phượng (born 15 June 1986) is a Vietnamese footballer who played as a forward. She has been a member of the Vietnam women's national team.

== International goals ==
Scores and results list Vietnam's goal tally first

No.	Date	Venue	Opponent	Score	Result	Competition	Ref.
1	24 March 2008	Thành Long Stadium, Ho Chi Minh City, Vietnam	Iran	4–1	4–1	2008 AFC Women's Asian Cup qualification	
