= Lin Yu-hui =

Taiwanese footballer

Personal information
- Full name: Lin Yu-hui
- Position: Forward

International career^{‡}
Years	Team	Apps	(Gls)
2005–2009	Chinese Taipei	7+	(22+)
- ‡ National team caps and goals as of 28 August 2009

Lin Yu-hui (Chinese: 林玉慧) is a Taiwanese former footballer who played as a forward. She has been a member of the Chinese Taipei women's national team.

== International career ==
Lin Yu-hui capped for Chinese Taipei at senior level during two AFC Women's Asian Cup qualifiers (2006 and 2008).

=== International goals ===
Scores and results list Chinese Taipei's goal tally first

No.	Date	Venue	Opponent	Score	Result	Competition
1.	14 June 2005	Mỹ Đình National Stadium, Hanoi, Vietnam	India	2–1	2–1	2006 AFC Women's Asian Cup qualification
2.	16 June 2005	Mỹ Đình National Stadium, Hanoi, Vietnam	Guam	1–0	11–0	2006 AFC Women's Asian Cup qualification
3.	16 June 2005	Mỹ Đình National Stadium, Hanoi, Vietnam	Guam	2–0	11–0	2006 AFC Women's Asian Cup qualification
4.	16 June 2005	Mỹ Đình National Stadium, Hanoi, Vietnam	Guam	3–0	11–0	2006 AFC Women's Asian Cup qualification
5.	16 June 2005	Mỹ Đình National Stadium, Hanoi, Vietnam	Guam	5–0	11–0	2006 AFC Women's Asian Cup qualification
6.	16 June 2005	Mỹ Đình National Stadium, Hanoi, Vietnam	Guam	6–0	11–0	2006 AFC Women's Asian Cup qualification
7.	19 June 2005	Mỹ Đình National Stadium, Hanoi, Vietnam	Singapore	3–0	3–0	2006 AFC Women's Asian Cup qualification
8.	1 July 2007	LeoPalace Resort Main Stadium, Yona, Guam	South Korea	1–3	1–4	2008 EAFF Women's Football Championship
9.	5 July 2007	LeoPalace Resort Main Stadium, Yona, Guam	Hong Kong	2–0	8–0	2008 EAFF Women's Football Championship
10.	5 July 2007	LeoPalace Resort Main Stadium, Yona, Guam	Hong Kong	3–0	8–0	2008 EAFF Women's Football Championship
11.	5 July 2007	LeoPalace Resort Main Stadium, Yona, Guam	Hong Kong	5–0	8–0	2008 EAFF Women's Football Championship
12.	5 July 2007	LeoPalace Resort Main Stadium, Yona, Guam	Hong Kong	6–0	8–0	2008 EAFF Women's Football Championship
13.	24 March 2008	Thành Long Stadium, Ho Chi Minh City, Vietnam	Myanmar	2–0	3–0	2008 AFC Women's Asian Cup qualification
14.	24 March 2008	Thành Long Stadium, Ho Chi Minh City, Vietnam	Myanmar	3–0	3–0	2008 AFC Women's Asian Cup qualification
15.	22 August 2009	Tainan County Stadium, Tainan County, Taiwan	Hong Kong	1–0	8–1	2010 EAFF Women's Football Championship
16.	22 August 2009	Tainan County Stadium, Tainan County, Taiwan	Hong Kong	4–0	8–1	2010 EAFF Women's Football Championship
17.	26 August 2009	Tainan County Stadium, Tainan County, Taiwan	Guam	5–0	10–0	2010 EAFF Women's Football Championship
18.	28 August 2009	Tainan County Stadium, Tainan County, Taiwan	Northern Mariana Islands	1–0	17–0	2010 EAFF Women's Football Championship
19.	28 August 2009	Tainan County Stadium, Tainan County, Taiwan	Northern Mariana Islands	3–0	17–0	2010 EAFF Women's Football Championship
20.	28 August 2009	Tainan County Stadium, Tainan County, Taiwan	Northern Mariana Islands	5–0	17–0	2010 EAFF Women's Football Championship
21.	28 August 2009	Tainan County Stadium, Tainan County, Taiwan	Northern Mariana Islands	10–0	17–0	2010 EAFF Women's Football Championship
22.	28 August 2009	Tainan County Stadium, Tainan County, Taiwan	Northern Mariana Islands	12–0	17–0	2010 EAFF Women's Football Championship
23.	28 August 2009	Tainan County Stadium, Tainan County, Taiwan	Northern Mariana Islands	13–0	17–0	2010 EAFF Women's Football Championship
24.	28 August 2009	Tainan County Stadium, Tainan County, Taiwan	Northern Mariana Islands	14–0	17–0	2010 EAFF Women's Football Championship
