= Real Valladolid (women) =

Spanish football club

Real Valladolid Femenino
- Full name: Real Valladolid Club de Fútbol, S.A.D.
- Nickname(s): RVF, Pucela, Blanquivioletas, Albivioletas
- Founded: 2009
- Dissolved: 2011
- Ground: Anexos al Estadio José Zorrilla, Valladolid, España
- Capacity: 1.500
- Chairman: (Spain) Carlos Suárez
- Manager: (Spain) Paco de la Fuente
- League: Superliga Femenina
- 2010–11: Superliga Femenina, 22nd
Home colours	Away colours

Real Valladolid Femenino, founded in 2009, was a team that represented Real Valladolid in the Superliga Femenina for two years.

== History ==
In June 2009, Real Valladolid received an invitation from the Royal Spanish Football Federation to create a team to compete in the Superliga Femenina. Real Valladolid accepted the invitation and started searching for players for women's football team around Valladolid.

Valladolid ended the first stage of the competition last with just 2 points. The team improved slightly in the second stage, and attained its first win in an official match in January 2010 with a 2–0 win over Gimnàstic. They ended the competition with 12 points from 3 wins and 3 ties in 26 games. The lack of relegations that season meant they would continue in the top division one more year.

Soon before the 2010–11 season RFEF announced the return to the traditional competition system for the 2011–12 season and the relegation of the 7 lower-ranking teams. Valladolid didn't improve in its second season, ending the year with even lower numbers - 7 points from 1 win and 4 ties in 26 games, and was thus relegated.

The club then decided to disband the team. The section's dissolution was announced on July 11. Many of the team's players moved to nearby team Rayo Simancas, which had just earned promotion to the second category.

=== Notable former players ===
- (Taiwan) Chen Hsiao-chuan
- (Taiwan) Lin Man-ting
- (Taiwan) Tan Wen-lin
