= Kuo Tzu-hui =

Taiwanese football player and manager

Personal information
- Position: Defender

International career^{‡}
Years	Team	Apps	(Gls)
2008	Chinese Taipei	3	(2)

Managerial career
- 2011: Chinese Taipei Women (assistant coach)
- ‡ National team caps and goals as of 28 March 2018

Kuo Tzu-hui (Chinese: 郭子輝) is a Taiwanese football manager and former player who played as a defender. She has been a member of the Chinese Taipei women's national team.

== International career ==
Kuo Tzu-hui capped for Chinese Taipei at senior level during the 2008 AFC Women's Asian Cup qualification.

=== International goals ===
Scores and results list Chinese Taipei's goal tally first

No.	Date	Venue	Opponent	Score	Result	Competition	Ref.
1	26 March 2008	Thành Long Stadium, Ho Chi Minh City, Vietnam	Vietnam	1–1	1–3	2008 AFC Women's Asian Cup qualification	
2	28 March 2008	Thống Nhất Stadium, Ho Chi Minh City, Vietnam	Iran	2–2	2–3	2008 AFC Women's Asian Cup qualification	

== Managerial career ==
Kuo Tzu-hui was an assistant coach of the Chinese Taipei women's national football team in 2011.
