= Lin Chiung-ying =

Taiwanese football and futsal player

Personal information
- Date of birth: 2 November 1987 (age 39)
- Place of birth: Guangfu, Hualien, Taiwan
- Height: 1.70 m (5 ft 7 in)
- Position: Defender

Youth career
- Hualien PEHS
- 2006–2009: Taiwan PE College

Senior career*
Years	Team	Apps	(Gls)
2009–2011	Canberra United FC	5	(0)

International career
- Chinese Taipei
- Chinese Taipei (futsal)
- * Club domestic league appearances and goals

Lin Chiung-ying (Chinese: 林瓊鶯; born 2 November 1987) is a Taiwanese football and futsal player. She comes from Amis tribe and usually plays as a defender. Her sister Lin Man-ting is also footballer.

In July 2009, Lin and national teammates Tseng Shu-o and Wang Hsiang-huei participated in Canberra United FC's international trial. She joined the club in September 2009 and made her debut in October. However, she suffered injury after 5 club appearances and missed most of the season.
