= Pauline Ng (footballer) =

Hong Kong footballer

Personal information
- Full name: Pauline Ng Po Lam
- Date of birth: 3 August 1980 (age 46)
- Place of birth: Hong Kong
- Position: Defender

International career^{‡}
Years	Team	Apps	(Gls)
2007–2013	Hong Kong	6+	(1)
- ‡ National team caps and goals as of 26 May 2013

Pauline Ng Po Lam (born 3 August 1980) is a Hong Kong retired footballer who played as a defender. She represented Hong Kong internationally.

== International career ==
Ng represented Hong Kong at three AFC Women's Asian Cup qualification editions (2008, 2010 and 2014), the 2012 AFC Women's Olympic Qualifying Tournament and the 2014 Asian Games.

== See also ==
- List of Hong Kong women's international footballers
