= Paglaum Sports Complex =

Sports venue in Bacolod, Philippines

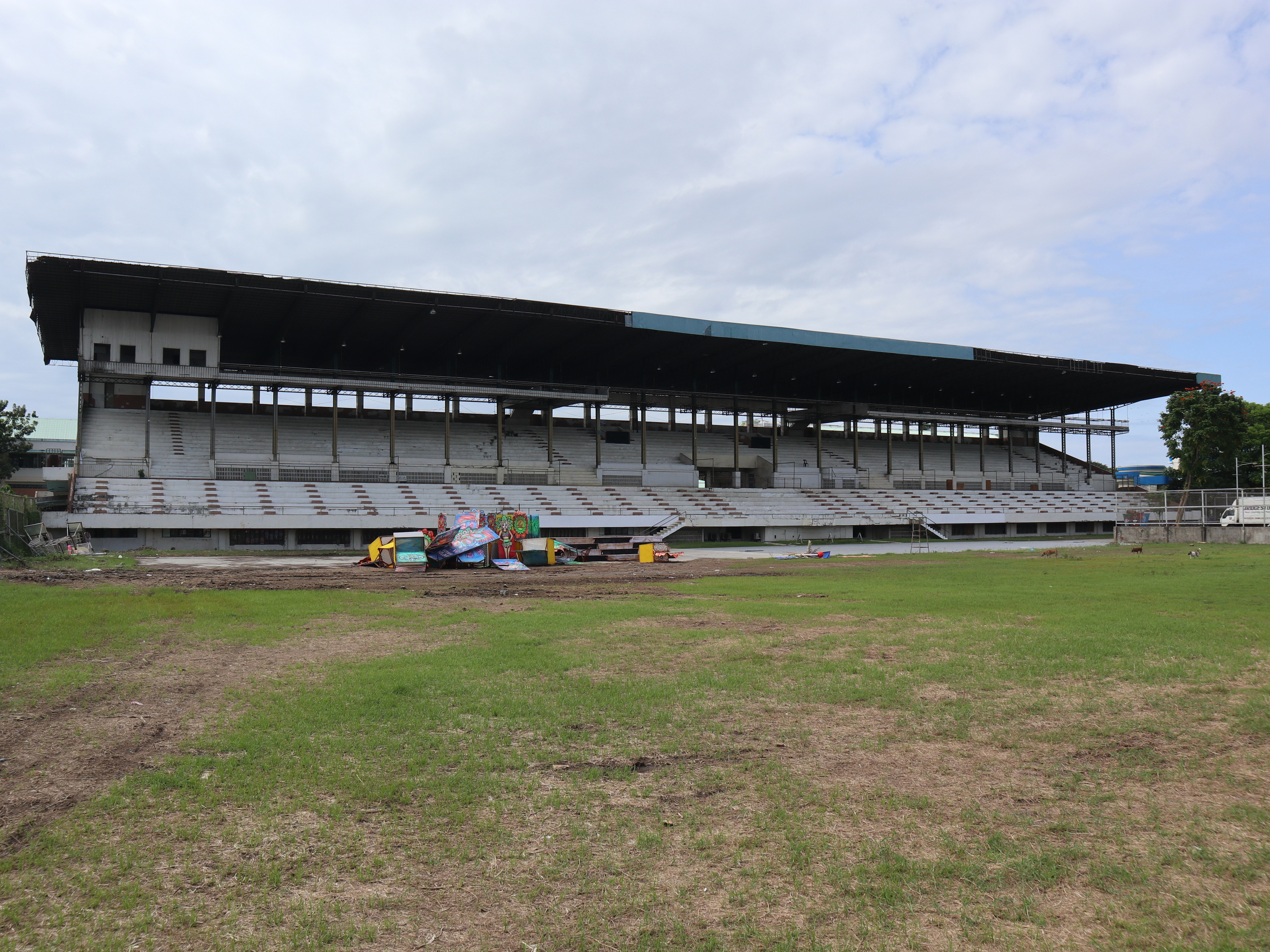

- Location within Visayas Location within Philippines
- Location: Lacson and Hernaez Streets, Bacolod, Philippines
- Coordinates: 10°39′40″N 122°56′44″E
- Owner: Negros Occidental Provincial Government
- Operator: Department of Education
- Capacity: 7,200

Construction
- Built: 1966
- Opened: 1967

The Paglaum Sports Complex is a sports venue in Bacolod, Philippines adjacent to the Negros Occidental High School. It was established during the administration of Governor Alfredo Montelibano Jr. in the 1970s. It hosted three editions of the Palarong Pambansa (1971, 1974, 1979).

The complex was under supervision of the Department of Education (DepEd) until 2011. DepEd and the provincial government of Negros Occidental signed a compromise agreement where in DepEd returned the supervision of the complex to the provincial government.

In 2012, a two-hectare portion of the four-hectare Paglaum Sports Complex was partitioned for the construction of the Capitol-owned Negros First CyberCentre (NFCC) as an IT-BPO Outsourcing Hub. It was inaugurated in April 2015 in rites led by President Benigno S. Aquino III.

Recently, the Paglaum Sports Complex serves as an alternative venue to the Bacolod Public Plaza for the MassKara Festival celebration.

== Paglaum Stadium ==
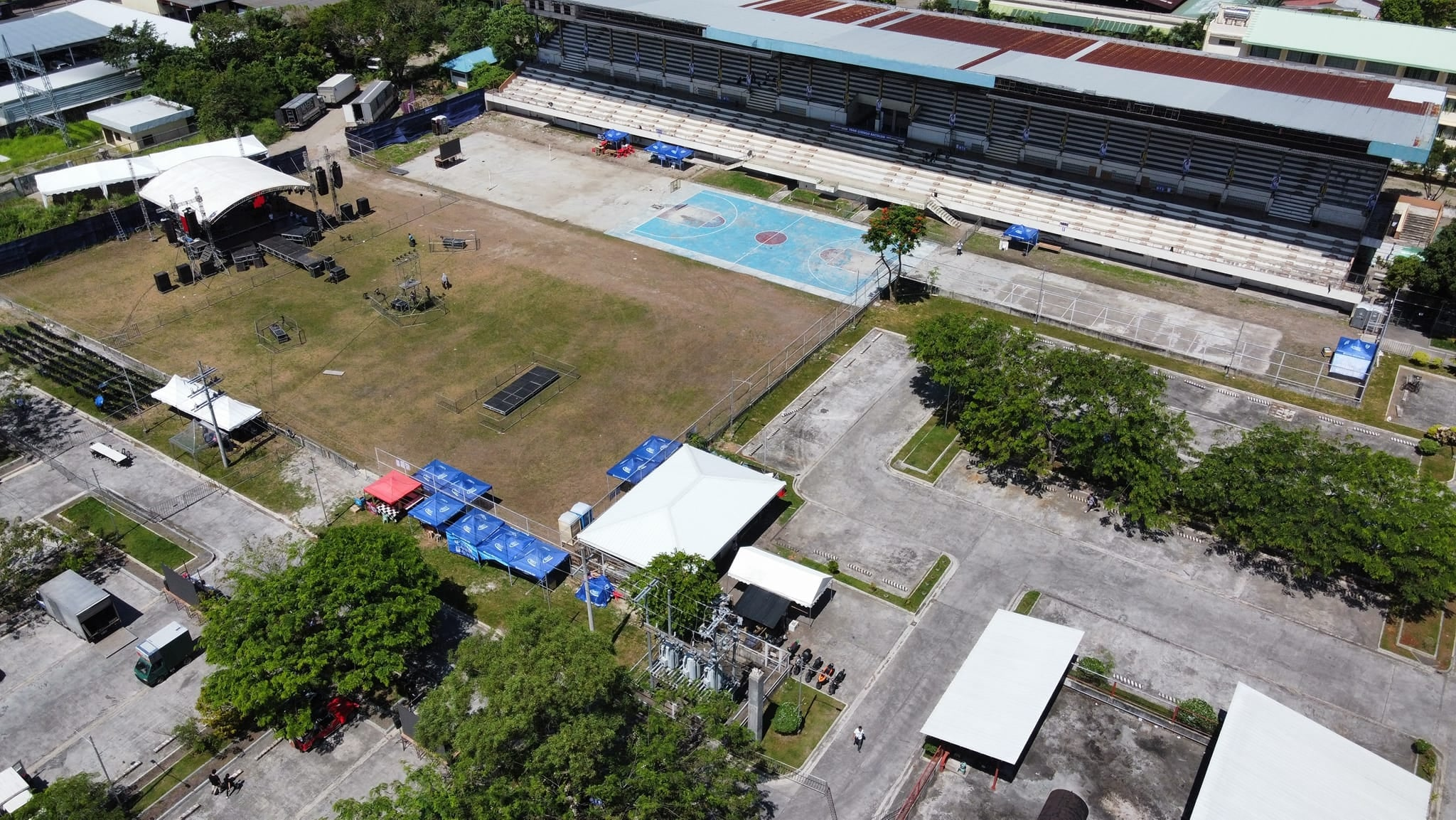
Paglaum Sports Complex, 2022

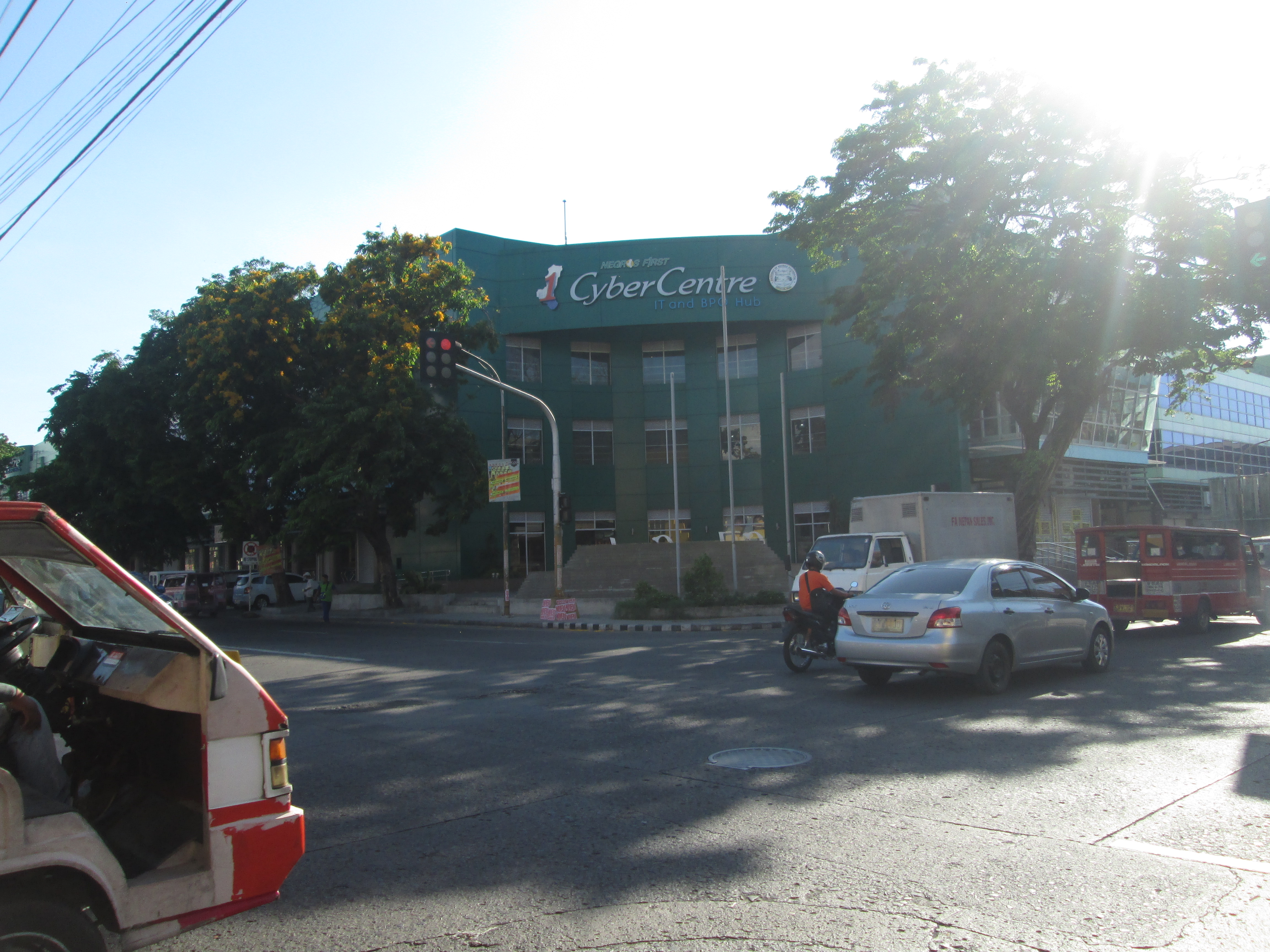
Negros First CyberCentre IT and BPO Hub

The Paglaum Stadium hosted various football events, such as the 1991 Philippines International Cup and the football event of the 2005 Southeast Asian Games.

The stadium became unfit to host football matches following the erection of business establishments around the area. As of 2013, the provincial government has been proposing for a renovation of the stadium to serve as alternative venue to Panaad Stadium, particularly for football competition.

While the complex itself is run by DepEd, the lighting of the stadium is owned by the Philippine Sports Commission.

== See also ==
- Panaad Park and Sports Complex
