= Angeline Impelido =

Former Filipino international footballer

Personal information
- Date of birth: 1983 or 1984 (age 42–43)
- Place of birth: Glen Ellyn, Illinois, United States
- Height: 5 ft 0 in (1.52 m)
- Position: Forward

College career
Years	Team	Apps	(Gls)
2002–2005	Northern Illinois Huskies		

International career
2005–2012	Philippines		

Angeline San Pedro Impelido is a former Filipino international footballer.

== Education ==
Impelido attended Glenbard South High School. She later entered the Northern Illinois University, where she played for the NIU Huskies women's soccer team.

== International career ==
Butchie Impelido, Angeline's father who was an official U.S. scout and recruiter for the Philippine women's team, contacted the team manager Philippine women's team and endorsed his daughter who was the star player of Northern Illinois University at that time. He was told to send a video of Angeline playing football and later asked to go to Manila for try-outs.

Angeline managed to gain a spot at the national team and later played at the 2005 Southeast Asian Games with his younger sister Patrice. She was again called up with her sister to play at the 2007 Southeast Asian Games

She was called up to play for the national team in the 2012 AFF Women's Championship.

== Coaching ==
Impelido became head coach and manager of Illinois-based Hawks White.

== Career statistics ==
=== International goals ===
Scores and results list the Philippines' goal tally first.

#	Date	Venue	Opponent	Score	Result	Competition
1.	12 June 2005	Mỹ Đình National Stadium, Hanoi, Vietnam	Vietnam	1–5	1–6	2006 AFC Women's Asian Cup qualification
2.	26 November 2005	Marikina Sports Complex, Marikina, Philippines	Indonesia	1–0	2–0	2005 Southeast Asian Games
3.	30 November 2005	Marikina Sports Complex, Marikina, Philippines	Myanmar	1–1	1––3	2005 Southeast Asian Games
4.	20 October 2007	Siu Sai Wan Sports Ground, Siu Sai Wan, Hong Kong	Hong Kong	?–?	3–2	2008 AFC Women's Asian Cup qualification
