= Merlo Albano =

Filipino footballer and referee

- Born: Merlo Silva Albano; January 11, 1979 (age 47)
Association football career
Senior career*
Years	Team	Apps	(Gls)
–	Davao		
–	Sakya (futsal)		
International career
2004–2008	Philippines		
- * Club domestic league appearances and goals
Refereeing career
International
Years	League	Role
2012–	FIFA listed	Assistant

Merlo Silva Albano is a former Philippine international footballer and referee.

== Early life and education ==
Born in 1979, Merlo Silva Albano is the fourth child of Loyolo and Mercedes Albano. She graduated from the Holy Cross of Davao College with the bachelor's degree in physical education

== Playing career ==
Albano started playing football as early as 2004. In that year she played for a representative side of Davao in an open tournament in Marikina which gave way for an opportunity to train with the Philippines women's national football team for a month. She then debuted for her country at the 2004 AFF Women's Championship in Vietnam and also played in the 2007 edition of the tournament which was hosted in Myanmar. She played for the national team until 2008 often spending time training in Manila. She decided to retire from the national team due to financial issues and being away from her family in Davao City. She also served as a playing coach for Sakya FC of the Maharlika Sports Development Institute organized She Futsal League.

== Officiating career ==
Affiliated with the Davao-South Regional Football Association of the Philippine Football Federation, Albano became an international referee for FIFA in 2012 and as of 2018 is an assistant referee officiating in women's football matches. She has officiated at the 2022 AFC Women's Asian Cup.
