= Miko Alley =

Filipino footballer

Personal information
- Full name: Mariko Elizabeth Montero Alley
- Place of birth: Huntington, West Virginia, U.S.
- Height: 1.68 m (5 ft 6 in)
- Position: Midfielder

Youth career
- Huntington Highlanders

College career
Years	Team	Apps	(Gls)
2006	West Virginia Mountaineers		

Senior career*
Years	Team	Apps	(Gls)
- Western Virginia United

International career
2005–2007	Philippines		(~1)
- * Club domestic league appearances and goals

Mariko Elizabeth Montero Alley is a footballer who played as a midfielder. Born in the United States, she represented the Philippines national team.

== Early life ==
Alley was raised in Prichard, West Virginia.

== College and club career ==
Alley was signed up to play for the women's soccer team of the West Virginia University, the West Virginia Mountaineers in 2006. She also played for Charlotte Soccer Club at the Super Y league.

== International career ==
In 2003, while playing at the USA Cup in Minnesota, Alley met and was scouted by Philippines men's national team coach Aris Caslib who watched some of her games. In October 2005, the Philippine Football Federation contacted her and team manager Ernie Nierras invited her to the women's national team.

Alley was part of the Philippine women's national team that participated at the 2005 Southeast Asian Games where she made a goal against Indonesia. She was a starting player in all four matches of the Philippine national team.

== Career statistics ==
=== International goals ===
Scores and results list the Philippines' goal tally first.

#	Date	Venue	Opponent	Score	Result	Competition
1.	26 November 2005	Marikina Sports Complex, Marikina, Philippines	Indonesia	2–0	2–0	2005 Southeast Asian Games

== Personal life ==
Alley's parents are Marlene Montero-Alley, her mother who comes from Samar, Philippines and Hugh Alley, her father. She is married to Dennis Gagai since 1 August 2015.
