= Sradhanjali Samantaray =

Indian football player and coach

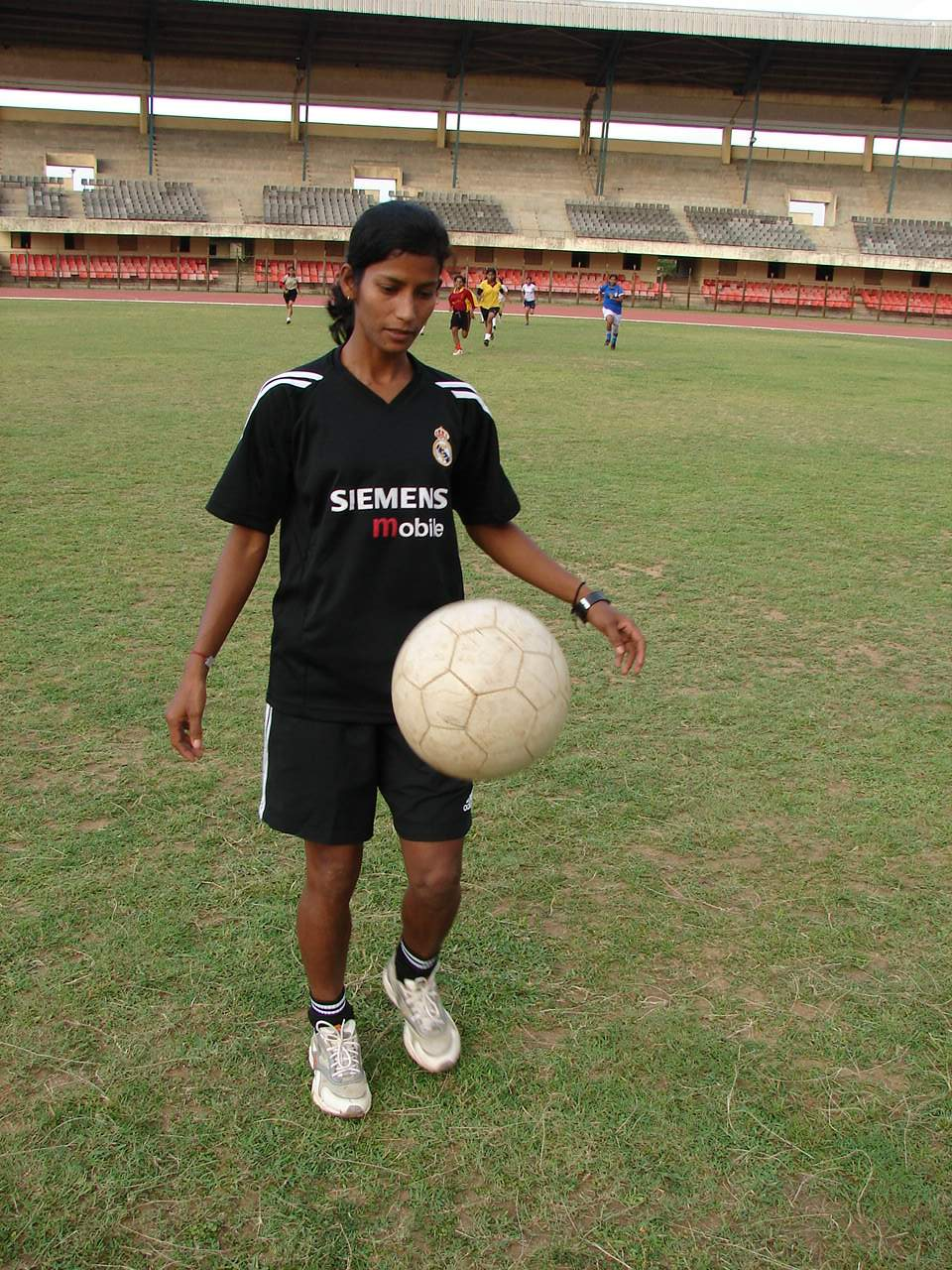

Personal information
- Full name: Sradhanjali Samantaray
- Date of birth: 7 May 1978 (age 48)
- Place of birth: Banapur, Orissa, India
- Position: Striker

Senior career*
Years	Team	Apps	(Gls)
- Odisha

International career
1997–2007	India	?	(1)

Managerial career
- 2015: Odisha
- 2017–2018: Rising Students (assistant)
- 2018: India U17 (assistant)
- 2022: Odisha Police
- 2022: Odisha (assistant)
- 2023–: India U20 (assistant)
- * Club domestic league appearances and goals

Sradhanjali Samantaray (born 7 May 1978 in Banapur, Odisha) is an Indian football coach and former footballer. She currently serves as the assistant coach of the India women's national under-20 football team. She was the first footballer from Odisha to represent and captain the India women's national football team.

== Coaching career ==
She has served as the head coach of Odisha Police in the 2021–22 Indian Women's League and as the assistant coach of the Odisha women's football team in the national tournaments. She is a former Indian international footballer and has served as the captain of the India women's national football team.

In 2014, she was appointed as assistant coach of India's U-16 Girls Football team for the 2015 Asian Football Confederation Cup.

In 2022, she has completed long 31 years in the field of football in various capacities.

== International goals ==
No.	Date	Venue	Opponent	Score	Result	Competition
1.	12 June 2005	Mỹ Đình National Stadium, Hanoi, Vietnam	Guam	1–0	10–0	2006 AFC Women's Asian Cup qualifiers

== Honours ==
Orissa

- Rajmata Jijabai Trophy: 2010–11, runner-up: 2001–02, 2009–10
- National Games Gold medal: 2011, Bronze medal: 2002
