= Football at the 2005 SEA Games =

2005 Southeast Asian Games Men's Football

Tournament details
- Host country: Philippines
- Dates: 20 November – 4 December
- Teams: 9
- Venue: 2 (in 1 host city)

Final positions
- Champions: Thailand (12th title)
- Runners-up: Vietnam
- Third place: Malaysia
- Fourth place: Indonesia

Tournament statistics
- Matches played: 20
- Goals scored: 59 (2.95 per match)

The football tournament at the 2005 SEA Games was held from 20 November to 4 December. The men's tournament is played at under-23 level, while the women's tournament has no age limit.

== Venues ==
Bacolod		Marikina
Panaad Stadium	Paglaum Stadium	Marikina Sports Complex
Capacity: 15,000	Capacity: 7,200	Capacity: 15,000

== Teams ==
Men's tournament

- ~~Brunei~~^{1}
- Cambodia^{2}
- Indonesia
- Laos
- Malaysia
- Myanmar
- Philippines
- Singapore
- Thailand
- Vietnam

Notes:

1. Brunei withdrew.
2. Cambodia were represented by champions Khemera, who had been declared Cambodia's national team by their owner and president of the Cambodian National Olympic Committee, Prince Norodom Ranariddh.

Women's tournament

- Indonesia
- Myanmar
- Philippines
- Thailand
- Vietnam

== Squads ==
Men's tournament

Football at the 2005 SEA Games – Men's team squads

Women's tournament

== Draw ==
The draw was held on 6 November 2005.

== Men's tournament ==
=== Group stage ===
==== Group A ====
Team	Pld	W	D	L	GF	GA	GD	Pts
Thailand	3	3	0	0	4	1	+3	9
Malaysia	3	2	0	1	10	4	+6	6
Philippines (H)	3	1	0	2	6	7	−1	3
Cambodia	3	0	0	3	2	10	−8	0

(H) Hosts

21 November 2005
16:00

Malaysia	5–0	Cambodia
Surendran 8', 83'; Zairo 40'; Rudie 45'; Azlan 60'	Report

Panaad Stadium, Bacolod

23 November 2005
16:30

Philippines	0–1	Thailand
	Report	Jakkrit 36'

Panaad Stadium, Bacolod
Attendance: 25,000

25 November 2005
16:00

Philippines	4–2	Cambodia
J. Younghusband 12'; Borromeo 65'; P. Greatwich 85'; Caligdong 90+?'	Report	Veasoutna 16'; Than 16'

Panaad Stadium, Bacolod
Attendance: 15,000

27 November 2005
16:30

Thailand	2–1	Malaysia
Suchao 43'; Datsakorn 90+3'	Report	Nor 81'

Panaad Stadium, Bacolod

29 November 2005
17:00

Cambodia	0–1	Thailand
	Report	Tada 45+2'

Paglaum Stadium, Bacolod
29 November 2005
17:00

Philippines	2–4	Malaysia
P. Younghusband 33', 46'	Report	Rudie 14', 86'; Surendran 60', 70'

Panaad Stadium, Bacolod
Attendance: 20,000

==== Group B ====
Pos	Team	Pld	W	D	L	GF	GA	GD	Pts	Qualification
1	Vietnam	4	3	0	1	11	4	+7	9	Advance to knockout stage
2	Indonesia	4	2	2	0	5	0	+5	8	Advance to knockout stage
3	Singapore	4	2	1	1	3	2	+1	7	
4	Laos	4	1	0	3	5	15	−10	3	
5	Myanmar	4	0	1	3	2	5	−3	1	

20 November 2005
16:00

Myanmar	2–3	Laos
Soe Myat Min 27'; Mar La 75'		Davone 12'; Visay 64', 79'

Paglaum Stadium, Bacolod
20 November 2005
18:30

Vietnam	2–1	Singapore
Phạm Văn Quyến 45', 48'	Report 1 Report 2	Shahril 24'

Paglaum Stadium, Bacolod
Referee: Roon-Sang Tossapom (Thailand)

22 November 2005
16:00

Laos	2–8	Vietnam
Davone 19'; Phayvan 30'	Report	Phạm Văn Quyến 8', 20'; Phan Văn Tài Em 15'; Kovan 16' (o.g.); Lê Công Vinh 38', 41', 65'; Lê Tấn Tài 88'

Paglaum Stadium, Bacolod
22 November 2005
18:30

Indonesia	0–0	Myanmar

Paglaum Stadium, Bacolod

24 November 2005
16:00

Singapore	0–0	Indonesia
	Report

Paglaum Stadium, Bacolod
Referee: Kim Dong-Jin (Korea Republic)
24 November 2005
18:30

Myanmar	0–1	Vietnam
	Report	Phan Văn Tài Em 66'

Paglaum Stadium, Bacolod

26 November 2005
16:00

Vietnam	0–1	Indonesia
	Report	Châu Lê Phước Vĩnh 65' (o.g.)

Paglaum Stadium, Bacolod
26 November 2005
18:30

Laos	0–1	Singapore
	Report	Fazrul 4'

Paglaum Stadium, Bacolod

28 November 2005
17:00

Singapore	1–0	Myanmar
Fazrul 43'	Report

Paglaum Stadium, Bacolod
28 November 2005
17:00

Indonesia	4–0	Laos
Salampessy 40'; Zainal 44'; Mahyadi 79'; Indra 84'	Report

Panaad Stadium, Bacolod

=== Knockout stage ===
Semi-finals
December 2
Thailand	3
Indonesia	1
December 2
Vietnam	2
Malaysia	1

Final
December 4
Thailand	3
Vietnam	0
Third place
December 4
Malaysia	1
Indonesia	0

==== Semi-finals ====
2 December 2005
16:00

Thailand	3–1	Indonesia
Teeratep 17' (pen.), 58'; Suree		Johan 60'

Paglaum Stadium, Bacolod

2 December 2005
19:00

Vietnam	2–1	Malaysia
Phạm Văn Quyến 40'; Lê Công Vinh 56'	Report	Nor 34'

Panaad Stadium, Bacolod

==== Bronze medal match ====
4 December 2005
16:00

Malaysia	1–0	Indonesia
Fadzli 78'	Report

Panaad Stadium, Bacolod

==== Gold medal match ====
4 December 2005
19:00

Thailand	3–0	Vietnam
Teeratep 43', 76', 83'	Report

Panaad Stadium, Bacolod

=== Winners ===
2005 SEA Games Men's Tournament
(Thailand)
Thailand
Twelfth title

=== Final ranking ===
Pos	Team	Pld	W	D	L	GF	GA	GD	Pts	Final result
1	Thailand	5	5	0	0	10	2	+8	15	Gold Medal
2	Vietnam	6	4	0	2	13	8	+5	12	Silver Medal
3	Malaysia	5	3	0	2	12	6	+6	9	Bronze Medal
4	Indonesia	6	2	2	2	6	4	+2	8	Fourth place
5	Singapore	4	2	1	1	3	2	+1	7	Eliminated in group stage
6	Philippines (H)	3	1	0	2	6	7	−1	3	Eliminated in group stage
7	Laos	4	1	0	3	5	15	−10	3	Eliminated in group stage
8	Myanmar	4	0	1	3	2	5	−3	1	Eliminated in group stage
9	Cambodia	3	0	0	3	2	10	−8	0	Eliminated in group stage

(H) Hosts

=== Match-fixing controversy ===
Two players from the Vietnamese team, striker Phạm Văn Quyến and midfielder Lê Quốc Vượng, were arrested in Hanoi for "indulging in betting on games and organising betting" (match-fixing). The scandal apparently took place in a match with Vietnam placed against Myanmar, with Vietnam winning 1–0. However, the results are disputed after allegations rose on state television state that some Vietnamese players appeared to slow down their play. It's also been alleged that Van Quyen received 23 million đồng from two women in Ho Chi Minh City on the way to Hanoi from Manila for the match-fix. Meanwhile, the Philippine government praised Vietnamese officials for the crackdown on football corruption and the arrest of the two players. Philippine Olympic Committee chairman Robert Aventajado said that the arrests were made to protect the sport and that Vietnam is working to stem further damage that the scandal has caused to it. Two more players, midfielder Huỳnh Quốc Anh and defender Lê Bật Hiếu, were arrested on the same charges over the same scandal. It is believed that these players also received twenty million đồng from local bookmakers to make sure that Vietnam wouldn't win by more than one goal. The same accusation is also believed to be applied to the 23 million đồng payout to Van Quyen.

== Women's tournament ==
2005 Southeast Asian Games Women's Football
Tournament details
- Host country: Philippines
- Dates: 23 November – 3 December
- Teams: 5
- Venue: 1 (in 1 host city)

Final positions
- Champions: Vietnam (2nd title) (3rd title)
- Runners-up: Myanmar

Tournament statistics
- Matches played: 11
- Goals scored: 35 (3.18 per match)

=== Group stage ===
Due to last-minute withdrawals from Laos, Singapore, and Malaysia, the remaining 5 countries were put into one group.

Team	Pld	W	D	L	GF	GA	GD	Pts
Myanmar	4	4	0	0	11	2	+9	12
Vietnam	4	3	0	1	14	2	+12	9
Thailand	4	2	0	2	4	4	0	6
Philippines	4	1	0	3	4	9	−5	3
Indonesia	4	0	0	4	1	17	−16	0

22 November 2005
16:00

Thailand	2–1	Indonesia
Naphat 48'; Thanatta 68'		Rosmita 65'

Marikina Sports Complex, Marikina
22 November 2005
18:30

Myanmar	1–0	Vietnam
San San Kyu 58'

Marikina Sports Complex, Marikina

24 November 2005
16:00

Indonesia	0–5	Myanmar

Marikina Sports Complex, Marikina
24 November 2005
18:30

Philippines	0–1	Thailand
	Report	Pitsamai 65'

Marikina Sports Complex, Marikina
Attendance: 8,000

26 November 2005
16:00

Thailand	0–1	Vietnam
	Report	Đỗ Hồng Tiến 20'

Marikina Sports Complex, Marikina
26 November 2005
18:30

Philippines	2–0	Indonesia
A. Impelido 30'; Alley 82'	Report

Marikina Sports Complex, Marikina

28 November 2005
16:00

Myanmar	2–1	Thailand
Aye Nandar Hlaing 9'; San San Kyu 58'		Wiphakonwit 47'

Marikina Sports Complex, Marikina
28 November 2005
18:30

Vietnam	5–1	Philippines
Lê Thị Oanh 4', 13', 35', 65'; Văn Thị Thanh 90'		Luto 31'

Marikina Sports Complex, Marikina

30 November 2005
16:00

Philippines	1–3	Myanmar
Impelido 61'		Marlar Win 14', 66', 69'

Marikina Sports Complex, Marikina
30 November 2005
18:30

Vietnam	8–0	Indonesia
Văn Thị Thanh 2', 26'; Đỗ Hồng Tiến 13'; Bùi Thị Tuyết 45'; Bùi Thị Tuyết Mai 57', 87'; Nguyễn Thị Hương 58'; Trần Thị Hồng Nga 69'

Marikina Sports Complex, Marikina

=== Finals ===
3 December 2005
19:00

Myanmar	0–1	Vietnam
		Văn Thị Thanh 69'

Marikina Sports Complex, Marikina

=== Winners ===
2005 SEA Games Women's Tournament

Vietnam
Third title

=== Final ranking ===
Pos	Team	Pld	W	D	L	GF	GA	GD	Pts	Final Result
1	Vietnam	5	4	0	1	15	2	+13	12	Gold Medal
2	Myanmar	5	4	0	1	11	3	+8	12	Silver Medal
3	Thailand	4	2	0	2	4	4	0	6	Bronze Medal
4	Philippines (H)	4	1	0	3	4	9	−5	3	
5	Indonesia	4	0	0	4	1	17	−16	0	

(H) Hosts

== Medal winners ==
Division	Gold	Silver	Bronze
Men's Division	Thailand	Vietnam	Malaysia
Women's Division	Vietnam	Myanmar	Thailand

Preceded by 2003	Football at the SEA Games; 2005 SEA Games	Succeeded by 2007
