= 1986 President Aquino Cup =

Tournament details
- Host country: Philippines
- Dates: August 6–10
- Teams: 4
- Venue: 1 (in 1 host city)

Final positions
- Champions: (Soviet Union) Russian SFSR XI
- Runners-up: (China) Guangdong XI
- Third place: (Hong Kong) South China A.A.
- Fourth place: Philippines

The 1986 President Aquino Cup is a four team tournament held at the Rizal Memorial Stadium in Manila from August 6-10, 1986. The selection team from the Russian Soviet Federative Socialist Republic were champions of the tournament.

The tournament was named in honor of then incumbent President Corazon Aquino. Benigno Aquino III, also known as Noynoy Aquino and the son of the president, was the speaker and guest of honor at the opening of the football tournament held at 17:45 UTC+08:00. Philippine Football Federation president Frank Elizalde delivered the welcome address. Inter-Cities Foundation president Ben Ching introduced the participating teams while Gintong Alay Executive Director Jose Romansanta introduced Noynoy. The ceremonial ball was kicked by Kris Aquino and Asian Ladies Football Federation vice president Cristy Ramos. The tournament was on a single round robin format.

== Participants ==
Four teams participated at the tournament. The hosts Philippines, was represented by its national team. South China A.A. sports club represented the then British colony of Hong Kong. China is represented by a selection from the Guangdong province. The Soviet Union's representative was a selection from ten cities from the Russian Soviet Federative Socialist Republic. The Soviet side's players mostly came from the second division and was mentored by Ivan Ivarlanov who at one time was with the first division.

== Fixtures ==
Times listed are local time (UTC+8)

Team	Pld	W	D	L	GF	GA	GD	Pts
(Soviet Union) Russian SFSR XI	3	3	0	0	7	0	7	6
(China) Guangdong XI	3	2	0	1	3	1	2	4
(Hong Kong) South China	3	1	0	2	5	3	2	2
Philippines	3	0	0	3	1	12	-11	0

August 6, 1986
18:30

Guangdong XI (China)	2–0	Philippines
	Report

Rizal Memorial Stadium, Manila
August 6, 1986
20:30

Russian SFSR XI (Soviet Union)	1–0	(Hong Kong) South China
	Report

Rizal Memorial Stadium, Manila

August 8, 1986

Philippines	0–5	(Soviet Union) Russian SFSR XI
	Report	? 2'

Rizal Memorial Stadium, Manila
Attendance: 5,000
August 8, 1986

Guangdong XI (China)	1–0	(Hong Kong) South China
Huang Junwei 22'	Report

Rizal Memorial Stadium, Manila

August 10, 1986
18:30

Philippines	1–5	(Hong Kong) South China
Villahermosa ?'	Report	Bredbury ?', ?', ?', ?'

Rizal Memorial Stadium, Manila
August 10, 1986
20:30

Russian SFSR XI (Soviet Union)	1–0	(China) Guangdong XI
Mazurin 73'	Report

Rizal Memorial Stadium, Manila
Attendance: 8,000

== Awards ==
1986 President Aquino Cup Champions
(Soviet Union)
Russian SFSR XI
First title
