= Wang Hsiang-huei =

Taiwanese footballer

Personal information
- Date of birth: 28 September 1987 (age 39)
- Place of birth: Taichung, Taiwan
- Height: 1.63 m (5 ft 4 in)
- Position: Midfielder

Team information
- Current team: Hualien
- Number: 8

Senior career*
Years	Team	Apps	(Gls)
- Hualien

International career^{‡}
2008–	Chinese Taipei	35	(7)
- * Club domestic league appearances and goals ‡ National team caps and goals as of 25 November 2022

Wang Hsiang-huei (Chinese: 王湘惠; born 28 September 1987) is a Taiwanese footballer who plays as a midfielder for Taiwan Mulan Football League club Hualien FC, where she serves as its captain, and the Chinese Taipei women's national team.

== International goals ==
Scores and results list Chinese Taipei's goal tally first.

No.	Date	Venue	Opponent	Score	Result	Competition
1.	24 March 2008	Thành Long Stadium, Hồ Chí Minh City, Vietnam	Myanmar	1–0	3–0	2008 AFC Women's Asian Cup qualification
2.	26 August 2009	Tainan County Stadium, Tainan County, Taiwan	Guam	8–0	10–0	2010 EAFF Women's Football Championship
3.	15 September 2014	Incheon Namdong Asiad Rugby Field, Incheon, South Korea	Jordan	2–0	2–2	2014 Asian Games
4.	3 April 2019	Saoud bin Abdulrahman Stadium, Al Wakrah, Qatar	Palestine	2–0	3–0	2020 AFC Women's Olympic Qualifying Tournament
5.	26 January 2022	DY Patil Stadium, Navi Mumbai, India	Iran	5–0	5–0	2022 AFC Women's Asian Cup
6.	11 April 2023	Fouad Chehab Stadium, Jounieh, Lebanon	Indonesia	1–0	4–0	2024 AFC Women's Olympic Qualifying Tournament
