= Lin Ya-hui =

Taiwanese footballer

Personal information
- Date of birth: 27 November 1991 (age 34)
- Place of birth: Tainan City, Taiwan
- Position: Midfielder

Team information
- Current team: Inter Taoyuan

Senior career*
Years	Team	Apps	(Gls)
2019	Taipei Bravo		
2020–	Inter Taoyuan		

International career^{‡}
2019–	Chinese Taipei	4	(0)
2018	Chinese Taipei (futsal)		(2)
- * Club domestic league appearances and goals ‡ National team caps and goals as of 10 February 2020

Lin Ya-hui (Chinese: 林雅惠; born 27 November 1991) is a Taiwanese footballer who plays as a midfielder for Taiwan Mulan Football League club Inter Taoyuan and the Chinese Taipei women's national team.
