= 2008 AFC Women's Asian Cup qualification =

Tournament details
- Dates: 20–27 October 2007 (first round); 24–28 March 2008 (second round)
- Teams: 11 (from 1 confederation)

Tournament statistics
- Matches played: 15

The 2008 AFC Women's Championship qualification is the qualification for the 2008 AFC Women's Asian Cup football competition. The matches were held from 24 to 28 March 2008. The AFC Women's Asian Cup is organised by the Asian Football Confederation.

== First round ==
First leg played on 20 October 2007 in India. Second leg played on 27 October 2007 in Iran

Team 1	Agg	Team 2	1st leg	2nd leg
India	4–5	Iran	3–1	1–4

Both legs played in Hong Kong. First leg on 20 October 2007, second leg on 22 October 2007.

Team 1	Agg	Team 2	1st leg	2nd leg
Hong Kong	3–4	Philippines	2–3	1–1

First leg played on 20 October 2007 in Singapore. Second leg played on 27 October 2007 in Malaysia

Team 1	Agg	Team 2	1st leg	2nd leg
Singapore	1–2	Malaysia	0–2	1–0

=== Matches ===
20 October 2007

India	3–1	Iran
Bembem Devi 14', 78'; Bala Devi 28'	Report	Karimi 8'

Tau Devi Lal Stadium
Gurgaon, India
Attendance: Niu Huijun
27 October 2007

Iran	4–1	India
Mahmoudi ?', ?'; Tarazi ?'; Ghanbari ?'	Report	O. Devi ?'

Ararat Stadium
Teheran, Iran
Referee: Pannipar Kamnueng

Iran won 5–4 on aggregate.

20 October 2007

Hong Kong	2–3	Philippines
Ng ?'; Chan Wing Sze ?'	Report	Albano ?'; Impelido ?'; Agravante ?'

Siu Sai Wan Sports Ground
Siu Sai Wan, Hong Kong
Referee: Kim Mi Ok
22 October 2007

Philippines	1–1	Hong Kong
Eduque ?'	Report	Fung ?'

Siu Sai Wan Sports Ground
Siu Sai Wan, Hong Kong
Referee: Mariko Iwaki

Philippines won 4–3 on aggregate.

20 October 2007

Singapore	0–2	Malaysia
	Report	Oyau ?'; Kais ?'

Jalan Besar Stadium
Kallang, Singapore
Referee: Krystyna Helena Szokolai
27 October 2007

Malaysia	0–1	Singapore
	Report	Lim ?'

Paroi Stadium
Referee: Ri Hong Sil

Malaysia won 2–1 on aggregate.

== Second round ==
=== Group A ===
All matches were played in Ho Chi Minh City, Vietnam

Team	Pts	Pld	W	D	L	GF	GA	GD
Vietnam (H)	9	3	3	0	0	8	2	+6
Chinese Taipei	3	3	1	0	2	6	6	0
Iran	3	3	1	0	2	5	8	−3
Myanmar	3	3	1	0	2	2	5	−3

24 March 2008

Myanmar	0–3	Chinese Taipei
		Wang Hsiang-huei 18'; Lin Yu-hui 60' 81'

Thành Long Stadium

24 March 2008

Vietnam	4–1	Iran
Văn Thị Thanh 20'; Đỗ Thị Ngọc Châm 21' 55'; Bùi Thị Phượng 86'		Hashemi 82'

Thành Long Stadium

26 March 2008

Chinese Taipei	1–3	Vietnam
Kuo Tzu-hui 9' (pen.)		Đỗ Thị Ngọc Châm 6' 22'; Đoàn Thị Kim Chi 51'

Thành Long Stadium

26 March 2008

Iran	1–2	Myanmar
Hashemi 6'		Htwe My Nilar 11' 68'

Thành Long Stadium

28 March 2008

Myanmar	0–1	Vietnam
		Đỗ Thị Ngọc Châm 65'

Thành Long Stadium

28 March 2008

Chinese Taipei	2–3	Iran
Lai Li-chin 21'; Kuo Tzu-hui 39'		Mahmoudi 6' 11' 82'

Thống Nhất Stadium

=== Group B ===
All matches were played in Nakhon Ratchasima, Thailand

Team	Pts	Pld	W	D	L	GF	GA	GD
South Korea	9	3	3	0	0	22	0	+22
Thailand (H)	6	3	2	0	1	20	4	+16
Philippines	1	3	0	1	2	0	13	−13
Malaysia	1	3	0	1	2	0	25	−25

24 March 2008

Thailand	11–0	Malaysia
Pitsamai 24', 28', 30', 56'; Thanatta 40'; Nisa 41', 43', 62', 90'; Sunisa 72'; Kitiya 88'

80th Birthday Stadium

24 March 2008

South Korea	4–0	Philippines
Lee Sae-eun 9', 18', 84' (pen.); Lee Eun-mi 73' (pen.)

80th Birthday Stadium

26 March 2008

Malaysia	0–13	South Korea
		Park Hee-young 18' (pen.), 39'; Yoo Young-a 31', 55', 71'; Lee Eun-Mi 35' (pen.), 84'; Jeon Ga-eul 61', 81', 87', 90'; Han Song-i 68', 79'; Oyao 77' (o.g.)

80th Birthday Stadium

26 March 2008

Philippines	0–9	Thailand
		Anootsara 7'; Nisa 8', 43'; Pitsamai 11', 31', 81'; Thanatta 17', 90+1'; Supaporn 84'

80th Birthday Stadium

28 March 2008

Thailand	0–4	South Korea
		Han Song-i 18', 30'; Lee Eun-mi 25', 38'

80th Birthday Stadium

28 March 2008

Malaysia	0–0	Philippines

Suranaree University of Technology

== Goalscorers ==
7 goals

- (Thailand) Pitsamai Sornsai

6 goals

- (Thailand) Nisa Romyen

5 goals

- (Iran) Bayan Mahmoudi
- (South Korea) Lee Eun-mi
- (Vietnam) Đỗ Thị Ngọc Châm

4 goals

- (South Korea) Han Song-il
- (South Korea) Jeon Ga-eul

3 goals

- (India) Oinam Bembem Devi
- (South Korea) Lee Sae-eun
- (South Korea) Yoo Young-a
- (Thailand) Thanatta Chawong

2 goals

- (Chinese Taipei) Lin Yu-hui
- (Chinese Taipei) Kou Tzu-hui
- (Iran) Mina Hashemi
- (South Korea) Park Hee-young
- (Myanmar) Htwe My Nilar

1 goal

- (Chinese Taipei) Lai Li-chin
- (Chinese Taipei) Wang Hsiang-huei
- (Hong Kong) Pauline Ng
- (Hong Kong) Chan Wing Sze
- (India) Ngangom Bala Devi
- (Iran) Fereshteh Karimi
- (Iran) Sohila Malmooli Tarazi
- (Iran) Zahra Ghanbari
- (Malaysia) Angela Kais
- (Malaysia) Elizabeth Oyau
- (Philippines) Angeline Impelido
- (Philippines) Edna Agravante
- (Philippines) Joanna Marina Eduque Castro
- (Philippines) Merlo Albano
- (Singapore) Lim Shi Ya
- (Thailand) Anootsara Maijarern
- (Thailand) Kitiya Thiangtham
- (Thailand) Sunisa Srangthaisong
- (Thailand) Supaporn Gaewbaen
- (Vietnam) Bùi Thị Phượng
- (Vietnam) Đoàn Thị Kim Chi
- (Vietnam) Văn Thị Thanh

1 own goal

- (Malaysia) Elizabeth Oyao (against South Korea)
