= Pauline Ng (entrepreneur) =

Singaporean skincare Entrepreneur

Pauline Ng (born 1 December 1985) is a Singaporean entrepreneur who founded Porcelain, a skincare business, in 2009. In June 2016 she was the youngest winner of the inaugural Teochew Entrepreneur Award in 2016 presented by DPM Tharman Shamugaratnam, after being selected as one of the BBC's "30 under 30" women in November 2015.

== Biography ==
Ng was born on 1 December 1985 in Singapore. Her mother is a beautician, and her father a retired classical guitar player. At the age of 17, she started her own events company. In 2010, Porcelain surpassed the S$1 million revenue mark, while continuing to push the boundaries. Under Pauline's leadership, Porcelain grew from a team of 2 people to a company with around 100 employees. Ng hired more staff and in developed a line of Porcelain skin care products. By collaborating with facial care firms in the United States, Japan and Taiwan, the range of products was extended. By 2013, the business itself had revenues of US$1 million and was recognized as Asia's Best Luxury Beauty Spa at the World Luxury Spa Awards.
