= Nakhon Sawan Province Stadium =

Stadium in Thailand

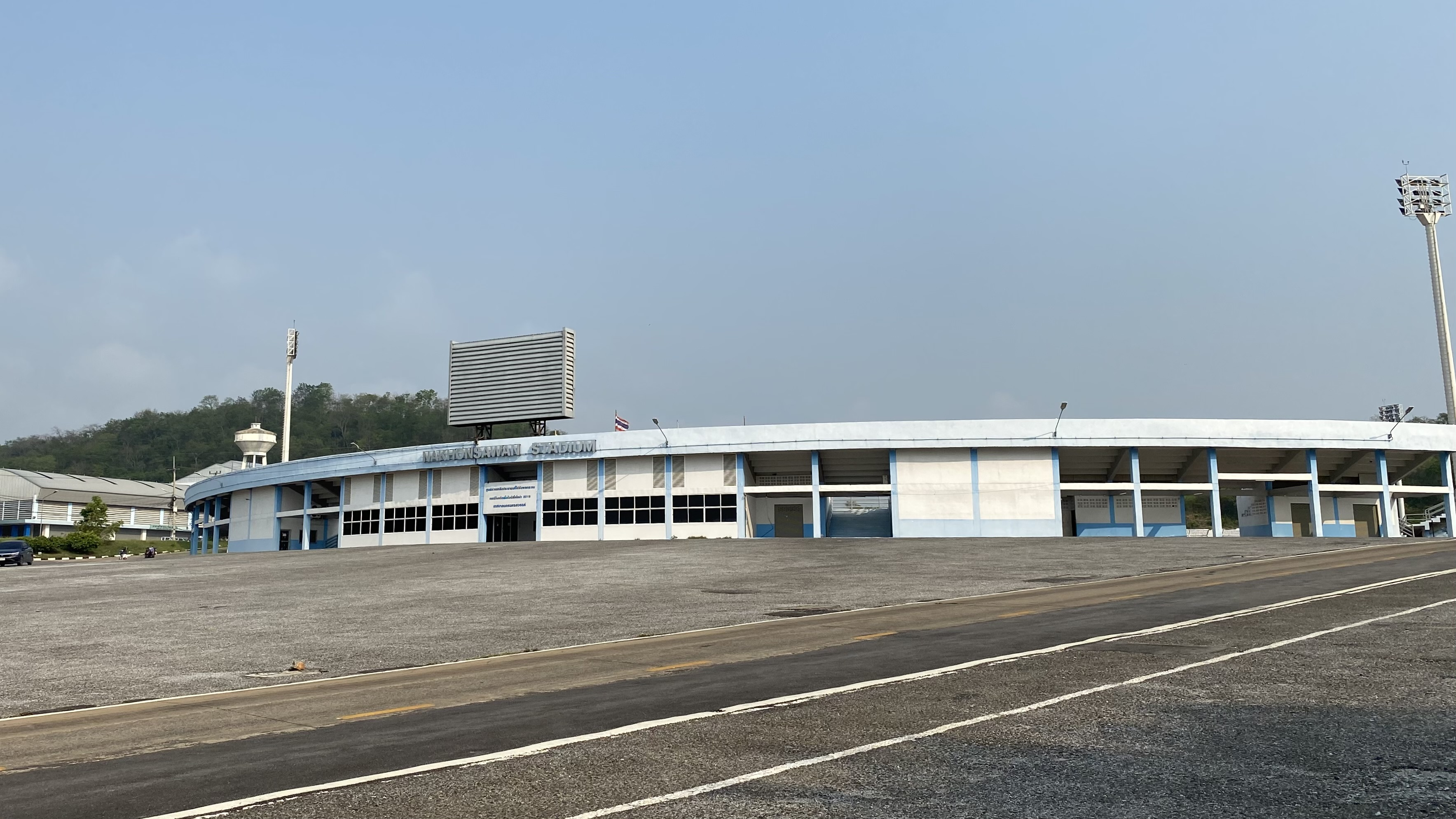
- Interactive map of Nakhon Sawan Province Stadium
- Location: Nakhon Sawan, Thailand
- Coordinates: 15°42′36″N 100°06′24″E
- Capacity: 15,000
- Surface: Grass

Tenant
- Nakhon Sawan F.C. 2010-2011

Nakhon Sawan Province Stadium (Thai: สนามกีฬาจังหวัดนครสวรรค์) is a multi-purpose stadium in Nakhon Sawan, Thailand. It is currently used mostly for staging football matches and is the home stadium of Nakhon Sawan F.C. The stadium holds 15,000 spectators.
