= Chen Hsiao-chuan =

Taiwanese footballer (born 1985)

Personal information
- Full name: Chen Hsiao-chuan (陳曉娟)
- Date of birth: May 18, 1985 (age 41)
- Place of birth: Hualien County, Republic of China (Taiwan)
- Height: 1.65 m (5 ft 5 in)
- Position: Midfielder

Team information
- Current team: Real Valladolid Femenino
- Number: 5

Youth career
- Ming Chuan
- Taiwan PE College

Senior career*
Years	Team	Apps	(Gls)
2010–present	Real Valladolid Femenino		

International career
- Chinese Taipei
- * Club domestic league appearances and goals

Chen Hsiao-chuan (Chinese: 陳曉娟; pinyin: Chén Xiǎojuān; born May 18, 1985, in Hualien, Taiwan) is a Taiwanese female football player. She usually plays as defender.

In April 2010, she passed Real Valladolid Femenino's tryout and signed with the Spanish club with compatriot Tan Wen-lin. Her shirt name is "Rona". She made her debut in a pre-season friendly match against CD Amigos del Duero, in which she scored six goals for RVF. She earns 300 euros a month like her compatriots from Taiwan and because of such a low wage rumors have it she and her compatriots will try to sign for a club that will pay better. Rumors say she recently did a tryout for Real Madrid but did not get accepted.
