= 2006 AFC Women's Asian Cup qualification =

Tournament details
- Dates: 12–20 June 2005
- Teams: 12 (from 1 confederation)

Tournament statistics
- Matches played: 16
- Goals scored: 75 (4.69 per match)

The 2006 AFC Women's Championship qualification is the qualification for the 2006 AFC Women's Asian Cup football competition. All matches were played at the Mỹ Đình National Stadium, Hanoi. The two top teams in each group qualified for the play-off stage. This was the first ever AFC qualifiers for the Women's Asian Cup in the history, having previously only invited teams to take part.

== First round ==
=== Group A ===
Country	GP	W	D	L	GF	GA	Pts
Vietnam	2	2	0	0	7	1	6
Myanmar	2	1	0	1	4	2	3
Philippines	2	0	0	2	2	10	0

12 June 2005

Vietnam	6–1	Philippines
Bùi Thị Tuyết Mai 8'; Đỗ Hồng Tiến 31', 38'; Đoàn Thị Kim Chi 56', 57', 71'		Impelido 70'

Mỹ Đình National Stadium, Hanoi

14 June 2005

Myanmar	4–1	Philippines
Mar Wann 11', 16', ?'; Aye Nandar Hlaing 53' (pen.)		Lazaro 82'

Mỹ Đình National Stadium, Hanoi

16 June 2005

Vietnam	1–0	Myanmar
Đoàn Thị Kim Chi 44' (pen.)

Mỹ Đình National Stadium, Hanoi

=== Group B ===
Country	GP	W	D	L	GF	GA	Pts
Chinese Taipei	2	2	0	0	13	1	6
India	2	1	0	1	11	2	3
Guam	2	0	0	2	0	21	0

12 June 2005

India	10–0	Guam
Sradhanjali Samantaray 23'; Sujata Kar 36', 38', 67', 77', 84'; Pinky Magar 48'; Tababi Devi 50', 53'; Bembem Devi 58'	Report

Mỹ Đình National Stadium, Hanoi

14 June 2005

Chinese Taipei	2–1	India
Lan Mei-fen 19'; Lin Yu-hui 46'	Report	Bembem Devi 36'

Mỹ Đình National Stadium, Hanoi

16 June 2005

Chinese Taipei	11–0	Guam
Lin Yu-hui 7', 11', 18', 50', 57', 86'; Tseng Shu-o 35', 48'; Huang Yu-chen ?' (pen.); Lu Yen-ling ?'; Chuang Shu-mei 88'

Mỹ Đình National Stadium, Hanoi

=== Group C ===
Country	GP	W	D	L	GF	GA	Pts
Uzbekistan	2	2	0	0	9	0	6
Hong Kong	2	1	0	1	4	3	3
Maldives	2	0	0	2	0	10	0

13 June 2005

Uzbekistan	6–0	Maldives
Abdurasulova ?' (pen.), 40'; Mikhailova 47', 57'; Thamheeda 83'; Fazla 90'

Mỹ Đình National Stadium, Hanoi

15 June 2005

Uzbekistan	3–0	Hong Kong
Abdurasulova 20'; Mikhailova 48'; Kosimova 90'

Mỹ Đình National Stadium, Hanoi

17 June 2005

Hong Kong	4–0	Maldives
Law Ka-Lai ?', ?'; Ng Wing Kum 40'; Wong Shuk Fan ?'

Mỹ Đình National Stadium, Hanoi

=== Group D ===
Country	GP	W	D	L	GF	GA	Pts
Thailand	2	2	0	0	9	1	6
Singapore	2	0	1	1	1	5	1
Indonesia	2	0	1	1	0	4	1

13 June 2005

Indonesia	0–0	Singapore

Mỹ Đình National Stadium, Hanoi

15 June 2005

Thailand	5–1	Singapore
Mungkhala 6'; Sornsai 25'; Srangthaisong 48'; 75'; 90+'		Nazreen 45'

Mỹ Đình National Stadium, Hanoi

17 June 2005

Thailand	4–0	Indonesia
Srangthaisong 27'; Peathem 30'; Chawong 32'; Sorsai ?'

Mỹ Đình National Stadium, Hanoi
- Singapore advanced on a coin toss.

== Second round ==
The winners of each match qualified for the main tournament.

19 June 2005

Vietnam	4–1	Hong Kong
Đoàn Thị Kim Chi 40'; Lê Thị Hiền 45+2'; Đỗ Thị Ngọc Châm 55'; Bùi Thị Tuyết Mai 90'		Yau Ka Wai 83'

Mỹ Đình National Stadium, Hanoi

19 June 2005

Chinese Taipei	3–0	Singapore
Lee Ming-shu 19'; Tseng Shu-o 24'; Lin Yu-hui 90'

Mỹ Đình National Stadium, Hanoi

20 June 2005

Uzbekistan	1–2	Myanmar
Mikhailova 24'		Mar Lin Win 63'; Zin Mar Wann 75'

Mỹ Đình National Stadium, Hanoi

20 June 2005

Thailand	3–2	India
Wiphakonwat Suthonthip 23'; Sukunya Peangthem 72'; Pitasamal Sornsai 83'	Report	Sujata Kar 11', 17'

Mỹ Đình National Stadium, Hanoi

== Qualified teams ==
The following four teams qualified for the final tournament.

Team	Qualified as	Qualified on	Previous appearances in AFC Women's Asian Cup^{1}
Vietnam	Second round winners	19 June 2005	3 (1999, 2001, 2003)
Chinese Taipei	Second round winners	19 June 2005	11 (**1977**, **1979**, **1981**, 1989, 1993, 1995, 1997, 1999, 2001)
Myanmar	Second round winners	20 June 2005	1 (2003)
Thailand	Second round winners	20 June 2005	13 (1975, 1977, 1981, **1983**, 1986, 1989, 1991, 1993, 1995, 1997, 1999, 2001, 2003)

Bold indicates champions for that year. Italic indicates hosts for that year.
