= Tan Wen-lin =

Taiwanese footballer (born 1989)

Personal information
- Date of birth: 26 August 1989 (age 37)
- Place of birth: Hualien, Taiwan
- Position: Forward

Team information
- Current team: Hualien

Youth career
- Taiwan PE College

Senior career*
Years	Team	Apps	(Gls)
2010–?	Real Valladolid Femenino		

International career
- Chinese Taipei
- * Club domestic league appearances and goals

Tan Wen-lin (Chinese: 譚汶琳; pinyin: Tán Wènlín; born 26 August 1989), or 'Tan', is a Taiwanese female football player.

In April 2010, she passed Real Valladolid Femenino's tryout and signed with the Spanish club with compatriot Chen Hsiao-chuan. She also had a tryout for Chelsea football club in England, and signed a deal of 1000 euros a month.

== Biography ==
She studied in education Taiwan College of Physical Education. Tan Wen-lin National team

Chinese Taipei Football Player.

Taiwan College of Physical Education

== International goals ==
Scores and results list Chinese Taipei's goal tally first.

No.	Date	Venue	Opponent	Score	Result	Competition
1.	12 November 2014	Hsinchu County Stadium, Zhubei, Taiwan	Hong Kong	1–0	2–0	2015 EAFF Women's East Asian Cup
2.	12 November 2014	Hsinchu County Stadium, Zhubei, Taiwan	Hong Kong	2–0	2–0	2015 EAFF Women's East Asian Cup
