= Tainan Municipal Xinying Stadium =

Multi-purpose stadium in Tainan, Taiwan

Coordinates: 23°19′16″N 120°18′50″E

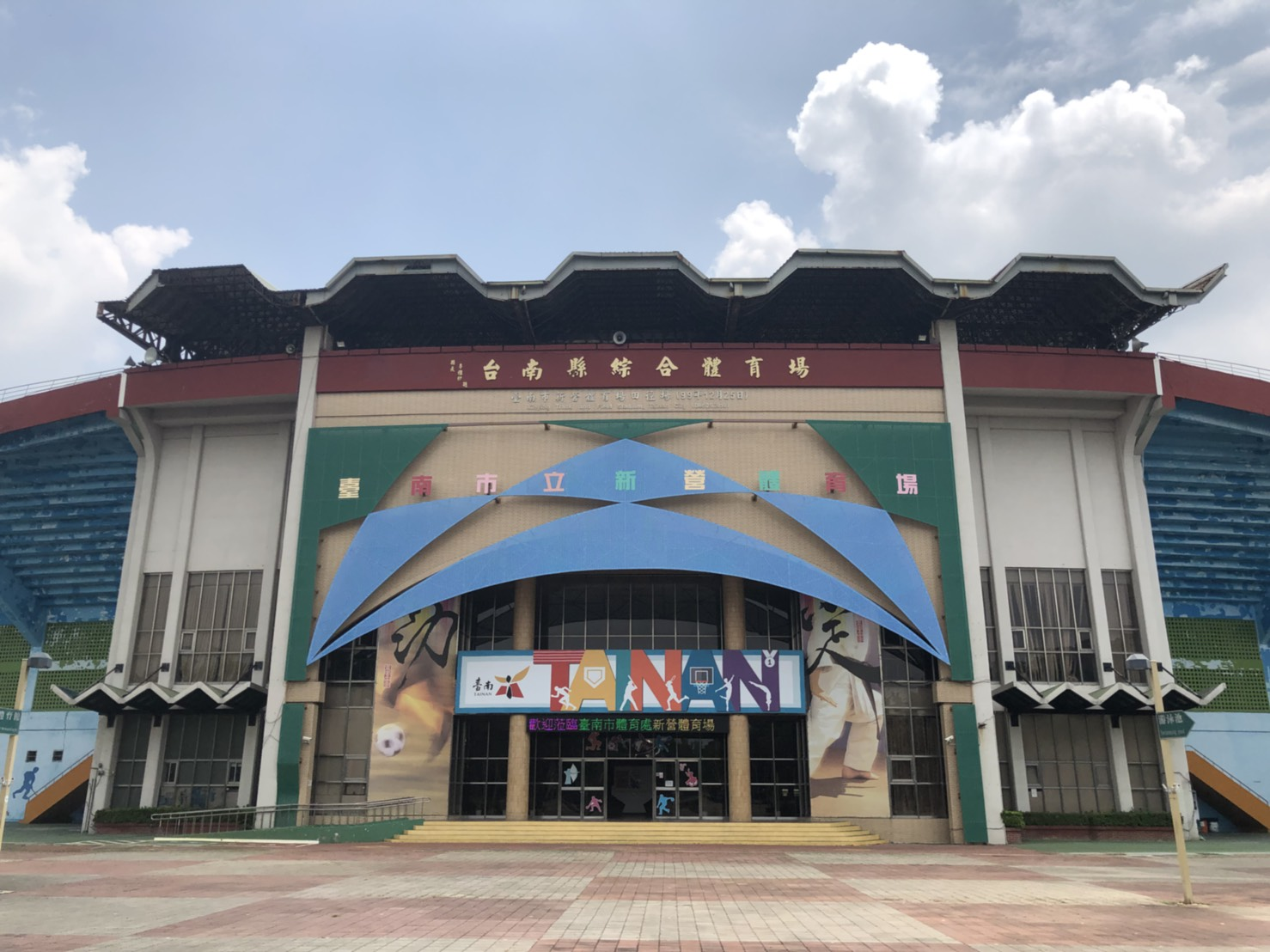
- Interactive map of Tainan Municipal Xinying Stadium
- Location: Tainan, Taiwan
- Owner: Tainan City Government
- Capacity: 30,000
- Surface: Grass

Construction
- Opened: 1998

The Tainan Municipal Xinying Stadium serves as a multi-purpose stadium. It is mostly used for athletics and association football. It was opened in Tainan, Taiwan, in 1998, and has a seating capacity of 30,000 people. It is located in Xinying District, Tainan City and was built by the former Tainan County Government. In addition to the track and field, there are also indoor gymnasiums, badminton halls, swimming pools, tennis courts, softball fields, billiards rooms, judo rooms, fitness centers and other facilities, making it a comprehensive stadium.

== See also ==
- List of stadiums in Taiwan
