= Philippines at the AFC Women's Asian Cup =

The Philippines has competed in eleven editions of the AFC Women's Asian Cup, the top tournament for women's national teams organized by members of the Asian Football Confederation. The Philippine first competed in 1981, when the tournament was still known as the "AFC Women's Championship". The national team competed again in 1983 before skipping the next three editions.

From 1993 to 2003, the Philippines participated in the tournament but failed to progress beyond the group stage. For the 2006 edition the tournament a qualification phase was introduced and the competition was renamed as the "AFC Women's Asian Cup". The Philippines unsuccessfully attempted to qualify for the 2006, 2008, 2014 editions while it did not enter the qualifiers for the 2010 edition.

The Philippines then qualified for the 2018 edition which was hosted in Jordan. In this edition they advanced out of the group stage for the first time and finished sixth. They then qualified for the subsequent 2022 edition in India where they finished as one of the semifinalists – consequentially qualifying for their first ever FIFA Women's World Cup to be held in 2023.

== AFC Women's Championship (1975–2003) ==
=== 1981 in Hong Kong ===
The 1981 AFC Women's Championship which was hosted in Hong Kong, then a British Overseas Territory, marked the Philippines first participation in Asia's top women's national teams tournament. Full matches had a duration of 60 minutes. The Philippine national team was mentored by Edward Magallona and had Cristy Ramos as its captain. They were part of Group A in the group stage together with India, Singapore, and Hong Kong. The national team finished last in their group and failed to advance to the semifinal. They only scoring a single goal while conceding 14 goals in three matches.

7 June 1981

Hong Kong	2−0	Philippines
Wong Mei-Yee 3'; Tao Kwai-Mui 17'

Government Stadium
Attendance: 8,123

10 June 1981

India	8−0	Philippines
Nag (4x); Mullick (2x); Pereira; Ghosh

Mongkok Stadium

12 June 1981

Singapore	4−1	Philippines

Mongkok Stadium
Attendance: 1,200

=== 1983 in Thailand ===
The 1983 AFC Women's Championship which was hosted in Bangkok, Thailand saw six national teams participating. The competing teams were part of a single group in the group stage matches. Though the team failed to qualify at least for the third place play-off, it was in this edition that the Philippines recorded their first win in the history of the tournament by winning 2-0 over Hong Kong. Laudeth Gonzales scored at least a goal in that match.

10 April 1983

India	5−0	Philippines

11 April 1983

Malaysia	1−0	Philippines

12 April 1983

Singapore	5−0	Philippines

14 April 1983

Philippines	2−0	Hong Kong

15 April 1983

Thailand	5−0	Philippines

=== 1993 in Malaysia ===
The Philippines returned to the AFC Women's Asian Championships after not participating in 1986 and 1991. The 1993 edition was hosted in Kuching, Malaysia They were part of Group B with Hong Kong, Japan, and Chinese Taipei. The Philippines finish last in their group conceding 32 goals and did not manage to score a goal. The national team suffered losses with double-digit margins against Japan and Chinese Taipei.

4 December 1993

Hong Kong	5–0	Philippines

6 December 1993

Japan	15–0	Philippines
Kioka; Takakura; Sawa; Nagamine; Mizuma; Handa

8 December 1993

Chinese Taipei	12–0	Philippines

=== 1995 in Malaysia ===
The 1995 edition of the Asian Championships was hosted in Malaysia again; this time in Kota Kinabalu. The Philippines were part of Group A together with China, Hong Kong, and Kazakhstan. The Philippines suffered a 0-21 defeat to China, loss 0-2 to Hong Kong but managed to make a goalless draw with Kazakhstan.

24 September 1995

China	21–0	Philippines

26 September 1995

Kazakhstan	0–0	Philippines

28 September 1995

Hong Kong	2–0	Philippines

=== 1997 in China ===
The 1997 edition was hosted by China with matches of Group B, the grouping which the Philippines was a part of, were played in Guangzhou. The hosts were also part of this group, along with North Korea and Uzbekistan. The Philippines again finished last in their group, conceding 32 goals but scored a goal apiece against North Korea and Uzbekistan.

5 December 1997

Uzbekistan	2–1	Philippines

7 December 1997

North Korea	14–1	Philippines

9 December 1997

China	16–0	Philippines

=== 1999 in the Philippines ===
The Philippines hosted the 1999 AFC Women's Championship with games played in Bacolod and Iloilo City. The host nation played matches in Iloilo City as a team which was part of Group B. They started their campaign with a 5-0 win against Nepal but loss their following matches against Uzbekistan, Japan, and Thailand and finished fourth among five teams in their group just a place ahead of Nepal.

8 November 1999
15:30

Philippines	5–0	Nepal
Camaclang 20', 44'; Karen Cacho 76'; Shella Barlovento 80'; Rachel De los Reyes 90'	Report

Iloilo Sports Complex, Iloilo City
Attendance: 2,000

12 November 1999
15:00

Philippines	0–1	Uzbekistan

Iloilo Sports Complex, Iloilo City

14 November 1999
15:00

Philippines	0–6	Japan
	Report	Isaka 10', 16', 71'; Yamagishi 46'; Aizawa 52'; Hara 63'

Iloilo Sports Complex, Iloilo City

16 November 1999
15:00

Philippines	0–1	Thailand

Iloilo Sports Complex, Iloilo City

=== 2001 in Taiwan ===
The Philippines were grouped with China, Uzbekistan, and Hong Kong in Group B in the tournament hosted in Taiwan. They lost all three games scoring only a single goal against Hong Kong. The opposing teams scored 17 goals against the Philippines.

5 December 2001

Uzbekistan	5–0	Philippines

7 December 2001

Hong Kong	2–1	Philippines

9 December 2001

China	10–0	Philippines

=== 2003 in Thailand ===
Thailand hosted the 2003 AFC Women's Championship and the Philippines were grouped with five teams in Group B. They lost their first three matches against Japan, Myanmar, and Chinese Taipei. Their 2-1 win over Guam was their fourth and final match in this edition.

9 June 2003

Japan	15–0	Philippines

Rajamangala Stadium

11 June 2003

Philippines	0–6	Myanmar

Rajamangala Stadium

13 June 2003

Philippines	0–4	Chinese Taipei

Rajamangala Stadium

17 June 2003

Philippines	2–1	Guam

Rajamangala Stadium

== AFC Women's Asian Cup (2006–) ==
=== 2018 in Jordan ===
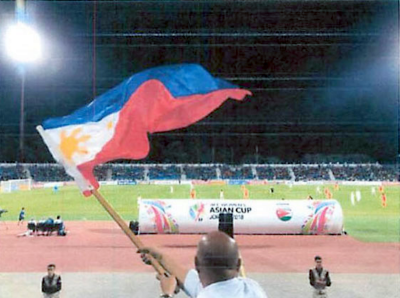
Jordan v. Philippines; 2018 AFC Asian Cup

The Philippines qualified for the AFC Women's Asian Cup for the first time a qualification process was introduced in the tournament which was known as the AFC Women's Championship prior to the 2006 edition.

Group stage – Group A

The national team was part of Group A. They had to finish among the top two teams in their group to advance to the semifinals and qualify for the 2019 FIFA Women's World Cup in France and if they finished third they had to face the third-placing team from the other group for fifth place and the fifth and last berth to qualify for the World Cup. They won 2–1 against hosts Jordan in their first group stage match though they lost their next matches against China and Thailand. They finished third in their group and progressed to the fifth place playoff.

6 April 2018
20:00

Jordan	1–2	Philippines
Jbarah 15'	Report	Khair 51' (o.g.); Bolden 76'

Amman International Stadium, Amman
Attendance: 9,473
Referee: Ri Hyang-ok (North Korea)

9 April 2018
16:45

Philippines	0–3	China
	Report	Li Ying 17', 57'; Ma Jun 31'

King Abdullah II Stadium, Amman
Attendance: 226
Referee: Casey Reibelt (Australia)

12 April 2018
20:00

Thailand	3–1	Philippines
Kanjana 28' (pen.), 53'; Silawan 62'	Report	Shugg 90+3'

King Abdullah II Stadium, Amman
Referee: Oh Hyeon-jeong (South Korea)

Knock-out stage – Fifth place match

They lost 0–5 to South Korea in their last bid to qualify for the 2019 FIFA Women's World Cup.

16 April 2018
20:00

Philippines	0–5	South Korea
	Report	Jang Sel-gi 34'; Lee Min-a 45+3'; Lim Seon-joo 56'; Cho So-hyun 66', 84' (pen.)

Amman International Stadium, Amman
Attendance: 418
Referee: Casey Reibelt (Australia)

=== 2022 in India ===
The Philippines qualified for the 2022 Women's Asian Cup in September 2021. Former Australia coach Alen Stajcic was appointed to lead the national team in the Asian Cup. As part of their preparations, a two month training camp was held in the United States which started in November 2021.

The COVID-19 pandemic was prevailing at the time of the tournament and relevant protocols made some players unavailable for certain matches. Sarina Bolden had to be isolated for the Thailand match due to COVID-19 protocols. Quinley Quezada and Inna Palacios were unavailable for the Australia match, one of which were due to injury and another due to COVID-19 protocols. Coach Stajcic confirmed that some players along with a staff member tested positive for COVID-19 but the identities of these individuals were not explicitly disclosed.

Group stage – Group B

The Philippines were drawn to Group B with Australia, Thailand, and Indonesia. The team started the group stage with an upset 1–0 win against Thailand. It was the Philippines first win against Thailand in twelve matches. This was followed by a 0–4 lost to Australia despite holding the opposition to a scoreless draw at halftime. The Philippines would later take on Indonesia for match day 3 of the group stage. The Philippines shutout Indonesia with a final of 6–0 to advance to the knockout stage quarter finals.

21 January 2022
17:30

Thailand	0–1	Philippines
	Report	C. McDaniel 81'

DY Patil Stadium, Navi Mumbai
Referee: Công Thị Dung (Vietnam)
24 January 2022
15:30

Philippines	0–4	Australia
	Report	Kerr 51'; Randle 53' (o.g.); van Egmond 67'; Fowler 87'

Mumbai Football Arena, Mumbai
Referee: Wang Chieh (Chinese Taipei)
27 January 2022
19:30

Philippines	6–0	Indonesia
Guillou 6'; Bolden 27'; Annis 56', 82'; Miclat 74' (pen.); Cesar 90+4'	Report

Shiv Chhatrapati Sports Complex, Pune
Referee: Kim Yu-jeong (South Korea)

Knockout stage – Quarterfinals

The Philippines was on the verge of qualifying for their first FIFA Women's World Cup. Winning over Chinese Taipei, their quarterfinal opponents, would secure them an outright berth for the 2023 edition which is co-hosted by Australia and New Zealand. Failing to do so would relegate them to the repechage where they could still qualify for the world cup or advance to the inter-confederation play-offs. The Philippines and Chinese Taipei settled for a 1–1 draw and a penalty shoot-out had to be held to determine the team which would advance to the semifinals. The Philippines bested their opposition to clinch a place in the 2023 FIFA Women's World Cup.

30 January 2022
19:30

Chinese Taipei	1–1 (a.e.t.)	Philippines
Zhuo Li-ping 82'	Report	Quezada 49'
Penalties
Ting Chi (penalty scored); Wang Hsiang-huei (penalty scored); Chen Ying-hui (penalty scored); Hsu Yi-yun (penalty missed); Su Hsin-yun (penalty missed); Zhuo Li-ping (penalty missed)	3–4	(penalty scored) S. Castañeda; (penalty scored) Annis; (penalty missed) Miclat; (penalty missed) Long; (penalty scored) O. McDaniel; (penalty scored) Bolden

Shiv Chhatrapati Sports Complex, Pune
Referee: Thein Thein Aye (Myanmar)

Knockout stage – Semifinals

3 February 2022
13:30

South Korea	2–0	Philippines
Cho So-hyun 4'; Son Hwa-yeon 34'	Report

Shiv Chhatrapati Sports Complex, Pune
Referee: Pansa Chaisanit (Thailand)

=== 2026 in Australia ===
The Philippines qualified for the AFC Women's Asian Cup in Australia on 5 July 2025 after winning all three games against Saudi Arabia, Cambodia, and Hong Kong in the qualifiers.

Group stage – Group A

The Philippines were drawn in Group A with the host, South Korea, and Iran.

March 1
17:00 (UTC+8)

Australia	1–0	Philippines
Kerr 14'	Report (AFC); Report (FIFA)

Perth Stadium, Perth
Attendance: 44,379
Referee: Dong Fangyu (China)

March 5
13:00 (UTC+10)

Philippines	0–3	South Korea
	Report (AFC); Report (FIFA)	Jeon Yu-gyeong 12'; Park Soo-jeong 15'; Mun Eun-ju 56'

Gold Coast Stadium, Gold Coast, Australia
Attendance: 2,332
Referee: Lê Thị Ly (Vietnam)

March 8
19:00 (UTC+10)

Iran	0–2	Philippines
	Report (AFC); Report (FIFA)	Eggesvik 29'; C. Mcdaniel 82'

Gold Coast Stadium, Gold Coast
Attendance: 2,384
Referee: Jin Tian (China)

Knockout stage

March 15
16:00 UTC+11

Japan	7–0	Philippines
Tanaka 45'; Koga 45+3', 76'; Chiba 65'; Matsukubo 67'; Tanikawa 86'; Ueki 90'	Report (AFC); Report (FIFA)

Accor Stadium, Sydney
Attendance: 13,321
Referee: Dong Fangyu (China)

Play-in matches

19 March 2026
13:00 UTC+10

Uzbekistan	0–2	Philippines
	Report (AFC); Report (FIFA)	Beard 47'; Sawicki 52'

Gold Coast Stadium, Gold Coast
Attendance: 1,922
Referee: Casey Reibelt (Australia)

== Record ==
=== Tournament summary ===
Final tournament									Qualifying tournament						
Year	Result	GP	W	D*	L	GF	GA	GD	GP	W	D*	L	GF	GA	GD
(Hong Kong) 1981	Group Stage	3	0	0	3	1	14	−13	No qualifying tournament						
(Thailand) 1983	Group Stage	5	1	0	4	2	16	−14	No qualifying tournament						
(Hong Kong) 1986	Did not enter								No qualifying tournament						
(Hong Kong) 1986	Did not enter								No qualifying tournament						
(Japan) 1991	Did not enter								No qualifying tournament						
(Malaysia) 1993	Group Stage	3	0	0	3	0	32	−32	No qualifying tournament						
(Malaysia) 1995	Group Stage	3	0	1	2	0	23	−23	No qualifying tournament						
(China) 1997	Group Stage	3	0	0	3	2	32	−30	No qualifying tournament						
(Philippines) 1999	Group Stage	4	1	0	3	5	8	−3	No qualifying tournament						
(Taiwan) 2001	Group Stage	3	0	0	3	1	17	−16	No qualifying tournament						
(Thailand) 2003	Group Stage	4	1	0	3	2	26	−24	No qualifying tournament						
(Australia) 2006	Did not qualify								2	0	0	2	2	10	-8
(Vietnam) 2008	Did not qualify								5	1	2	2	4	16	-12
(China) 2010	Did not enter								Did not enter						
(Vietnam) 2014	Did not qualify								3	2	0	1	10	1	+9
(Jordan) 2018	6th Place	4	1	0	3	3	12	−9	5	3	1	1	18	6	+12
(India) 2022	Semi-finals	5	2	1	2	8	7	+1	2	2	0	0	4	2	+2
(Australia) 2026	Quarter-finals	5	2	0	4	4	11	-7	3	3	0	0	10	0	+10
Total	11/18	42	8	2	33	28	198	−170	20	11	6	6	48	35	+13

=== Head to head records ===
Legend
Won more than lost
Won equals lost
Lost more than won

Opponent	Pld	W	D	L	GF	GA	GD	Win %
Hong Kong	5	1	0	4	3	11	–8	20.00%
Thailand	4	1	0	3	2	9	–7	25.00%
China	4	0	0	4	0	50	–50	0.00%
Uzbekistan	4	1	0	3	3	8	–5	25.00%
Chinese Taipei	3	0	1	2	1	17	–16	0.00%
Japan	3	0	0	3	0	36	–36	0.00%
South Korea	3	0	0	3	0	10	–10	0.00%
Singapore	2	0	0	2	1	9	–8	0.00%
India	2	0	0	2	0	13	–13	0.00%
Indonesia	1	1	0	0	6	0	+6	100.00%
Nepal	1	1	0	0	5	0	+5	100.00%
Jordan	1	1	0	0	2	1	+1	100.00%
Guam	1	1	0	0	2	1	+1	100.00%
Kazakhstan	1	0	1	0	0	0	0	0.00%
Malaysia	1	0	0	1	0	1	–1	0.00%
Australia	3	0	0	3	0	6	–6	0.00%
Myanmar	1	0	0	1	0	6	–6	0.00%
North Korea	1	0	0	1	1	14	–13	0.00%
Iran	1	1	0	0	2	0	+2	100.00%

== See also ==
- Philippines at the FIFA Women's World Cup
- Philippines at the AFC Asian Cup
