= Philippines women's national football team results (1981–1999) =

- Win Draw Loss

This is a list of the Philippines women's national football team results from 1981 to 1999.

== Results ==
=== 1981 ===
June 7 1981 AFC Women's Championship GS	Hong Kong	2–0	Philippines	Hong Kong
	Wong M.Y. 3'; Tao K.M 17'			Stadium: Government Stadium

June 10 1981 AFC Women's Championship GS	India	8–0	Philippines	Hong Kong
	Nag 4x' Mullick 2x' Pereira; Ghosh			Stadium: Mongkok Stadium

June 12 1981 AFC Women's Championship GS	Singapore	4–1	Philippines	Hong Kong
				Stadium: Mongkok Stadium

October 11 Women's World Invitation Tournament	Mulan Taipei	14–0	Philippines	Taipei, Taiwan
		Report

October 13 Women's World Invitation Tournament	Zwart-Wit '28 (Netherlands)	5–0	Philippines	Taipei, Taiwan
		Report

October 16 Women's World Invitation Tournament	Sting SC (United States)	7–0	Philippines	Kaoshiung, Taiwan
		Report

October 18 Women's World Invitation Tournament	Haiti	7–0	Philippines	Kaoshiung, Taiwan
		Report

=== 1983 ===
April 10 1983 AFC Women's Championship GS	India	5–0	Philippines	Thailand

April 11 1983 AFC Women's Championship GS	Malaysia	1–0	Philippines	Thailand

April 12 1983 AFC Women's Championship GS	Singapore	5–0	Philippines	Thailand

April 14 1983 AFC Women's Championship GS	Philippines	2–0	Hong Kong	Thailand
	Laudeth Gonzalez 11', HT+39'	Report

April 15 1983 AFC Women's Championship GS	Thailand	5–0	Philippines	Thailand

=== 1985 ===
February 9 1985 ASEAN Women's Championship	Malaysia	1–1	Philippines	Kuala Lumpur, Malaysia
		Report		Stadium: Mindef Stadium

February 11 1985 ASEAN Women's Championship	Thailand	8–0	Philippines	Kuala Lumpur, Malaysia
		Report		Stadium: Jalan Raja Muda Stadium

February 13 1985 ASEAN Women's Championship	Singapore	3–0	Philippines	Kuala Lumpur, Malaysia
	Wahab 3x'	Report		Stadium: Jalan Raja Muda Stadium

February 14 1985 ASEAN Women's Championship	Indonesia	3–0	Philippines	Kuala Lumpur, Malaysia
	Tiktik 4'; Atmini 29'; Yuri Maryati 79'	Report		Stadium: Jalan Raja Muda Stadium

=== 1989 ===
January 10 Xiamen women's tournament	Finland	6–0	Philippines	Xiamen, China
		Report

January 12 Xiamen women's tournament	China	9–0	Philippines	Xiamen, China
		Report

January 14 Xiamen women's tournament	Japan	13–0	Philippines	Xiamen, China
		Report

January 16 Xiamen women's tournament	Xiamen (China)	2–0	Philippines	Xiamen, China
		Report

January 18 Xiamen women's tournament	Fujian (China)	3–0	Philippines	Xiamen, China
		Report

=== 1993 ===
December 4 1993 AFC Women's Championship GS	Hong Kong	5–0	Philippines	Kuching, Malaysia
	Chan Suk Chi 5' (pen.); Yau Ka Wai 50'; Ho Wing Kam 55'; Lee Lai Ho 60'; Chan Shuk Chi 75'	Report		Stadium: Sarawak State Stadium

December 6 1993 AFC Women's Championship GS	Japan	15–0	Philippines	Kuching, Malaysia

December 8 1993 AFC Women's Championship GS	Chinese Taipei	12–0	Philippines	Kuching, Malaysia
		Report

=== 1995 ===
September 24 1995 AFC Women's Championship	China	21–0	Philippines	Kota Kinabalu, Malaysia

September 26 1995 AFC Women's Championship	Kazakhstan	0–0	Philippines	Kota Kinabalu, Malaysia

September 28 1995 AFC Women's Championship	Hong Kong	2–0	Philippines	Kota Kinabalu, Malaysia

=== 1997 ===
December 5 1997 AFC Women's Championship	Uzbekistan	2–1	Philippines	Guangdong, China

December 7 1997 AFC Women's Championship	North Korea	14–1	Philippines	Guangdong, China

December 9 1997 AFC Women's Championship	China	16–0	Philippines	Guangdong, China

=== 1999 ===
November 8 1999 AFC Women's Championship	Philippines	5–0	Nepal	Iloilo City, Philippines
	Camaclang 20', 44'; Cacho 76'; Barlovento 80'; De los Reyes 90'	Report		Stadium: Iloilo Sports Complex; Attendance: 2,000

November 12 1999 AFC Women's Championship	Philippines	0–1	Uzbekistan	Iloilo City, Philippines
				Stadium: Iloilo Sports Complex

November 14 1999 AFC Women's Championship	Philippines	0–6	Japan	Iloilo City, Philippines
		Report	Isaka 10', 16', 71'; Yamagishi 46'; Aizawa 52'; Hara 63'	Stadium: Iloilo Sports Complex

November 16 1999 AFC Women's Championship	Philippines	0–1	Thailand	Iloilo City, Philippines
				Stadium: Iloilo Sports Complex

== See also ==
- Philippines women's national football team results
- Philippines women's national football team results (2000–2009)
- Philippines women's national football team results (2010–2019)
- Philippines women's national football team results (2020–present)
