= 2022 AFC Women's Asian Cup qualification =

Tournament details
- Host countries: Bahrain (Group A); Tajikistan (Groups B and C); Kyrgyzstan (Group D); Uzbekistan (Groups E, F and G); Palestine (Group H)
- Dates: 17–29 September, 18–24 October 2021
- Teams: 24 (from 1 confederation)
- Venues: 7 (in 5 host cities)

Tournament statistics
- Matches played: 26
- Goals scored: 113 (4.35 per match)
- Attendance: 1,194 (46 per match)
- Top scorer: (Vietnam) Phạm Hải Yến (8 goals)

The 2022 AFC Women's Asian Cup qualification was the qualification tournament for the 2022 AFC Women's Asian Cup.

A total of twelve teams qualified to play in the final tournament in India. The host country India and the top three teams of the previous tournament in 2018 qualified automatically, while the other eight teams were decided by qualification, with the matches played between 17 and 29 September and 18–24 October 2021 in centralised venues.

This tournament also served as the first stage of Asian qualification for the 2023 FIFA Women's World Cup, where five teams from the Women's Asian Cup qualify directly for the World Cup (plus co-hosts Australia), and two teams qualify for a 10-team playoff tournament.

== Draw ==
The Northern Mariana Islands, whose association became the 47th full AFC member during the confederation's 30th Congress on 9 December 2020, were eligible to enter the qualification tournament, but did not participate. They are not FIFA members and thus would not be eligible to qualify for the 2023 Women's World Cup.

Originally, the draw was to be held on 27 May 2021, 15:30 MST (UTC+8), at the Asian Football Confederation (AFC) House in Kuala Lumpur, Malaysia. However, due to rising cases of COVID-19 across Asia, the AFC decided to postpone the original draw date until further notice. On 23 June, the confederation announced the seeding and the date for the draw, which was held on 24 June, 16:30 MYT (UTC+8), at the AFC House. The 28 teams were drawn into four groups of four teams and four groups of three teams.

The teams were seeded according to their performance in the 2018 AFC Women's Asian Cup final tournament and qualification (overall ranking shown in parentheses). The following restrictions were also applied:

- The seven teams which indicated their intention to serve as qualification group hosts prior to the draw were drawn into separate groups.
- These host countries were allocated to positions in each group according to their ranking:
  - Chinese Taipei and Myanmar in position 1
  - Tajikistan and Uzbekistan in position 2
  - Bangladesh, Indonesia, and Nepal in position 4 (if drawn in Group A–D) or position 3 (if drawn in Group E–G)

Automatically qualified for final tournament and not participating in qualification
1. **India** (18) (as final tournament hosts); 2. **Japan** (1); 3. **Australia** (2); 4. **China** (3)
Participating in qualification
| Pot 1 | Pot 2 | Pot 3 | Pot 4 (unranked) |
| 5. **Thailand** (4); 6. **South Korea** (5); 7. **Philippines** (6); 8. Jordan (7); 9. **Vietnam** (8); 10. North Korea (9) **(W)**; 11. **Chinese Taipei** (10) **~~(H)~~**; 12. **Myanmar** (11) **~~(H)~~** | 13. Bahrain (12) **(H)***; 14. **Iran** (13); 15. Uzbekistan (14) **(H)**; 16. Palestine (15) **(H)***; 17. United Arab Emirates (16); 18. Singapore (17); 19. Hong Kong (19); 20. Tajikistan (20) **(H)** | 21. Iraq (21) **(W)** | 22. Afghanistan (NR) **(W)**; 23. Bangladesh (NR) **~~(H)~~**; 24. Guam (NR); 25. **Indonesia** (NR) **~~(H)~~**; 26. Laos (NR); 27. Lebanon (NR) **~~(H)*~~**; 28. Malaysia (NR); 29. Maldives (NR); 30. Mongolia (NR); 31. Nepal (NR) **~~(H)~~**; 32. Turkmenistan (NR) **(W)** |

Notes

- Teams in **bold** qualified for the final tournament.
- (H): Qualification group hosts determined before the draw
- (H)*: Qualification group hosts determined after the draw
- (NR): Non-ranked
- (W): Withdrew after draw

Did not enter

- Bhutan
- Brunei
- Cambodia
- Kuwait
- Kyrgyzstan **(H)***
- Macau (withdrew prior to draw)
- Northern Mariana Islands
- Oman
- Pakistan (suspended)
- Qatar
- Saudi Arabia
- Sri Lanka
- Syria
- Timor-Leste
- Yemen

== Groups ==
The matches were played during the windows of 16–29 September and 18–24 October 2021.

Schedule
| Matchday | Group B | | Group C | | Groups E–H | | Group A | | Group D | |
| Matchday | Dates | Matches | Dates | Matches | Dates | Matches | Dates | Matches | Dates | Matches |
|---|---|---|---|---|---|---|---|---|---|---|
| Matchday 1 | 23 September 2021 | 1 v 3 | 24 September 2021 | 2 v 1 | 17–19 September 2021 | 3 v 1 | 18 October 2021 | 3 v 1 | 18 October 2021 | 2 v 3, 1 v 4 |
| Matchday 2 | 26 September 2021 | 2 v 3 | 27 September 2021 | 1 v 2 | 20–22 September 2021 | 2 v 3 | 21 October 2021 | 2 v 3 | 21 October 2021 | 3 v 1, 4 v 2 |
| Matchday 3 | 29 September 2021 | 1 v 2 | — | — | 23–25 September 2021 | 1 v 2 | 24 October 2021 | 1 v 2 | 24 October 2021 | 3 v 4, 1 v 2 |

Tiebreakers

Teams are ranked according to points (3 points for a win, 1 point for a draw, 0 points for a loss), and if tied on points, the following tiebreaking criteria are applied, in the order given, to determine the rankings (Regulations Article 7.3):

1. Points in head-to-head matches among tied teams;
2. Goal difference in head-to-head matches among tied teams;
3. Goals scored in head-to-head matches among tied teams;
4. If more than two teams are tied, and after applying all head-to-head criteria above, a subset of teams are still tied, all head-to-head criteria above are reapplied exclusively to this subset of teams;
5. Goal difference in all group matches;
6. Goals scored in all group matches;
7. Penalty shoot-out if only two teams are tied and they met in the last round of the group;
8. Disciplinary points (yellow card = 1 point, red card as a result of two yellow cards = 3 points, direct red card = 3 points, yellow card followed by direct red card = 4 points);
9. Drawing of lots.

=== Group A ===
- Chinese Taipei was originally to host the group, but it was changed due to the activity limitations imposed on foreign teams in Taiwan. On 15 September, Bahrain was confirmed as the Group hosts.
- Times listed are UTC+3.

| Pos | Team | Pld | W | D | L | GF | GA | GD | Pts | Qualification |
|---|---|---|---|---|---|---|---|---|---|---|
| 1 | Chinese Taipei | 2 | 2 | 0 | 0 | 6 | 0 | +6 | 6 | Final tournament |
| 2 | Bahrain (H) | 2 | 0 | 1 | 1 | 0 | 2 | −2 | 1 | |
| 3 | Laos | 2 | 0 | 1 | 1 | 0 | 4 | −4 | 1 | |
| 4 | Turkmenistan | 0 | 0 | 0 | 0 | 0 | 0 | 0 | 0 | Withdrew (Note: Turkmenistan withdrew on 6 August from the competition due to travel restrictions related to the COVID-19 pandemic.) |

Source: AFC
Rules for classification: Qualification tiebreakers
(H) Hosts
Notes:
18 October 2021
18:00

| Laos | 0–4 | Chinese Taipei |
|---|---|---|
| | Report (FIFA); Report (AFC) | Chen Yen-ping 19'; Su Yu-hsuan 33'; Lai Li-chin 55', 60' |

Khalifa Sports City Stadium, Isa Town
Attendance: 85
Referee: Doumouh Al-Bakkar (Lebanon)

21 October 2021
18:00

| Bahrain | 0–0 | Laos |
|---|---|---|
| | Report (FIFA); Report (AFC) |

Khalifa Sports City Stadium, Isa Town
Attendance: 302
Referee: Haneed Murad (Jordan)

24 October 2021
18:00

| Chinese Taipei | 2–0 | Bahrain |
|---|---|---|
| Lai Li-chin 60'; Chen Yen-ping 77' | Report (FIFA); Report (AFC) |

Khalifa Sports City Stadium, Isa Town
Attendance: 257
Referee: Sunita Thongthawin (Thailand)

=== Group B ===
- All matches were held in Tajikistan.
- Times listed are UTC+5.

| Pos | Team | Pld | W | D | L | GF | GA | GD | Pts | Qualification |
|---|---|---|---|---|---|---|---|---|---|---|
| 1 | Vietnam | 2 | 2 | 0 | 0 | 23 | 0 | +23 | 6 | Final tournament |
| 2 | Tajikistan (H) | 2 | 1 | 0 | 1 | 4 | 7 | −3 | 3 | |
| 3 | Maldives | 2 | 0 | 0 | 2 | 0 | 20 | −20 | 0 | |
| 4 | Afghanistan | 0 | 0 | 0 | 0 | 0 | 0 | 0 | 0 | Withdrew (Note: Afghanistan withdrew in September 2021. The team's participation was uncertain due to the Taliban takeover of the country.) |

Source: AFC
Rules for classification: Qualification tiebreakers
(H) Hosts
Notes:
23 September 2021
18:00

| Maldives | 0–16 | Vietnam |
|---|---|---|
| | Report (FIFA); Report (AFC) | Nguyễn Thị Thanh Nhã 11', 62'; Haneefa 13' (o.g.); Nguyễn Thị Tuyết Dung 16', 65'; Nguyễn Thị Tuyết Ngân 33'; Trần Thị Thùy Trang 41'; Chương Thị Kiều 50'; Phạm Hải Yến 51', 58', 67', 73', 79', 84'; Huỳnh Như 56'; Hồ Thị Quỳnh 82' |

Pamir Stadium, Dushanbe
Attendance: 0
Referee: Mahsa Ghorbani (Iran)

26 September 2021
18:00

| Tajikistan | 4–0 | Maldives |
|---|---|---|
| Khalimova 2', 24'; Khudododova 14'; Sotnikova 58' | Report (FIFA); Report (AFC) |

Pamir Stadium, Dushanbe
Attendance: 300
Referee: Kim Yu-jeong (South Korea)

29 September 2021
18:00

| Vietnam | 7–0 | Tajikistan |
|---|---|---|
| Phạm Hải Yến 14', 73'; Nguyễn Thị Bích Thùy 42', 54'; Huỳnh Như 51' (pen.); Hoàng Thị Loan 84'; Nguyễn Thị Vạn 90' | Report (FIFA); Report (AFC) |

Pamir Stadium, Dushanbe
Attendance: 250
Referee: Pansa Chaisanit (Thailand)

=== Group C ===
- Both matches were held in Tajikistan.
- Times listed are UTC+5.

| Pos | Team | Pld | W | D | L | GF | GA | GD | Pts | Qualification |
|---|---|---|---|---|---|---|---|---|---|---|
| 1 | Indonesia | 2 | 2 | 0 | 0 | 2 | 0 | +2 | 6 | Final tournament |
| 2 | Singapore | 2 | 0 | 0 | 2 | 0 | 2 | −2 | 0 | |
| 3 | Iraq | 0 | 0 | 0 | 0 | 0 | 0 | 0 | 0 | Withdrew (Note: North Korea withdrew on 29 July from the competition due to safety concerns related to the COVID-19 pandemic. Iraq did the same on 8 September.) |
| 4 | North Korea | 0 | 0 | 0 | 0 | 0 | 0 | 0 | 0 | Withdrew |

Source: AFC
Rules for classification: Qualification tiebreakers
Notes:
24 September 2021
18:00

| Singapore | 0–1 | Indonesia |
|---|---|---|
| | Report (FIFA); Report (AFC) | Baiq 4' |

Pamir Stadium, Dushanbe
Attendance: 0
Referee: Lee Yi-chi (Chinese Taipei)

27 September 2021
18:00

| Indonesia | 1–0 | Singapore |
|---|---|---|
| Octavianti 30' | Report (FIFA); Report (AFC) |

Pamir Stadium, Dushanbe
Attendance: 0
Referee: Choki Om (Bhutan)

=== Group D ===
- All matches were originally to be held in Lebanon. On 15 September, Kyrgyzstan was confirmed as the group hosts.
- Times listed are UTC+6.

| Pos | Team | Pld | W | D | L | GF | GA | GD | Pts | Qualification |
|---|---|---|---|---|---|---|---|---|---|---|
| 1 | Myanmar | 3 | 3 | 0 | 0 | 14 | 0 | +14 | 9 | Final tournament |
| 2 | Lebanon | 3 | 2 | 0 | 1 | 4 | 4 | 0 | 6 | |
| 3 | United Arab Emirates | 3 | 1 | 0 | 2 | 2 | 4 | −2 | 3 | |
| 4 | Guam | 3 | 0 | 0 | 3 | 1 | 13 | −12 | 0 | |

Source: AFC
Rules for classification: Qualification tiebreakers
18 October 2021
12:00

| Myanmar | 4–0 | Lebanon |
|---|---|---|
| Win Theingi Tun 24' (pen.); Myat Noe Khin 64'; San Thaw Thaw 86'; July Kyaw 90+3' | Report (FIFA); Report (AFC) |

Dolen Omurzakov Stadium, Bishkek
Attendance: 0
Referee: Wang Chieh (Chinese Taipei)
18 October 2021
17:00

| United Arab Emirates | 2–1 | Guam |
|---|---|---|
| Ibrahim 38'; N. Al-Adwan 81' (pen.) | Report (FIFA); Report (AFC) | Talledo 28' |

Dolen Omurzakov Stadium, Bishkek
Attendance: 0
Referee: Nodira Mirzoeva (Tajikistan)

21 October 2021
12:00

| Lebanon | 1–0 | United Arab Emirates |
|---|---|---|
| Salha 48' | Report (FIFA); Report (AFC) |

Dolen Omurzakov Stadium, Bishkek
Attendance: 0
Referee: Park Se-jin (South Korea)
21 October 2021
17:00

| Guam | 0–8 | Myanmar |
|---|---|---|
| | Report (FIFA); Report (AFC) | Win Theingi Tun 4', 37'; Myat Noe Khin 14'; Khin Mo Mo Tun 50'; San Thaw Thaw 53', 85'; Pont Pont Pyae Maung 90'; July Kyaw 90+3' |

Dolen Omurzakov Stadium, Bishkek
Attendance: 0
Referee: Saltanat Noroozi (Iran)

24 October 2021
12:00

| Myanmar | 2–0 | United Arab Emirates |
|---|---|---|
| Khin Mo Mo Tun 4'; Chit Chit 23' | Report (FIFA); Report (AFC) |

Dolen Omurzakov Stadium, Bishkek
Attendance: 0
Referee: Veronika Bernatskaia (Kyrgyzstan)
24 October 2021
17:00

| Guam | 0–3 | Lebanon |
|---|---|---|
| | Report (FIFA); Report (AFC) | Tamim 28', 60'; Iskandar 47' |

Dolen Omurzakov Stadium, Bishkek
Attendance: 0
Referee: Wang Chieh (Chinese Taipei)

=== Group E ===
- All matches were held in Uzbekistan.
- Times listed are UTC+5.

| Pos | Team | Pld | W | D | L | GF | GA | GD | Pts | Qualification |
|---|---|---|---|---|---|---|---|---|---|---|
| 1 | South Korea | 2 | 2 | 0 | 0 | 16 | 0 | +16 | 6 | Final tournament |
| 2 | Uzbekistan (H) | 2 | 1 | 0 | 1 | 12 | 4 | +8 | 3 | |
| 3 | Mongolia | 2 | 0 | 0 | 2 | 0 | 24 | −24 | 0 | |

Source: AFC
Rules for classification: Qualification tiebreakers
(H) Hosts
17 September 2021
16:00

| Mongolia | 0–12 | South Korea |
|---|---|---|
| | Report (FIFA); Report (AFC) | Choo Hyo-joo 4', 44'; Cho So-hyun 24', 54'; Lee Geum-min 30', 41'; Lee Min-a 32'; Ji So-yun 34'; Moon Mi-ra 67', 81', 89'; Park Ye-eun 88' |

Pakhtakor Stadium, Tashkent
Attendance: 0
Referee: Asaka Koizumi (Japan)

20 September 2021
16:00

| Uzbekistan | 12–0 | Mongolia |
|---|---|---|
| Karachik 15'; Khabibullaeva 20', 23', 53'; Kudratova 27', 60'; Altansukh 31' (o.g.); Sarikova 47', 63', 83'; Galimova 71'; Shoyimova 75' | Report (FIFA); Report (AFC) |

Pakhtakor Stadium, Tashkent
Attendance: 0
Referee: Ranjita Devi Tekcham (India)

23 September 2021
16:00

| South Korea | 4–0 | Uzbekistan |
|---|---|---|
| Kamoltoeva 17' (o.g.); Choe Yu-ri 51'; Moon Mi-ra 88', 90+4' | Report (FIFA); Report (AFC) |

Pakhtakor Stadium, Tashkent
Attendance: 0
Referee: Veronika Bernatskaia (Kyrgyzstan)

=== Group F ===
- Nepal was originally to host the group. Tashkent, Uzbekistan was announced as the replacement host.
- Times listed are UTC+5.

| Pos | Team | Pld | W | D | L | GF | GA | GD | Pts | Qualification |
|---|---|---|---|---|---|---|---|---|---|---|
| 1 | Philippines | 2 | 2 | 0 | 0 | 4 | 2 | +2 | 6 | Final tournament |
| 2 | Hong Kong | 2 | 0 | 1 | 1 | 1 | 2 | −1 | 1 (Note: Hong Kong and Nepal are tied in rankings (Disciplinary point: Hong Kong 0, Nepal 0)) | |
| 2 | Nepal | 2 | 0 | 1 | 1 | 1 | 2 | −1 | 1 | |

Source: AFC
Rules for classification: Qualification tiebreakers
Notes:
18 September 2021
15:00

| Nepal | 1–2 | Philippines |
|---|---|---|
| Chaudhary 10' | Report (FIFA); Report (AFC) | Annis 90'; Wilson 90+2' |

JAR Stadium, Tashkent
Attendance: 0
Referee: Anna Sidorova (Uzbekistan)

21 September 2021
15:00

| Hong Kong | 0–0 | Nepal |
|---|---|---|
| | Report (FIFA); Report (AFC) |

JAR Stadium, Tashkent
Attendance: 0
Referee: Doumouh Al-Bakkar (Lebanon)

24 September 2021
15:00

| Philippines | 2–1 | Hong Kong |
|---|---|---|
| Annis 17'; C. McDaniel 87' | Report (FIFA); Report (AFC) | Chung Pui Ki 61' |

JAR Stadium, Tashkent
Attendance: 0
Referee: Asaka Koizumi (Japan)

=== Group G ===
- Bangladesh was originally to host the group, but considered a withdrawal from hosting due to COVID-19 pandemic in the country. The AFC announced Uzbekistan as the replacement host.

| Pos | Team | Pld | W | D | L | GF | GA | GD | Pts | Qualification |
|---|---|---|---|---|---|---|---|---|---|---|
| 1 | Iran | 2 | 1 | 1 | 0 | 5 | 0 | +5 | 4 (Note: Penalty shoot-out: Jordan 2–4 Iran) | Final tournament |
| 2 | Jordan | 2 | 1 | 1 | 0 | 5 | 0 | +5 | 4 | |
| 3 | Bangladesh | 2 | 0 | 0 | 2 | 0 | 10 | −10 | 0 | |

Source: AFC
Rules for classification: Qualification tiebreakers
Notes:
19 September 2021
15:00

| Bangladesh | 0–5 | Jordan |
|---|---|---|
| | Report (FIFA); Report (AFC) | Jebreen 35'; Al-Bitar 45'; Jbarah 62', 67', 77' |

Milliy Stadium, Tashkent
Attendance: 0
Referee: Oh Hyeon-jeong (South Korea)

22 September 2021
15:00

| Iran | 5–0 | Bangladesh |
|---|---|---|
| Motevalli 4'; Khosravi 14'; Taherkhani 31' (pen.), 61' (pen.); Dabbaghi 55' | Report (FIFA); Report (AFC) |

Milliy Stadium, Tashkent
Attendance: 0
Referee: Edita Mirabidova (Uzbekistan)

25 September 2021
15:00

| Jordan | 0–0 | Iran |
|---|---|---|
| | Report (FIFA); Report (AFC) |
Penalties
| Al-Majali (penalty scored); Al-Bitar (penalty missed); Fraij (penalty scored); Al-Masri (penalty missed) | 2–4 | (penalty scored) Taherkhani; (penalty scored) Motevalli; (penalty scored) Ghanbari; (penalty scored) Sadeghi |

Milliy Stadium, Tashkent
Attendance: 0
Referee: Ranjita Devi Tekcham (India)

=== Group H ===
- All matches were held in Palestine.
- Times listed are UTC+2:00.

| Pos | Team | Pld | W | D | L | GF | GA | GD | Pts | Qualification |
|---|---|---|---|---|---|---|---|---|---|---|
| 1 | Thailand | 2 | 2 | 0 | 0 | 11 | 0 | +11 | 6 | Final tournament |
| 2 | Malaysia | 2 | 1 | 0 | 1 | 2 | 4 | −2 | 3 | |
| 3 | Palestine (H) | 2 | 0 | 0 | 2 | 0 | 9 | −9 | 0 | |

Source: AFC
Rules for classification: Qualification tiebreakers
(H) Hosts
19 September 2021
15:30

| Malaysia | 0–4 | Thailand |
|---|---|---|
| | Report (FIFA); Report (AFC) | Kanyanat 1', 37', 90+2'; Nutwadee 2' |

Faisal Al-Husseini International Stadium, Al-Ram
Attendance: 0
Referee: Cha Min-ji (South Korea)

22 September 2021
15:30

| Palestine | 0–2 | Malaysia |
|---|---|---|
| | Report (FIFA); Report (AFC) | Andrea Lee 57'; Steffi 82' |

Faisal Al-Husseini International Stadium, Al-Ram
Attendance: 0
Referee: Esra'a Al-Mbaidin (Jordan)

25 September 2021
15:30

| Thailand | 7–0 | Palestine |
|---|---|---|
| Janista 45+2', 90+6'; Silawan 45+5', 76'; Irravadee 47', 52', 82' | Report (FIFA); Report (AFC) |

Faisal Al-Husseini International Stadium, Al-Ram
Attendance: 0
Referee: Jhesa Kaatz (Philippines)

== Qualified teams ==
The following 12 teams qualified for the final tournament.

| Team | Qualified as | Qualified on | Previous appearances in AFC Women's Asian Cup^{1} |
|---|---|---|---|
| India | Hosts | 5 June 2020 | 8 (1979, 1981, 1983, 1995, 1997, 1999, 2001, 2003) |
| Japan | 2018 champions | 28 January 2021 | 16 (1977, 1981, 1986, 1989, 1991, 1993, 1995, 1997, 1999, 2001, 2003, 2006, 2008, 2010, **2014**, **2018**) |
| Australia | 2018 runners-up | 28 January 2021 | 7 (1975, 1979, 2006, 2008, **2010**, 2014, 2018) |
| China | 2018 third place | 28 January 2021 | 14 (**1986**, **1989**, **1991**, **1993**, **1995**, **1997**, **1999**, 2001, 2003, **2006**, 2008, 2010, 2014, 2018) |
| Chinese Taipei | Group A winners | 24 October 2021 | 13 (**1977**, **1979**, **1981**, 1989, 1991, 1993, 1995, 1997, 1999, 2001, 2003, 2006, 2008) |
| Vietnam | Group B winners | 29 September 2021 | 8 (1999, 2001, 2003, 2006, 2008, 2010, 2014, 2018) |
| Indonesia | Group C winners | 27 September 2021 | 4 (1977, 1981, 1986, 1989) |
| Myanmar | Group D winners | 24 October 2021 | 4 (2003, 2006, 2010, 2014) |
| South Korea | Group E winners | 23 September 2021 | 12 (1991, 1993, 1995, 1997, 1999, 2001, 2003, 2006, 2008, 2010, 2014, 2018) |
| Philippines | Group F winners | 24 September 2021 | 9 (1981, 1983, 1993, 1995, 1997, 1999, 2001, 2003, 2018) |
| Iran | Group G winners | 25 September 2021 | 0 (Debut) |
| Thailand | Group H winners | 25 September 2021 | 16 (1975, 1977, 1981, **1983**, 1986, 1989, 1991, 1995, 1999, 2001, 2003, 2006, 2008, 2010, 2014, 2018) |

^{1} Bold indicates champions for that year. Italic indicates hosts for that year.

== Goalscorers ==
There were 113 goals scored in 26 matches, for an average of 4.35 goals per match.

8 goals

- (Vietnam) Phạm Hải Yến

5 goals

- (South Korea) Moon Mi-ra

3 goals

- (Chinese Taipei) Lai Li-chin
- (Jordan) Maysa Jbarah
- (Myanmar) San Thaw Thaw
- (Myanmar) Win Theingi Tun
- (Thailand) Kanyanat Chetthabutr
- (Thailand) Irravadee Makris
- (Uzbekistan) Diyorakhon Khabibullaeva
- (Uzbekistan) Makhliyo Sarikova

2 goals

- (Chinese Taipei) Chen Yen-ping
- (Iran) Behnaz Taherkhani
- (Lebanon) Hanin Tamim
- (Philippines) Tahnai Annis
- (South Korea) Cho So-hyun
- (South Korea) Choo Hyo-joo
- (South Korea) Lee Geum-min
- (Myanmar) July Kyaw
- (Myanmar) Khin Mo Mo Tun
- (Myanmar) Myat Noe Khin
- (Tajikistan) Laylo Khalimova
- (Thailand) Silawan Intamee
- (Thailand) Janista Jinantuya
- (Uzbekistan) Nilufar Kudratova
- (Vietnam) Huỳnh Như
- (Vietnam) Nguyễn Thị Bích Thùy
- (Vietnam) Nguyễn Thị Thanh Nhã
- (Vietnam) Nguyễn Thị Tuyết Dung

1 goal

- (Chinese Taipei) Su Yu-hsuan
- (Guam) April Talledo
- (Hong Kong) Chung Pui Ki
- (Indonesia) Baiq Amiatun
- (Indonesia) Octavianti Dwi
- (Iran) Hajar Dabbaghi
- (Iran) Golnoosh Khosravi
- (Iran) Melika Motevalli
- (Jordan) Bana Al Bitar
- (Jordan) Shahnaz Jebreen
- (Lebanon) Lili Iskandar
- (Lebanon) Syntia Salha
- (Malaysia) Steffi Sarge Kaur
- (Malaysia) Andrea Lee
- (Myanmar) Chit Chit
- (Myanmar) Pont Pont Pyae Maung
- (Nepal) Bimala Chaudhary
- (Philippines) Chandler McDaniel
- (Philippines) Camille Wilson
- (South Korea) Choe Yu-ri
- (South Korea) Ji So-yun
- (South Korea) Lee Min-a
- (South Korea) Park Ye-eun
- (Tajikistan) Nekubakht Khudododova
- (Tajikistan) Natalia Sotnikova
- (Thailand) Nutwadee Pram-nak
- (United Arab Emirates) Nouf Al-Adwan
- (United Arab Emirates) Naeema Ibrahim
- (Uzbekistan) Saida Galimova
- (Uzbekistan) Lyudmila Karachik
- (Uzbekistan) Maftuna Shoyimova
- (Vietnam) Chương Thị Kiều
- (Vietnam) Hoàng Thị Loan
- (Vietnam) Hồ Thị Quỳnh
- (Vietnam) Nguyễn Thị Tuyết Ngân
- (Vietnam) Nguyễn Thị Vạn
- (Vietnam) Trần Thị Thùy Trang

1 own goal

- (Maldives) Hawwa Haneefa (against Vietnam)
- (Mongolia) Altantuya Altansukh (against Uzbekistan)
- (Uzbekistan) Nozima Kamoltoeva (against South Korea)
