= 2023 FIFA Women's World Cup Group A =

Football tournament teams

Group A of the 2023 FIFA Women's World Cup was one of eight groups that formed the opening round of the tournament with the matches played from 20 to 30 July 2023. The group consisted of hosts New Zealand, Norway, the Philippines and Switzerland. The top two teams, Switzerland and Norway, advanced to the round of 16.

New Zealand became the first FIFA Women's World Cup host country to be eliminated in the group stage; it was also the sixth consecutive exit in which New Zealand had failed to advance past the first round. While this was the fifth time Norway finished second in a Women's World Cup group, this was Switzerland's first experience of topping a group in the tournament's history.

== Teams ==
Draw position	Team	Pot	Confederation	Method of qualification	Date of qualification	Finals appearance	Last appearance	Previous best performance	FIFA Rankings	
Draw position	Team	Pot	Confederation	Method of qualification	Date of qualification	Finals appearance	Last appearance	Previous best performance	October 2022 (Note: The rankings of October 2022 were used for seeding for the final draw.)	June 2023
A1	New Zealand	1	OFC	Hosts	25 June 2020	6th	2019	Group stage (1991, 2007, 2011, 2015, 2019)	22	26
A2	Norway	2	UEFA	UEFA Group F winners	2 September 2022	9th	2019	Winners (1995)	12	12
A3	Philippines	4	AFC	2022 AFC Women's Asian Cup semi-finalists	30 January 2022	1st	—	Debut	53	46
A4	Switzerland	3	UEFA	UEFA play-off best ranked winners	11 October 2022	2nd	2015	Round of 16 (2015)	21	20

== Standings ==
Pos	Team	Pld	W	D	L	GF	GA	GD	Pts	Qualification
1	Switzerland	3	1	2	0	2	0	+2	5	Advance to knockout stage
2	Norway	3	1	1	1	6	1	+5	4	Advance to knockout stage
3	New Zealand (H)	3	1	1	1	1	1	0	4	
4	Philippines	3	1	0	2	1	8	−7	3	

Source: FIFA
Rules for classification: Group stage tiebreakers
(H) Hosts

In the round of 16:

- The winners of Group A, Switzerland, advanced to play the runners-up of Group C, Spain.
- The runners-up of Group A, Norway, advanced to play the winners of Group C, Japan.

== Matches ==
All times listed are local, NZST (UTC+12).

=== New Zealand vs Norway ===
20 July 2023
19:00

New Zealand	1–0	Norway
Wilkinson 48'	Report

Eden Park, Auckland
Attendance: 42,137
Referee: Yoshimi Yamashita (Japan)

New Zealand	Norway

GK	21	Victoria Esson
RB	4	CJ Bott
CB	13	Rebekah Stott	(substituted off) 70'
CB	14	Katie Bowen
LB	7	Ali Riley (c)
DM	2	Ria Percival
CM	12	Betsy Hassett
CM	6	Malia Steinmetz
RF	20	Indiah-Paige Riley
CF	17	Hannah Wilkinson	(substituted off) 86'
LF	16	Jacqui Hand	(substituted off) 90+4'
Substitutions:
DF	3	Claudia Bunge	(substituted on) 70'
FW	15	Paige Satchell	(substituted on) 86'
FW	9	Gabi Rennie	(substituted on) 90+4'
Manager:
(Czech Republic) Jitka Klimková

GK	23	Aurora Mikalsen
RB	13	Thea Bjelde		(substituted off) 90+3'
CB	6	Maren Mjelde (c)
CB	16	Mathilde Harviken
LB	4	Tuva Hansen
DM	18	Frida Maanum		(substituted off) 74'
CM	7	Ingrid Syrstad Engen
CM	11	Guro Reiten
RF	10	Caroline Graham Hansen
CF	14	Ada Hegerberg
LF	17	Julie Blakstad		(substituted off) 56'
Substitutions:
FW	20	Emilie Haavi	(yellow card) 85'	(substituted on) 56'
MF	8	Vilde Bøe Risa		(substituted on) 74'
DF	2	Anja Sønstevold		(substituted on) 90+3'
Manager:
Hege Riise

Player of the Match:
Hannah Wilkinson (New Zealand)

Assistant referees:
Makoto Bozono (Japan)
Naomi Teshirogi (Japan)
Fourth official:
Ivana Martinčić (Croatia)
Video assistant referee:
Tatiana Guzmán (Nicaragua)
Assistant video assistant referee:
Carol Anne Chenard (Canada)
Offside video assistant referee:
Chantal Boudreau (Canada)

=== Philippines vs Switzerland ===
21 July 2023
17:00

Philippines	0–2	Switzerland
	Report	Bachmann 45' (pen.); Piubel 64'

Forsyth Barr Stadium, Dunedin
Attendance: 13,711
Referee: Vincentia Amedome (Togo)

Philippines	Switzerland

GK	1	Olivia McDaniel
CB	5	Hali Long (c)
CB	3	Jessika Cowart
CB	13	Angela Beard
RWB	17	Alicia Barker
LWB	16	Sofia Harrison	(yellow card) 38'
CM	20	Quinley Quezada		(substituted off) 70'
CM	4	Jaclyn Sawicki
CM	8	Sara Eggesvik		(substituted off) 70'
CF	7	Sarina Bolden		(substituted off) 81'
CF	21	Katrina Guillou
Substitutions:
FW	9	Isabella Flanigan		(substituted on) 70'
FW	14	Meryll Serrano		(substituted on) 70'
FW	10	Chandler McDaniel		(substituted on) 81'
Manager:
(Australia) Alen Stajcic

GK	1	Gaëlle Thalmann
RB	19	Eseosa Aigbogun
CB	15	Luana Bühler
CB	2	Julia Stierli
LB	5	Noelle Maritz	(yellow card) 83'
DM	13	Lia Wälti (c)		(substituted off) 75'
CM	11	Coumba Sow
CM	6	Géraldine Reuteler		(substituted off) 90'
RF	17	Seraina Piubel		(substituted off) 90'
CF	9	Ana Maria Crnogorčević
LF	10	Ramona Bachmann	(yellow card) 8'	(substituted off) 70'
Substitutions:
FW	23	Alisha Lehmann		(substituted on) 70'
MF	16	Sandrine Mauron		(substituted on) 75'
FW	22	Meriame Terchoun		(substituted on) 90'
DF	8	Nadine Riesen		(substituted on) 90'
Manager:
(Germany) Inka Grings

Player of the Match:
Ramona Bachmann (Switzerland)

Assistant referees:
Carine Atezambong Fomo (Cameroon)
Fanta Kone (Mali)
Fourth official:
Myriam Marcotte (Canada)
Video assistant referee:
Drew Fischer (Canada)
Assistant video assistant referee:
Adil Zourak (Morocco)
Offside video assistant referee:
Kathryn Nesbitt (United States)

=== New Zealand vs Philippines ===
This was only the second ever win for a Southeast Asian country (excluding Australia which geographically is not in Southeast Asia) at a senior World Cup (male or female) and the first since Thailand beat Ivory Coast in the 2015 Women's World Cup.

25 July 2023
17:30

New Zealand	0–1	Philippines
	Report	Bolden 24'

Wellington Regional Stadium, Wellington
Attendance: 32,357
Referee: Katia García (Mexico)

New Zealand	Philippines

GK	21	Victoria Esson
RB	4	CJ Bott
CB	13	Rebekah Stott
CB	14	Katie Bowen
LB	7	Ali Riley
DM	6	Malia Steinmetz
CM	2	Ria Percival (c)		(substituted off) 83'
CM	12	Betsy Hassett		(substituted off) 46'
RF	20	Indiah-Paige Riley		(substituted off) 46'
CF	17	Hannah Wilkinson	(yellow card) 42'
LF	16	Jacqui Hand
Substitutions:
MF	11	Olivia Chance		(substituted on) 46'
MF	10	Annalie Longo		(substituted on) 46'
FW	18	Grace Jale		(substituted on) 83'
Manager:
(Czech Republic) Jitka Klimková

GK	1	Olivia McDaniel
RB	17	Alicia Barker		(substituted off) 70'
CB	5	Hali Long (c)
CB	13	Angela Beard	(yellow card) 49'
LB	16	Sofia Harrison
RM	4	Jaclyn Sawicki
CM	3	Jessika Cowart		(substituted off) 83'
CM	8	Sara Eggesvik		(substituted off) 63'
LM	20	Quinley Quezada		(substituted off) 70'
CF	7	Sarina Bolden		(substituted off) 83'
CF	21	Katrina Guillou
Substitutions:
FW	9	Isabella Flanigan		(substituted on) 63'
DF	19	Dominique Randle		(substituted on) 70'
MF	6	Tahnai Annis		(substituted on) 70'
MF	12	Ryley Bugay		(substituted on) 83'
FW	15	Carleigh Frilles		(substituted on) 83'
Manager:
(Australia) Alen Stajcic

Player of the Match:
Olivia McDaniel (Philippines)

Assistant referees:
Karen Díaz Medina (Mexico)
Enedina Caudillo (Mexico)
Fourth official:
Kim Yu-jeong (South Korea)
Video assistant referee:
Abdulla Al-Marri (Qatar)
Assistant video assistant referee:
Adil Zourak (Morocco)
Offside video assistant referee:
Fatiha Jermoumi (Morocco)

=== Switzerland vs Norway ===
25 July 2023
20:00

Switzerland	0–0	Norway
	Report

Waikato Stadium, Hamilton
Attendance: 10,769
Referee: Stéphanie Frappart (France)

Switzerland	Norway

GK	1	Gaëlle Thalmann
RB	19	Eseosa Aigbogun
CB	5	Noelle Maritz
CB	2	Julia Stierli
LB	8	Nadine Riesen
DM	13	Lia Wälti (c)
CM	11	Coumba Sow
CM	6	Géraldine Reuteler	(substituted off) 78'
RF	17	Seraina Piubel	(substituted off) 88'
CF	9	Ana Maria Crnogorčević
LF	10	Ramona Bachmann	(substituted off) 90+3'
Substitutions:
MF	16	Sandrine Mauron	(substituted on) 78'
FW	22	Meriame Terchoun	(substituted on) 88'
MF	14	Marion Rey	(substituted on) 90+3'
Manager:
(Germany) Inka Grings

GK	23	Aurora Mikalsen
RB	13	Thea Bjelde	(substituted off) 88'
CB	6	Maren Mjelde (c)
CB	16	Mathilde Harviken
LB	4	Tuva Hansen	(substituted off) 73'
DM	8	Vilde Bøe Risa	(substituted off) 88'
CM	18	Frida Maanum
CM	11	Guro Reiten
RF	22	Sophie Román Haug	(substituted off) 73'
CF	15	Amalie Eikeland	(substituted off) 57'
LF	20	Emilie Haavi
Substitutions:
MF	10	Caroline Graham Hansen	(substituted on) 57'
DF	2	Anja Sønstevold	(substituted on) 73'
FW	9	Karina Sævik	(substituted on) 73'
DF	19	Marit Bratberg Lund	(substituted on) 88'
MF	7	Ingrid Syrstad Engen	(substituted on) 88'
Manager:
Hege Riise

Player of the Match:
Gaëlle Thalmann (Switzerland)

Assistant referees:
Manuela Nicolosi (France)
Élodie Coppola (France)
Fourth official:
Anahí Fernández (Uruguay)
Video assistant referee:
Pol van Boekel (Netherlands)
Assistant video assistant referee:
Marco Fritz (Germany)
Offside video assistant referee:
Ella De Vries (Belgium)

=== Switzerland vs New Zealand ===
30 July 2023
19:00

Switzerland	0–0	New Zealand
	Report

Forsyth Barr Stadium, Dunedin
Attendance: 25,947
Referee: Tori Penso (United States)

Switzerland	New Zealand

GK	1	Gaëlle Thalmann
RB	19	Eseosa Aigbogun
CB	5	Noelle Maritz
CB	2	Julia Stierli
LB	8	Nadine Riesen
DM	13	Lia Wälti (c)
CM	11	Coumba Sow
CM	6	Géraldine Reuteler	(substituted off) 71'
RF	17	Seraina Piubel	(substituted off) 85'
CF	9	Ana Maria Crnogorčević	(substituted off) 90+4'
LF	10	Ramona Bachmann	(substituted off) 85'
Substitutions:
FW	23	Alisha Lehmann	(substituted on) 71'
MF	16	Sandrine Mauron	(substituted on) 85'
DF	18	Viola Calligaris	(substituted on) 85'
FW	22	Meriame Terchoun	(substituted on) 90+4'
Manager:
(Germany) Inka Grings

GK	21	Victoria Esson
RB	4	CJ Bott
CB	13	Rebekah Stott	(substituted off) 62'
CB	14	Katie Bowen
LB	7	Ali Riley (c)
DM	6	Malia Steinmetz
CM	10	Annalie Longo	(substituted off) 62'
CM	2	Ria Percival	(substituted off) 71'
RF	16	Jacqui Hand
CF	17	Hannah Wilkinson	(substituted off) 82'
LF	11	Olivia Chance	(substituted off) 46'
Substitutions:
FW	20	Indiah-Paige Riley	(substituted on) 46'
MF	12	Betsy Hassett	(substituted on) 62'
DF	3	Claudia Bunge	(substituted on) 62'
FW	18	Grace Jale	(substituted on) 71'
FW	9	Gabi Rennie	(substituted on) 82'
Manager:
(Czech Republic) Jitka Klimková

Player of the Match:
Ana Maria Crnogorčević (Switzerland)

Assistant referees:
Brooke Mayo (United States)
Mijensa Rensch (Suriname)
Fourth official:
Iuliana Demetrescu (Romania)
Video assistant referee:
Nicolás Gallo (Colombia)
Assistant video assistant referee:
Juan Soto (Venezuela)
Offside video assistant referee:
Leslie Vásquez (Chile)

=== Norway vs Philippines ===
30 July 2023
19:00

Norway	6–0	Philippines
Román Haug 6', 17', 90+5'; Graham Hansen 31'; Barker 48' (o.g.); Reiten 53' (pen.)	Report

Eden Park, Auckland
Attendance: 34,697
Referee: Marie-Soleil Beaudoin (Canada)

Norway	Philippines

GK	23	Aurora Mikalsen
RB	13	Thea Bjelde		(substituted off) 68'
CB	6	Maren Mjelde (c)
CB	16	Mathilde Harviken		(substituted off) 81'
LB	4	Tuva Hansen
DM	8	Vilde Bøe Risa	(yellow card) 86'
CM	18	Frida Maanum		(substituted off) 68'
CM	11	Guro Reiten
RF	10	Caroline Graham Hansen		(substituted off) 81'
CF	22	Sophie Román Haug
LF	20	Emilie Haavi		(substituted off) 68'
Substitutions:
MF	7	Ingrid Syrstad Engen		(substituted on) 68'
FW	9	Karina Sævik		(substituted on) 68'
DF	2	Anja Sønstevold		(substituted on) 68'
FW	21	Anna Jøsendal		(substituted on) 81'
DF	5	Guro Bergsvand		(substituted on) 81'
Manager:
Hege Riise

GK	1	Olivia McDaniel
RB	17	Alicia Barker		(substituted off) 57'
CB	5	Hali Long (c)
CB	3	Jessika Cowart
LB	13	Angela Beard
RM	20	Quinley Quezada		(substituted off) 81'
CM	8	Sara Eggesvik
CM	4	Jaclyn Sawicki		(substituted off) 74'
LM	21	Katrina Guillou	(yellow card) 54'
CF	7	Sarina Bolden		(substituted off) 74'
CF	9	Isabella Flanigan		(substituted off) 57'
Substitutions:
DF	16	Sofia Harrison	(red card) 67'	(substituted on) 57'
DF	19	Dominique Randle		(substituted on) 57'
MF	12	Ryley Bugay		(substituted on) 74'
FW	10	Chandler McDaniel		(substituted on) 74'
FW	14	Meryll Serrano		(substituted on) 81'
Manager:
(Australia) Alen Stajcic

Player of the Match:
Sophie Román Haug (Norway)

Assistant referees:
Chantal Boudreau (Canada)
Stephanie Yee Sing (Jamaica)
Fourth official:
Anahí Fernández (Uruguay)
Video assistant referee:
Drew Fischer (Canada)
Assistant video assistant referee:
Salomé di Iorio (Argentina)
Offside video assistant referee:
Sian Massey-Ellis (England)

== Discipline ==
Fair play points would have been used as tiebreakers in the group had the overall and head-to-head records of teams were tied. These were calculated based on yellow and red cards received in all group matches as follows:

- first yellow card: minus 1 point;
- indirect red card (second yellow card): minus 3 points;
- direct red card: minus 4 points;
- yellow card and direct red card: minus 5 points;

Only one of the above deductions was applied to a player in a single match.

Team	Match 1				Match 2				Match 3				Points
Team	Booked	(yellow card) (yellow-red card)	Sent off (straight red)	(yellow card) (red card)	Booked	(yellow card) (yellow-red card)	Sent off (straight red)	(yellow card) (red card)	Booked	(yellow card) (yellow-red card)	Sent off (straight red)	(yellow card) (red card)	Points
New Zealand					1								–1
Norway	1								1				–2
Switzerland	2												–2
Philippines	1				1				1		1		–7

== See also ==
- New Zealand at the FIFA Women's World Cup
- Norway at the FIFA Women's World Cup
- Philippines at the FIFA Women's World Cup
- Switzerland at the FIFA Women's World Cup
