= Philippines at the FIFA Women's World Cup =

International sporting event delegation

The Philippines women's national football team has qualified to the FIFA Women's World Cup on two occasions, the 2023 FIFA Women's World Cup and the 2027 FIFA Women's World Cup. The Women's World Cup is the country's debut at any major FIFA football competition in their history.

== 2023 World Cup ==
=== Qualification ===
The Philippines qualified for their very first FIFA Women's World Cup via their 2022 AFC Women's Asian Cup semifinal finish. This is the first time the country qualified for a FIFA World Cup of any gender or age level. Their Asian Cup campaign was led by Australian tactician Alen Stajcic who was appointed as head coach in October 2021. They secured their place in the 2023 FIFA Women's World Cup when they beat Chinese Taipei in the quarterfinals on penalties following a 1–1 draw. They end their campaign with a 0–2 defeat to South Korea in the semifinal.

=== Preparations ===
Since their qualification for the World Cup through the Women's Asian Cup, the Philippines went on to win the 2022 AFF Women's Championship title at home – their first major title.

The national team also held training camps in Costa Rica and Chile in late 2022. They also took part in the 2023 Pinatar Cup in Spain. They also had additional matches playing in the 2023 SEA Games and the first round of the 2024 Summer Olympics Asian qualifiers.

In New Zealand shortly prior to their debut in the World Cup, the Philippines played an unofficial friendly against Sweden and a scrimmage against the United States.

=== Group stage ===
For the 2023 World Cup group stage, the Philippines were drawn to play against co-host New Zealand, Norway, and Switzerland. Among these national teams, the Philippines has only faced New Zealand in an international match recently, a 1–2 loss on September 7, 2022.

==== Group A ====
Pos	Team	Pld	W	D	L	GF	GA	GD	Pts	Qualification
1	Switzerland	3	1	2	0	2	0	+2	5	Advance to knockout stage
2	Norway	3	1	1	1	6	1	+5	4	Advance to knockout stage
3	New Zealand (H)	3	1	1	1	1	1	0	4	
4	Philippines	3	1	0	2	1	8	−7	3	

Source: FIFA
(H) Hosts

The Philippines played its first ever World Cup match against Switzerland. Katrina Guillou appeared to score the Philippines' first ever goal on the 16th minute but was disallowed after it was ruled to be offside. Shortly before halftime ended, Switzerland was awarded a controversial penalty after Jessika Cowart committed an apparent foul on Coumba Sow while attempting to clear the ball. A VAR review was called, and the Swiss were given a penalty which was converted to a goal by Ramona Bachmann. The game eventually ended in a 0–2 defeat.

The next game is against co-host New Zealand which was coming from a shock win against Norway. The Philippines secured their first ever World Cup win through a solitary goal by Sarina Bolden in the 24th minute, which is also the very first goal by the Philippines in the tournament. New Zealand's best chance to equalize was when Jacqui Hand shot the ball into the goal from Hannah Wilkinson's cross in the 68th minute. However the goal was determined to be offside.

The Philippines last group stage match is against Norway. With Norway drawing their second match against Switzerland. All four teams are still in contention to advance to the Round of 16. An unexpected win against Norway would assure the Philippines to advance. However the Philippines lost big to Norway, conceding six goals effectively ending their campaign.

21 July 2023
17:00 UTC+12

Philippines	0–2	Switzerland
	Report	Bachmann 45' (pen.); Piubel 64'

Forsyth Barr Stadium, Dunedin
Attendance: 13,711
Referee: Vincentia Amedome (Togo)

25 July 2023
17:30 UTC+12

New Zealand	0–1	Philippines
	Report	Bolden 24'

Wellington Regional Stadium, Wellington
Attendance: 32,357
Referee: Katia García (Mexico)

30 July 2023
19:00 UTC+12

Norway	6–0	Philippines
Román Haug 6', 17', 90+5'; Graham Hansen 31'; Barker 48' (o.g.); Reiten 53' (pen.)	Report

Eden Park, Auckland
Attendance: 34,697
Referee: Marie-Soleil Beaudoin (Canada)

== 2027 World Cup ==
=== Qualification ===
The Philippines made their attempt for a second straight FIFA Women's World Cup through the 2026 AFC Women's Asian Cup in Australia having been drawn in Group A, along with the hosts, South Korea and Iran. The Philippines finished as third in the group after defeating Iran, 2–0. The Philippines were confirmed as among the best third placers, eliminating Vietnam from contention which had an inferior goal difference (−4).

In the quarterfinals, the Philippines lost 0–7 to Japan after a mostly goalless first half. They would have already qualified for the 2027 FIFA Women's World Cup had they reached the semifinals.

The Philippines got relegated to the play-in tournament where they won 2–0 against Uzbekistan, securing their second consecutive qualification for the FIFA Women's World Cup. Uzbekistan advanced to the inter-confederation play-offs.

=== Group stage ===
To be determined

== FIFA World Cup record ==
The Philippines' FIFA Women's World Cup record
Year	Result	Position	GP	W	D*	L	GF	GA	GD
(China) 1991	Did not enter								
(Sweden) 1995	Did not qualify								
(United States) 1999	Did not qualify								
(United States) 2003	Did not qualify								
(China) 2007	Did not qualify								
(Germany) 2011	Did not enter								
(Canada) 2015	Did not qualify								
(France) 2019	Did not qualify								
(Australia) (New Zealand) 2023	Group stage	24th	3	1	0	2	1	8	–7
(Brazil) 2027	Qualified								
(Costa Rica) (Jamaica) (Mexico) (United States) 2031	To be determined								
(United Kingdom) 2035	To be determined								
Total	2/10	Group stage	3	1	0	2	1	8	–7

*Draws include knockout matches decided on penalty kicks.

== Record ==
FIFA Women's World Cup history
Year	Round	Date	Opponent	Result	Stadium
(Australia) / (New Zealand) 2023	Group stage	21 July	Switzerland	L 0–2	Forsyth Barr Stadium, Dunedin
(Australia) / (New Zealand) 2023	Group stage	25 July	New Zealand	W 1–0	Wellington Regional Stadium, Wellington
(Australia) / (New Zealand) 2023	Group stage	30 July	Norway	L 0–6	Eden Park, Auckland
(Brazil) 2027	Group stage				

=== Record by opponent ===
FIFA Women's World Cup matches (by team)
Opponent	Pld	W	D	L	GF	GA
New Zealand	1	1	0	0	1	0
Norway	1	0	0	1	0	6
Switzerland	1	0	0	1	0	2

== Goalscorers ==
Player	Goals	2023	2027
Sarina Bolden	1	1	
Total	1	1	

Own goals scored for opponents

- Alicia Barker (scored for Norway in 2023)

== Media coverage ==
For the Philippines debut in 2023, there were concerns that the country would not have any official broadcaster to cover the tournament in Philippine television. Cable television broadcaster and streaming outfit Tap Go placed a bid for the rights but withdrew.

Cignal TV acquired the rights in July 2023.

Edition	Rights holder(s)	Ref.
2023	Cignal TV	

== See also ==
- Philippines at the AFC Women's Asian Cup
