= Jitka Klimková =

Czech footballer and manager (born 1974)

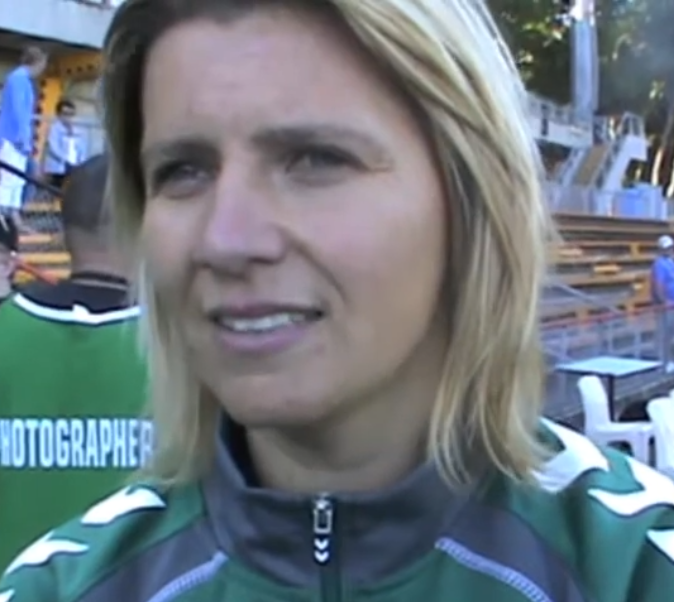
- In a 2011 interview

Personal information
- Date of birth: 20 August 1974 (age 52)
- Place of birth: Kyjov, Czechoslovakia
- Position: Defender

Team information
- Current team: Czech Republic (manager)

Senior career*
Years	Team	Apps	(Gls)
1991–1992	Sokol Čejč		
1992–1995	Slávia Holíč		
1995–2003	Compex Otrokovice		

International career
2000–2001	Czech Republic	2	(0)

Managerial career
- 2004–2011: Slovácko
- 2009–2010: Czech Republic U-19
- 2011–2013: Canberra United
- 2013–2014: New Zealand U-17
- 2014: New Zealand (assistant)
- 2015–2017: United States U-19
- 2017–2019: United States U-20
- 2019–2021: Internationals SC
- 2021–2024: New Zealand
- 2025–: Czech Republic
- * Club domestic league appearances and goals

Jitka Klimková (born 20 August 1974) is a Czech professional football coach and former player. She is the head coach of the Czech Republic women's national team.

== Biography ==
During her playing career she played for Sokol Čejč, Slávia Holíč and DFC Compex Otrokovice in the Czech Women's First League. She was briefly a member of the Czech national team, playing as a defender.

She has coached the United States women's u-20 team, United States women's under-19 team, Canberra United in Australia's W-League, 1.FC Slovácko, the Czech Republic women's team and Internationals Soccer Club in Ohio, USA. In Australia, she was named Coach of the Year in the W-League in 2011-12. In New Zealand, she has coached the national under-17 women’s team, including their campaign at the FIFA 2014 Under-17 Women's World Cup, and has also worked as an assistant coach with the Under-20s and the Football Ferns.

In September 2021, Klimková was the first woman appointed to coach the Football Ferns on a full-time basis.

At the 2023 FIFA Women's World Cup, she guided the Ferns to their first ever victory in the tournament, in a 1–0 victory over Norway in the opening match in Auckland.

She stepped down from coaching the Football Ferns in 2024.

On 21 January 2025, Klimková was appointed head coach of the Czech Republic women's national football team, signed two-year contract with option. On 12 November 2026, FAČR announced that they would not extend Klimková's contract, which expires at the end of the year.
