= Sin Kum-ok =

North Korean footballer

Personal information
- Date of birth: 25 November 1975 (age 50)
- Position: Defender

International career^{‡}
Years	Team	Apps	(Gls)
	North Korea	2	(0)
- ‡ National team caps and goals as of 29 September 2003

Sin Kum-ok (born 25 November 1975,Korean: 신금옥) is a North Korean women's international footballer who plays as a defender. She is a member of the North Korea women's national football team. She was part of the team at the 2003 FIFA Women's World Cup.

== International goals ==
No.	Date	Venue	Opponent	Score	Result	Competition
1.	11 November 1999	Iloilo Sports Complex, Iloilo City, Philippines	Malaysia	3–0	5–1	1999 AFC Women's Championship
2.	21 November 1999	Panaad Stadium, Bacolod, Philippines	Japan	3–0	3–2	1999 AFC Women's Championship
3.	14 June 2003	Rajamangala Stadium, Bangkok, Thailand	Singapore	10–0	16–0	2003 AFC Women's Championship
