= Golnoosh Khosravi =

Iranian footballer

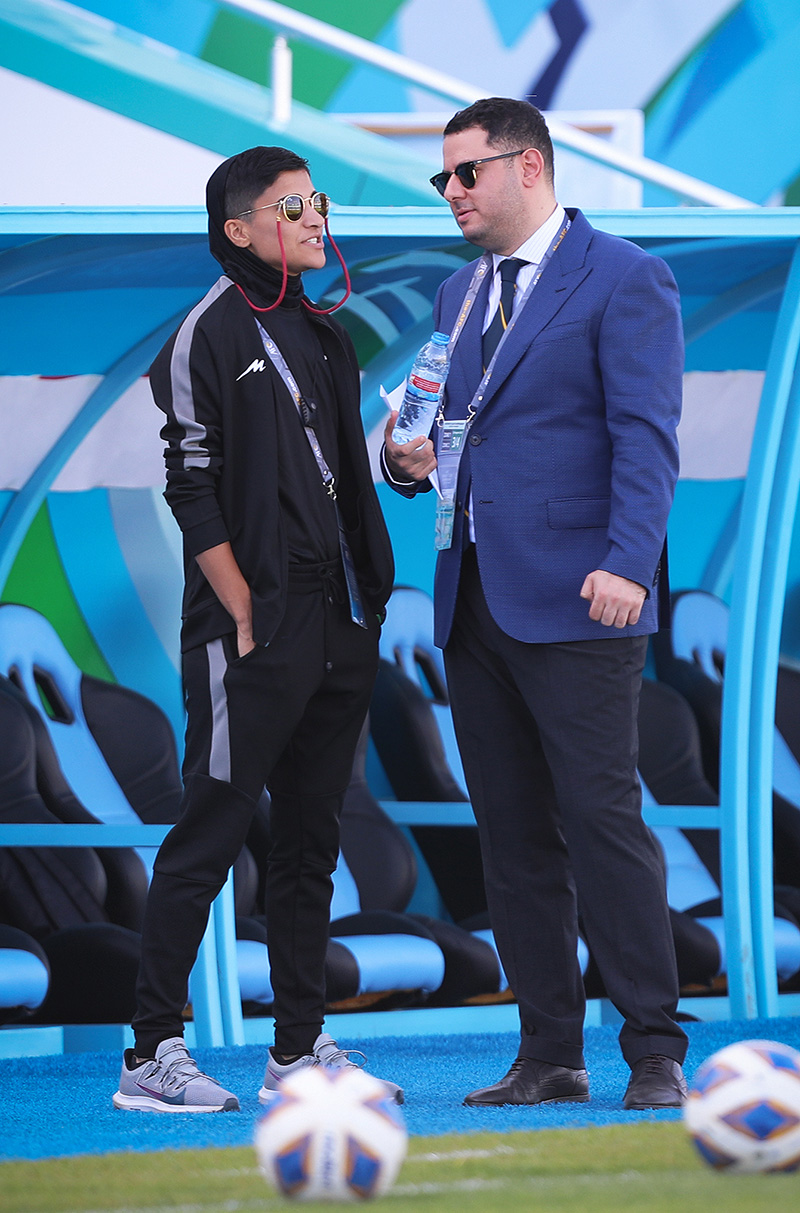
- Khosravi with coach Iman Farzin in 2022

Personal information
- Full name: Golnoosh Khosravi
- Date of birth: 12 May 2001 (age 25)
- Place of birth: Shahin Shahr, Iran
- Height: 1.71 m (5 ft 7 1/2 in)
- Position: Winger

Team information
- Current team: Bam Khatoon
- Number: 21

Senior career*
Years	Team	Apps	(Gls)
- Zob Ahan Isfahan
2019–2020	Konak Belediyespor	6	(0)
2021–	Bam Khatoon		

International career
- Iran U14
- Iran U16
	Iran U20	7	
2021–	Iran	5	(1)
- * Club domestic league appearances and goals as of 4 March 2020

Golnoosh Khosravi (born 12 May 2001) is an Iranian footballer who plays as a winger for the Iran national team and Bam Khatoon.

In 2019, at the age of 18, she became the youngest Iranian woman footballer to play in an overseas football league when she moved to the Turkish Konak Belediyespor team to play in the Turkish Women's Football Premier League.

In March 2026, during the AFC Women's Asian Cup in Australia, Khosravi was reported to be among the members of the Iran women's national football team who remained in the country and sought asylum after fears of retaliation if they returned to Iran. The incident occurred after several players had already been granted humanitarian visas by the Australian government.

== Early life ==
Golnoosh Khosravi was born in 2001 in Shahinshahr, Isfahan, as the only child. She lost her father due to an accident and lived with her mother.

== Career ==
Khosravi entered the field of football at the age of 10. She was with Zob Ahan Isfahan's at the age of 14. In August 2019, Khosravi signed a two-year contract with the Turkish Konak Belediyespor team and began to play in the Turkish Women's Football Premier League, making her the youngest Iranian woman football player to play abroad. She played as a right midfielder and as a left midfielder in Konak Belediyespor. Due to her physical resemblance and fast style of play, she was compared to Neymar.

Due to the COVID-19 pandemic in Turkey, Khosravi was quarantined in Turkey away from her family and could not return to Iran after 10 months of playing in the Turkish league, and celebrated her 19th birthday alone. She appeared in six matches of the 2019-20 Turkish Women's First League season.

Upon returning to Iran, she began training at the Iranian national team camp.

In 2021, Khosravi played with Iranian women's national team and represented Iran in 2022 AFC Women's Asian Cup qualification matches.

Later in 2021, she joined Bam Khatoon Football Club, the most titled Iranian women's football team.

== International goals ==
No.	Date	Venue	Opponent	Score	Result	Competition
1.	22 September 2021	Milliy Stadium, Tashkent, Uzbekistan	Bangladesh	2–0	5–0	2022 AFC Women's Asian Cup qualification
