= Li Yating =

Chinese footballer

Personal information
- Place of birth: China

Senior career*
Years	Team	Apps	(Gls)
- Dalian

International career
- China PR
- * Club domestic league appearances and goals

Li Yating (simplified Chinese: 李亚婷; traditional Chinese: 李亞婷; pinyin: Lǐ Yàtíng) is a Chinese former footballer who played for the China women's national team.

== Career ==
In club football, Li played for the Dalian women's football team. She was also member of the China national team, and was included in the team's squad at the 1993 Summer Universiade football tournament, which saw China win the gold medal. She was also included in the squad for the 1995 AFC Women's Championship, in which she scored two goals against the Philippines and one against Kazakhstan as China won the tournament. The following year, she was included as an alternate player for the football tournament at the 1996 Summer Olympics in Atlanta, in which China won the silver medal. She also played in a friendly match against the United States under-20 team on 27 April 1996, assisting a goal in a 2–0 win.
