= Philippines at the AFC Asian Cup =

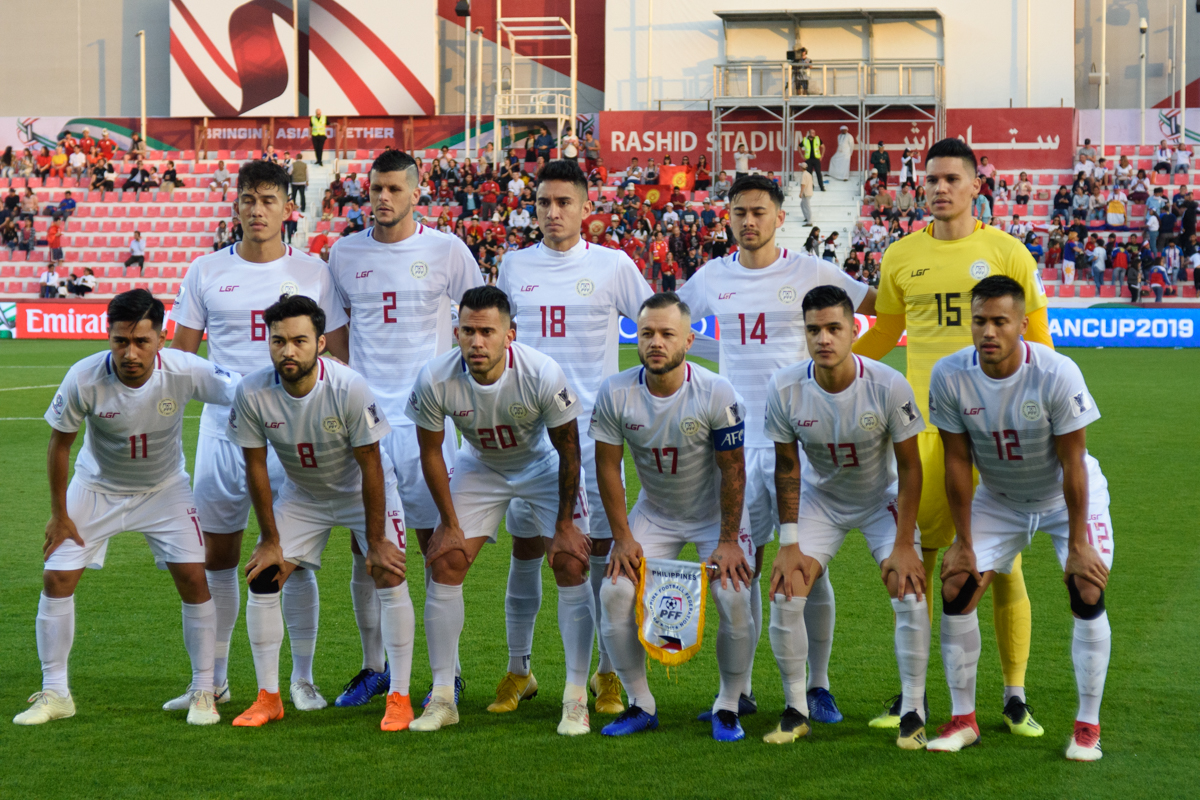
Philippines at the 2019 AFC Asian Cup.

The Philippines has played in one edition of the AFC Asian Cup, in 2019 when they made their debut. The country failed to qualify prior to this edition. The closest occasion was in 2014 when they lost to Palestine in the final of the 2014 AFC Challenge Cup, in which the winner qualified to the tournament.

They finally clinched qualification on 27 March 2018 when they beat Tajikistan at home.

== Record ==
Year	AFC Asian Cup record							Qualifying record					
Year	Round	Pld	W	D	L	GF	GA	Pld	W	D*	L	GF	GA
(Hong Kong) 1956	Did not qualify							2	0	0	2	0	5
(South Korea) 1960	Did not qualify							2	0	0	2	4	14
(Israel) 1964	Withdrew							Withdrew					
(Iran) 1968	Did not qualify							2	0	0	2	0	5
(Thailand) 1972	Withdrew							Withdrew					
(Iran) 1976	Withdrew							Withdrew					
(Kuwait) 1980	Did not qualify							3	0	0	3	1	10
(Singapore) 1984	Did not qualify							5	0	0	5	3	16
(Qatar) 1988	Did not enter							Did not enter					
(Japan) 1992	Did not enter							Did not enter					
(United Arab Emirates) 1996	Did not qualify							3	0	0	3	1	20
(Lebanon) 2000	Did not qualify							3	1	0	2	2	11
(China) 2004	Did not enter							Did not enter					
(Indonesia) (Malaysia) (Thailand) (Vietnam) 2007	Did not enter							Did not enter					
(Qatar) 2011	Did not qualify							See 2008 & 2010 AFC Challenge Cup records					
(Australia) 2015	Did not qualify							See 2012 & 2014 AFC Challenge Cup records					
(United Arab Emirates) 2019	Group stage	3	0	0	3	1	7	14	6	4	4	21	20
(Qatar) 2023	Did not qualify							11	4	3	4	13	15
(Saudi Arabia) 2027	Did not qualify												
Total	Group stage	3	0	0	3	1	7	45	11	7	27	45	116

== 2019 in the United Arab Emirates ==
=== Group C ===
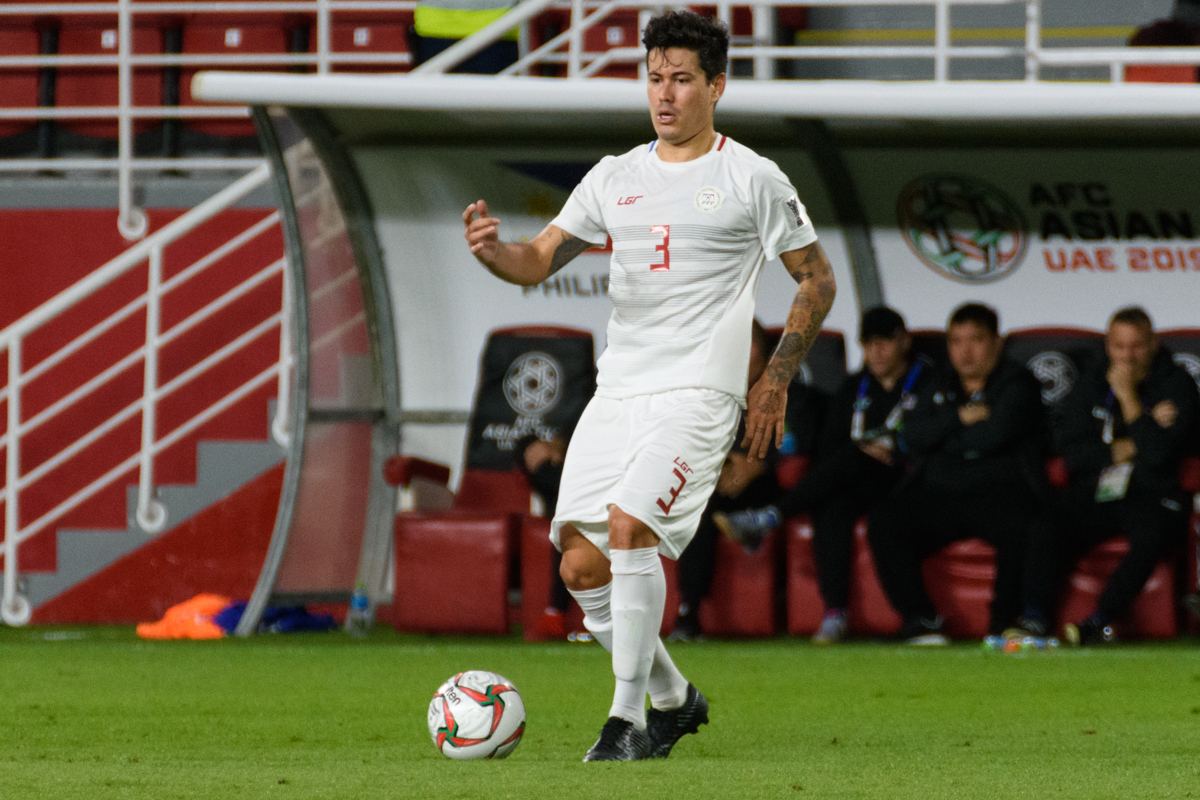
Carli de Murga playing against China.

Pos	Team	Pld	W	D	L	GF	GA	GD	Pts	Qualification
1	South Korea	3	3	0	0	4	0	+4	9	Advance to knockout stage
2	China	3	2	0	1	5	3	+2	6	Advance to knockout stage
3	Kyrgyzstan	3	1	0	2	4	4	0	3	Advance to knockout stage
4	Philippines	3	0	0	3	1	7	−6	0	

Source: AFC
7 January 2019
17:30

South Korea	1–0	Philippines
Hwang Ui-jo 67'	Report

Al Maktoum Stadium, Dubai
Attendance: 3,185
Referee: Nawaf Shukralla (Bahrain)

11 January 2019
17:30

Philippines	0–3	China
	Report	Wu Lei 40', 66'; Yu Dabao 80'

Mohammed bin Zayed Stadium, Abu Dhabi
Attendance: 16,013
Referee: Hiroyuki Kimura (Japan)

16 January 2019
17:30

Kyrgyzstan	3–1	Philippines
Lux 24', 51', 77'	Report	Schröck 80'

Rashid Stadium, Dubai
Attendance: 4,217
Referee: Turki Al-Khudhayr (Saudi Arabia)

== See also ==
- Philippines at the AFC Women's Asian Cup
