= 1999 AFC Women's Championship =

Tournament details
- Host country: Philippines
- Dates: 7–21 November
- Teams: 15 (from 1 confederation)
- Venues: 3 (in 3 host cities)

Final positions
- Champions: China (7th title)
- Runners-up: Chinese Taipei
- Third place: North Korea
- Fourth place: Japan

Tournament statistics
- Matches played: 34
- Goals scored: 218 (6.41 per match)

The Asian Football Confederation's 1999 AFC Women's Championship was held from 7 to 21 November 1999 in the Philippines.

The tournament was to be originally hosted only in Iloilo City and Bacolod but due to continuous rains affecting the conditions of the pitch at the Iloilo Sports Complex, some matches were held in nearby Barotac Nuevo.

The tournament was won by China in the final against Chinese Taipei before an audience of 7,000 at the Panaad Stadium in Bacolod.

== Match officials ==
10 referees and 9 assistant referees were selected to officiate the matches.

Country	Referee	Assistant referees
China	Lu Yinh; Sun Yuzhen; Zhang Donggiang; Zuo Xiodi	Fu Hongjue; Lu Lijuan; Zhu Yu Hong
Japan	Utsumi Kaori; Yayoi Watanabe	Hizae Yashikawa
South Korea	Im Eun-ju	Choi Soo-jin
Nepal	Sharma Kalmana	None
North Korea	Ri Hong-sil; Yang Mi-sun	Park Yong-sun; Ri Song-ok
Philippines	None	Raquel Silva
United States	Kari Seitz	None

== Group stage ==
=== Group A ===
Team	Pld	W	D	L	GF	GA	GD	Pts
North Korea	4	3	1	0	25	3	+22	10
Chinese Taipei	4	3	1	0	23	2	+21	10
Vietnam	4	2	0	2	9	16	−7	6
India	4	1	0	3	3	12	−9	3
Malaysia	4	0	0	4	1	28	−27	0

Source: RSSSF
7 November 1999

North Korea	7–0	India
Ri Hyang-ok 8', 20'; Pak Jong-ae (?), 55'; Jin Pyol-hui 77'; O Kum-ran 86'; ?	Report

Iloilo Sports Complex, Iloilo City
7 November 1999

Chinese Taipei	16–0	Malaysia
Lin Chi-I	Report

Iloilo Sports Complex, Iloilo City

9 November 1999

North Korea	12–1	Vietnam

Philippines
9 November 1999

India	3–0	Malaysia
Tababi Devi (2x); Sujata Kar (?)	Report

Philippines

11 November 1999

Malaysia	1–5	North Korea
Ngah 48' (pen.)	Report	O Kum-ran 4'; Jin Pyol-hui 8'; Sin Kum-ok 11'; Yang Kyong-hui 21'; Pak Jong-ae 30'

Iloilo Sports Complex, Iloilo City
11 November 1999

Chinese Taipei	4–1	Vietnam
Huang Chung-Lan 26', 47' (pen.); Lin Chi-I 39', 90'		Lưu Ngọc Mai 3'

Philippines

13 November 1999

Chinese Taipei	1–1	North Korea
Huang Chung-Lan 66' (pen.)	Report	Jin Pyol-hui 38'

Iloilo Sports Complex, Iloilo City
13 November 1999

India	0–3	Vietnam
	Report

Iloilo Sports Complex, Iloilo City

15 November 1999

Vietnam	4–0	Malaysia
	Report

Panaad Stadium, Bacolod
15 November 1999

Chinese Taipei	2–0	India
	Report

Iloilo Sports Complex, Iloilo City

=== Group B ===
Team	Pld	W	D	L	GF	GA	GD	Pts
China	4	4	0	0	41	2	+39	12
South Korea	4	3	0	1	30	5	+25	9
Kazakhstan	4	2	0	2	16	15	+1	6
Guam	4	1	0	3	2	31	−29	3
Hong Kong	4	0	0	4	0	36	−36	0

Source: RSSSF
7 November 1999

China	5–2	South Korea
?; Liu Ying 31', 71'; Sun Wen 41'; Zhang Ouying 45'	Report	Kang Sung-mi (?), 76'

Panaad Stadium, Bacolod
7 November 1999

Hong Kong	0–8	Kazakhstan

Philippines

9 November 1999

China	15–0	Guam
Fan Chunling 9'; Sun Wen 22', 55'; Liu Ailing 27', 42'; Wang Jian 36', 40', 65', 73'; Qiu Haiyan 70'; Jin Yan 80', 85', 89'; Zhang Ouying 83', 88'

Philippines
9 November 1999

South Korea	6–0	Kazakhstan
Kang Sung-mi 14'; Lee Myung-hwa 18'; Choi Yun-hee 37'; Galimova 67' (o.g.); Kwon Min-joo 79', 82'

Philippines

11 November 1999

Kazakhstan	0–9	China
	Report	Jin Yan 8', 69'; Liu Ying 11', 22', 35', 86', 90' (?); Wang Liping 79'

Panaad Stadium, Bacolod
11 November 1999

Hong Kong	0–2	Guam
		Dervish 55'; Hogan Malay 60'

Philippines

13 November 1999

China	12–0	Hong Kong
Wang Jian (3x); ?	Report

Panaad Stadium, Bacolod
13 November 1999

South Korea	8–0	Guam

Philippines

15 November 1999

Guam	0–8	Kazakhstan

Philippines
15 November 1999

South Korea	14–0	Hong Kong

Philippines

=== Group C ===
Matches were held in Iloilo City and Barotac Nuevo (UTC+8)

Team	Pld	W	D	L	GF	GA	GD	Pts
Japan	4	4	0	0	34	1	+33	12
Uzbekistan	4	3	0	1	9	6	+3	9
Thailand	4	2	0	2	6	10	−4	6
Philippines	4	1	0	3	5	8	−3	3
Nepal	4	0	0	4	1	30	−29	0

Source: RSSSF
8 November 1999
13:30

Japan	9–0	Thailand
Yamagishi 6'; Takakura 10', 26'; Otake 10', 35', 39', 45'; Uchiyama 17', 45'	Report

Iloilo Sports Complex, Iloilo City
8 November 1999
15:30

Philippines	5–0	Nepal
Camaclang 20', 44'; Karen Cacho 76'; Shella Barlovento 80'; Rachel De los Reyes 90'	Report

Iloilo Sports Complex, Iloilo City
Attendance: 2,000

10 November 1999
13:30

Uzbekistan	1–5	Japan
Nargiza Abdurasulova 32'		Obe 11'; Takakura 21'; Otake 44', 47', 62'

Iloilo Sports Complex, Iloilo City
10 November 1999
15:30

Thailand	5–0	Nepal
Penprapai Prompuy

Iloilo Sports Complex, Iloilo City

12 November 1999
14:00

Japan	14–0	Nepal
Obe (?); Yamagishi (?); Mitsui (?); Mikami (?); Isaka; Aizawa (?); Takakura (?); Uchiyama (?); Kasajima (?)

Barotac Nuevo Plaza Field, Barotac Nuevo
12 November 1999
15:00

Philippines	0–1	Uzbekistan

Iloilo Sports Complex, Iloilo City

14 November 1999
14:00

Thailand	0–1	Uzbekistan
	Report	Nargiza Abdurasulova 84'

Barotac Nuevo Plaza Field, Barotac Nuevo
14 November 1999
15:00

Philippines	0–6	Japan
	Report	Isaka 10', 16', 71'; Yamagishi 46'; Aizawa 52'; Hara 63'

Iloilo Sports Complex, Iloilo City

16 November 1999
14:00

Uzbekistan	6–1	Nepal

Barotac Nuevo Plaza Field, Barotac Nuevo
16 November 1999
15:00

Philippines	0–1	Thailand

Iloilo Sports Complex, Iloilo City

=== Best teams in second place ===
Team	Pld	W	D	L	GF	GA	GD	Pts
Chinese Taipei	4	3	1	0	23	2	+21	10
South Korea	4	3	0	1	30	5	+25	9
Uzbekistan	4	3	0	1	9	6	+3	9

Source: RSSSF

== Knockout stage ==
Semi-finals
19 November – Bacolod
North Korea	0
China	3
19 November – Bacolod
Japan	0
Chinese Taipei	2

Final
21 November – Bacolod
China	3
Chinese Taipei	0
Third place
21 November – Bacolod
North Korea	3
Japan	2

=== Semi-final ===
19 November 1999

North Korea	0–3	China
		Wang Liping 18'; Liu Ailing 56'; Sun Wen 77'

Panaad Stadium, Bacolod
19 November 1999

Japan	0–2	Chinese Taipei
		Chen Shu-Chiung 31' (pen.); Lin Chi-I 33'

Panaad Stadium, Bacolod

=== Third place match ===
21 November 1999

North Korea	3–2	Japan
Pak Jong-ae 11'; Jin Pyol-hui 28'; Sin Kum-ok 51'		Otake 52', 69'

Panaad Stadium, Bacolod

=== Final ===
21 November 1999

China	3–0	Chinese Taipei
Wang Liping 16'; Liu Ying 42', 44'	Report

Panaad Stadium, Bacolod
Attendance: 7,000

== Winner ==
AFC Women's Championship
1999 winners

China
Seventh title
