= Nozima Kamoltoeva =

Uzbekistani football and futsal player

Personal information
- Full name: Nozima Kamoltoeva
- Date of birth: 19 September 1998 (age 28)
- Place of birth: Akkurgan, Uzbekistan
- Position: Defender

Team information
- Current team: Metallurg

Senior career*
Years	Team	Apps	(Gls)
- Metallurg

International career^{‡}
2016–2017	Uzbekistan U19	6	(0)
2017–	Uzbekistan	3	(0)
2018	Uzbekistan (futsal)	?	(0)
- * Club domestic league appearances and goals ‡ National team caps and goals as of 9 May 2018

Nozima Kamoltoeva (born 19 September 1998) is an Uzbekistani footballer who plays as a defender for the Women's Championship club Metallurg. She is also a futsal player, and represented Uzbekistan internationally in both football and futsal.

== Club career ==
Kamoltoeva has played for Metallurg in Uzbekistan.

== International career ==
Kamoltoeva has been capped for Uzbekistan at senior level in both football and futsal. In football, she represented Uzbekistan at two AFC U-19 Women's Championship qualifications (2015 and 2017) and the 2018 AFC Women's Asian Cup qualification.

In futsal, Kamoltoeva played for Uzbekistan at the 2018 AFC Women's Futsal Championship.
