= Gaëlle Thalmann =

Swiss footballer (born 1986)

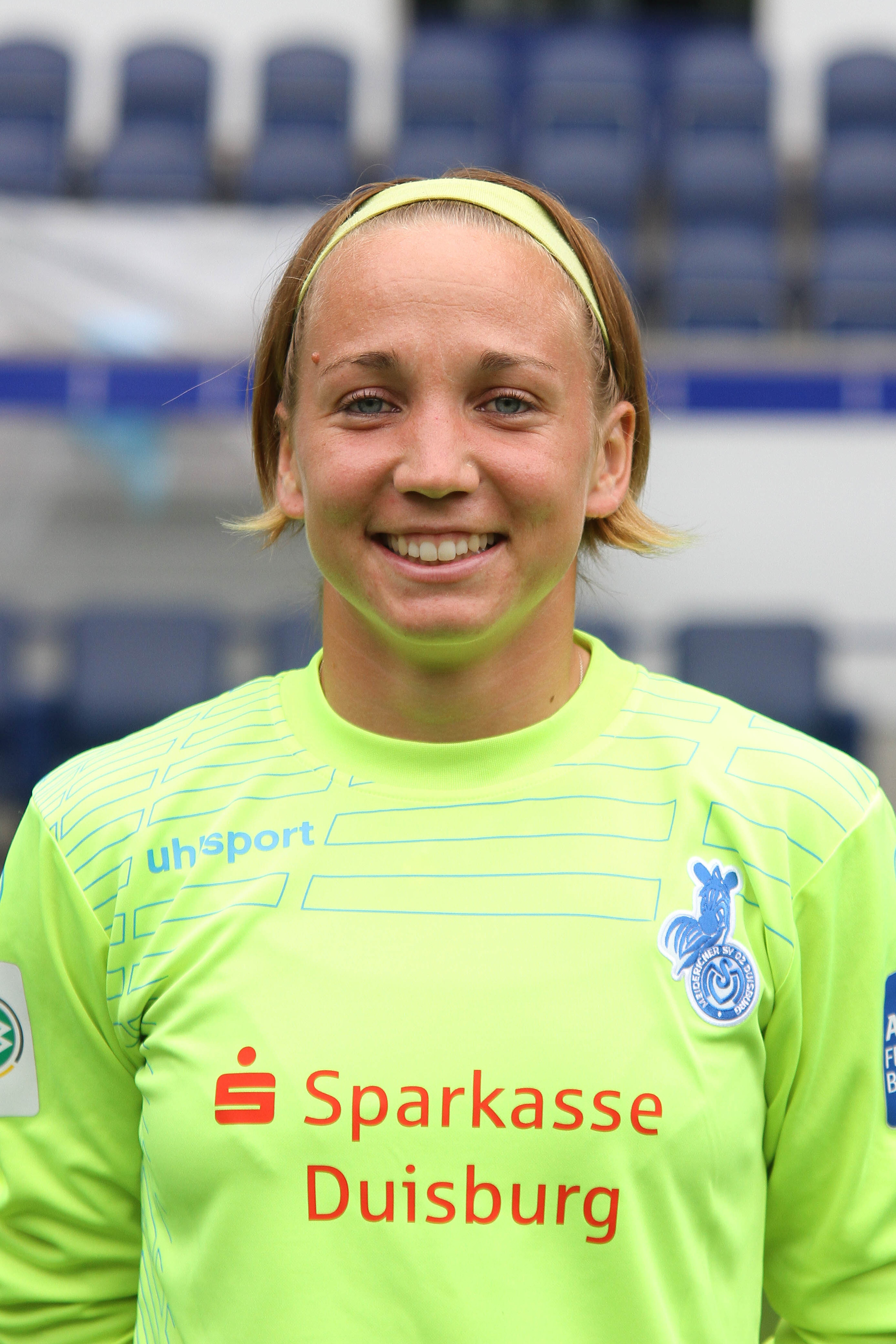
- Thalmann with MSV Duisburg in 2014

Personal information
- Full name: Gaëlle Thalmann
- Date of birth: 18 January 1986 (age 40)
- Place of birth: Bulle, Switzerland
- Height: 1.70 m (5 ft 7 in)
- Position: Goalkeeper

Youth career
- 1995–2000: FC Bulle
- 2000–2002: FC Riaz
- 2002–2003: FC Vétroz

Senior career*
Years	Team	Apps	(Gls)
2003–2004	Rot-Schwarz Thun		
2004–2006	FFC Zuchwil 05		
2006–2008	SC LUwin.ch		
2008–2009	Turbine Potsdam	3	(0)
2009–2010	Hamburger SV	3	(0)
2010–2011	Grasshopper Club	17	(0)
2011–2012	Lokomotive Leipzig	2	(0)
2012–2014	Torres Calcio Femminile	44	(0)
2014–2015	MSV Duisburg	8	(0)
2015–2016	FC Basel	9	(0)
2016	Fiorentina	9	(0)
2016–2017	AGSM Verona	20	(0)
2017–2018	Atalanta Mozzanica	20	(0)
2018–2019	Sassuolo	21	(0)
2019–2021	Servette FC Chênois	47	(0)
2021–2023	Real Betis	47	(0)

International career^{‡}
2007–2023	Switzerland	109	(0)
- * Club domestic league appearances and goals as of 31 July 2023 ‡ National team caps and goals as of 27 February 2025

Gaëlle Thalmann (born 18 January 1986) is a Swiss former professional footballer who played as a goalkeeper.

== Club career ==
Thalmann started her career at the age of nine with FC Bulle on a boys' team coached by her father. She played forward at this time and later switched to goalkeeper at age 14, when she advanced to the women's team FC Riaz. Two years later she joined FC Vétroz in Nationalliga B, the second highest tier of football in Switzerland.

Her first senior camp was FC Rot-Schwarz Thun, where she suffered a serious anterior cruciate ligament injury. After one year, she switched to FFC Zuchwil 05, with whom she became vice-champion and league cup winner in 2006. This was followed by a move to FC Luzern Frauen. After a trial at 1. FFC Turbine Potsdam, she signed a contract there on 8 January 2008 until 30 June 2009, joining the Bundesliga, the top league of football in Germany. Her first Bundesliga game was completed on 24 February 2008 in an away game against Hamburger SV. In 2009 she won with her team the DFB indoor cup and the German Championship. For the 2009/10 season she moved to Hamburger SV. In 2010 she returned to Switzerland, with Grasshopper. She played with 1. FC Lokomotive Leipzig, and then joined top level Italian Serie A club ASD Torres. In the summer of 2014 she moved to MSV Duisburg. After MSV Duisburg's relegation to the second division, Thalmann returned to Switzerland and signed for FC Basel. In 2016 she moved to the Italian league for A.S.D. Bardolino Verona C.F. In the summer of 2019 she left Italy to return to Switzerland, to Servette Chênois. She played at Servette Chênois for two seasons, before moving to Real Betis in Spain in July 2021.

Following the 2023 FIFA Women's World Cup, Thalmann retired from football.

== International career ==
Thalmann played her first international match with the Swiss U19 national team on 6 October 2002 in the match won by Switzerland 5-0 against the selection of Hungary in the first qualifying round for the UEFA European U19 Championship. She took part in the U20 World Cup in Russia.

Thalmann represents Switzerland on a senior level since 17 June 2007. Her debut was in a friendly match, playing for one half against Sweden. Stenia Michel took over as Switzerland's first-choice goalkeeper in the run up to the 2015 FIFA World Cup, when Thalmann had her anterior cruciate ligament injury. Thalmann took part in the 2022 European Championship and played in goal for the Swiss team in all three group games. Switzerland was eliminated after the preliminary round.

On 11 July 2023, she was included in the 23-player squad for the 2023 FIFA Women's World Cup in Australia and New Zealand. In the second group game of the Women's World Cup against Norway, Thalmann had a Player of the Match performance with four saves that held Switzerland onto a 0–0 draw.

== Honours ==
=== Club ===
- Frauen-Bundesliga: 2008–09
- Serie A: 2012–13
- Swiss Women's Cup: 2005–06
- DFB-Pokal Frauen: 2009
- Supercoppa Italiana: 2012, 2013

=== International ===
- Cyprus Women's Cup: 2017

=== Individual ===
- Award for sporting merit in the Canton of Fribourg
