= Sara Eggesvik =

Filipino footballer (born 1997)

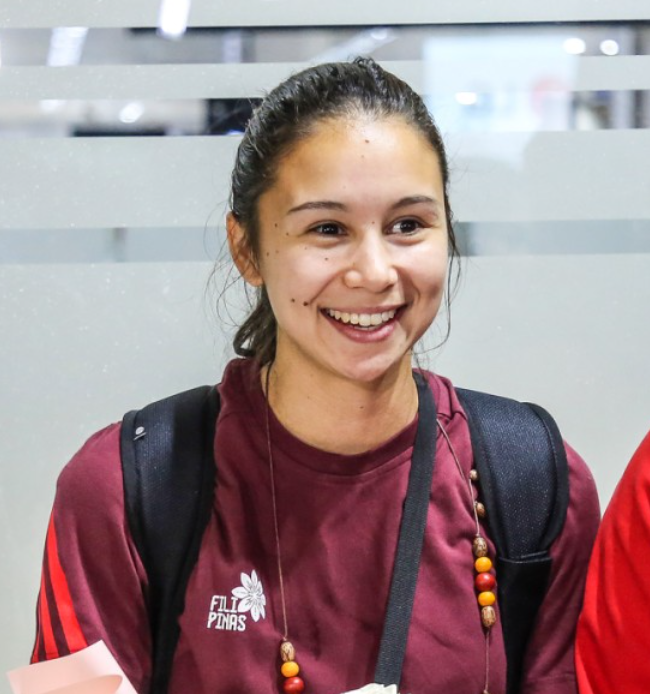
- Eggesvik in 2023

Personal information
- Full name: Sara Kristine Bantan Eggesvik
- Date of birth: 29 April 1997 (age 29)
- Place of birth: Bodø, Norway
- Height: 1.73 m (5 ft 8 in)
- Position: Midfielder

Team information
- Current team: LSK Kvinner
- Number: 3

Youth career
- 2007–2014: Grand Bodø

Senior career*
Years	Team	Apps	(Gls)
2014–2018	Grand Bodø	89	(7)
2019–2020	Charlton Athletic	10	(1)
2019	→ Grand Bodø (loan)	6	(0)
2020–2021	KIL/Hemne	24	(3)
2022	Malvik	12	(5)
2023–2024	KIL/Hemne	29	(5)
2024–2025	Western United	19	(2)
2025–	LSK Kvinner	32	(2)

International career^{‡}
2016	Norway U19	2	(0)
2018	Norway U23	2	(0)
2022–	Philippines	55	(7)
Medal record
Women's football
Representing the Philippines
AFF Women's Championship
Winner	2022 Philippines	Team
Southeast Asian Games
Gold medal – first place	2025 Thailand	Team
- * Club domestic league appearances and goals as of 7 November 2026 ‡ National team caps and goals as of 19 March 2026

Sara Kristine Bantan Eggesvik (born 29 April 1997) is a professional footballer who plays as a midfielder for Toppserien club LSK Kvinner. Born in Norway, she represents the Philippines at international level.

== Personal life ==
Eggesvik was born in Bodø Municipality, Norway, to a Norwegian father and a Filipino mother from the Davao Region. Eggesvik credits her older brother for introducing her to football, and she was encouraged to take up the sport after witnessing him play throughout their youth. She regularly visits her maternal relatives in Davao during the holiday season.

Eggesvik is a medical student. However, she said that she is considering delaying her studies to focus on her football career.

== Club career ==
=== Youth ===
The Bodø-born Eggesvik had her youth career at Grand Bodø.

=== Grand Bodø ===
In 2014, Eggesvik was promoted to the first team of Grand Bodø. At 17 years and 10 days old, she made her debut for the club in a 3–0 defeat against LSK Kvinner. She made a total of 103 appearances for the club, scoring 8 goals.

=== Charlton Athletic ===
In January 2019, Eggesvik joined Women's Championship club Charlton Athletic on a free transfer.

==== Loan to Grand Bodø ====
In May 2019, Eggesvik was sent back on loan to her previous club.

=== KIL/Hemne ===
In 2020, Eggesvik returned to Norway and joined KIL/Hemne.

=== Malvik ===
In 2022, Eggesvik joined Adressa-ligaen 3. div. women club Malvik.

=== Western United ===
In August 2024, Eggesvik joined Australian club Western United. A year later at the end of the season, the club announced her departure.

=== LSK Kvinner ===
In August 2025, Eggesvik joined Norwegian club LSK Kvinner.

== International career ==
Eggesvik was born in Norway to a Norwegian father and a Filipina mother, making her eligible to play for either Norway or the Philippines at international level.

=== Norway youth ===
Eggesvik has represented Norway's women at the under-19 and under-23 levels.

==== U-19 ====
In January 2016, Eggesvik was one of the 20 players who were called up for the international friendlies against England U-19. She made her debut for Norway U-19 in a 1–0 win against England U-19, coming in as a substitute and replacing Nora Eide Lie in the 66th minute of the match.

==== U-23 ====
In August 2018, Eggesvik was called up for the 2018 Under-23 Women's Nordic Tournament matches against England, Sweden and the United States. She made her debut for Norway in a 2–0 win against Sweden, coming on as a substitute for Andrea Norheim in the 61st minute of the match.

=== Philippines ===
In June 2022, Eggesvik was included in the Philippines squad for a training camp in Europe in preparation for the 2022 AFF Women's Championship on home soil.

Eggesvik made her debut for the Philippines in a 3–0 win against Bosnia and Herzegovina. A minute after coming in as a substitute replacing Quinley Quezada in the 81st minute, Eggesvik assisted Sarina Bolden's second goal of the match. In the second match against Bosnia, Eggesvik also came on as a substitute with the Philippines 1–0 down. From a corner, it was her cross that found Quinley Quezada who scored the equalizer in the 85th minute. The Philippines would eventually win 2–1.

Eggesvik scored her first international goal for the Philippines in a 7–0 win against Singapore in the 2022 AFF Women's Championship.

In the Philippines's second Group A match against New Zealand in the 2023 FIFA Women's World Cup, Eggesvik made an assist for the Philippine's first World Cup goal. Eggesvik's cross was headed into the goal by Sarina Bolden in the 24th minute of the match.

== Career statistics ==
=== Club ===
As of 7 November 2026

Appearances and goals by club, season and competition
Club	Season	League			National Cup (Note: Includes Norwegian Women's Cup)		League Cup (Note: Includes FA Women's League Cup)		Other		Total	
Club	Season	Division	Apps	Goals	Apps	Goals	Apps	Goals	Apps	Goals	Apps	Goals
Grand Bodø	2014	Toppserien	3	0	0	0	—		—		3	0
Grand Bodø	2015	1. divisjon	21	1	3	0	—		2	0	26	1
Grand Bodø	2016	1. divisjon	22	6	3	0	—		—		25	6
Grand Bodø	2017	Toppserien	21	0	3	0	—		2	1	26	1
Grand Bodø	2018	Toppserien	22	0	1	0	—		—		23	0
Grand Bodø	Total		89	7	10	0	0	0	4	1	103	8
Charlton Athletic	2018–19	Championship	3	0	0	0	0	0	—		3	0
Charlton Athletic	2019–20	Championship	7	1	0	0	5	0	—		12	1
Charlton Athletic	Total		10	1	0	0	5	0	0	0	15	1
Grand Bodø (loan)	2019	1. divisjon	6	0	1	1	—		—		7	1
KIL/Hemne	2020	1. divisjon	13	2	2	1	—		—		15	3
KIL/Hemne	2021	1. divisjon	11	1	2	0	—		—		13	1
KIL/Hemne	Total		24	3	4	1	0	0	0	0	28	4
Malvik	2022	3. divisjon	12	5	0	0	—		2	0	14	5
KIL/Hemne	2023	1. divisjon	13	0	0	0	—		4	0	17	0
KIL/Hemne	2024	1. divisjon	16	5	1	0	—		—		17	5
KIL/Hemne	Total		29	5	1	0	0	0	4	0	34	5
Western United	2024–25	A-League	19	2	—		—		—		19	2
LSK Kvinner	2025	Toppserien	13	1	0	0	—		—		13	1
LSK Kvinner	2026	Toppserien	19	1	3	1	0	0	0	0	22	2
LSK Kvinner	Total		32	2	3	1	0	0	0	0	36	3
Career total			211	24	19	3	5	0	10	1	245	28

=== International goals ===
Scores and results list the Philippines' goal tally first.

#	Date	Venue	Opponent	Score	Result	Competition
1.	6 July 2022	Rizal Memorial Stadium, Manila, Philippines	Singapore	5–0	7–0	2022 AFF Women's Championship
2.	9 July 2022	Rizal Memorial Stadium, Manila, Philippines	Malaysia	1–0	4–0	2022 AFF Women's Championship
3.	15 December 2022	Wanderers Football Park, Sydney, Australia	Papua New Guinea	1–0	9–0	Friendly
4.	28 September 2023	Wenzhou Sports Center Stadium, Wenzhou, China	Myanmar	2–0	3–0	2022 Asian Games
5.	28 September 2023	Wenzhou Sports Center Stadium, Wenzhou, China	Myanmar	3–0	3–0	2022 Asian Games
6.	8 April 2025	Theyab Awana Stadium, Dubai, United Arab Emirates	United Arab Emirates	1–0	4–0	Friendly
7.	8 March 2026	Gold Coast Stadium, Gold Coast, Australia	Iran	1–0	2–0	2026 Women's Asian Cup

== Honours ==
Grand Bodø

- 1. divisjon: 2016; runner-up: 2015

Philippines

- AFF Women's Championship: 2022
- Southeast Asian Games: 2025
