= Pak Jong-ae =

North Korean footballer

Personal information
- Date of birth: 3 April 1974 (age 52)
- Position: Midfielder

International career^{‡}
Years	Team	Apps	(Gls)
	North Korea	2	(0)
- ‡ National team caps and goals as of 29 June 1999 (before the 1999 FIFA Women's World Cup)

Pak Jong-ae (born 3 April 1974) is a North Korean women's international footballer who plays as a midfielder. She is a member of the North Korea women's national football team. She was part of the team at the 1999 FIFA Women's World Cup.
