= 1995 AFC Women's Championship =

Kejohanan Wanita AFC 1995

Tournament details
- Host country: Malaysia
- Dates: 23 September – 2 October
- Teams: 11 (from 1 confederation)

Final positions
- Champions: China (5th title)
- Runners-up: Japan
- Third place: Chinese Taipei
- Fourth place: South Korea

Tournament statistics
- Matches played: 19
- Goals scored: 102 (5.37 per match)
- Top scorer(s): (China) Shi Guihong (10 goals)
- Best player: (China) Zhao Lihong

The 1995 AFC Women's Championship was held from 23 September to 2 October 1995 in Malaysia. The tournament was won by for the fifth consecutive time by China in the final against Japan.

== Group stage ==
=== Group A ===
Team	Pld	W	D	L	GF	GA	GD	Pts
China	3	3	0	0	40	0	+40	9
Hong Kong	3	1	1	1	2	12	−10	4
Kazakhstan	3	0	2	1	0	7	−7	2
Philippines	3	0	1	2	0	23	−23	1

Source: RSSSF
24 September 1995

China	21–0	Philippines
Sun Wen 2', 33', 82'; Fan Chunling (3x); Li Yating (2x); Chen Yufeng; Zhao Lihong; Shui Qingxia; Wei Haiying (5x); Shi Guihong (5x)	Report

Kota Kinabalu
24 September 1995

Hong Kong	0–0	Kazakhstan
	Report

Kota Kinabalu

26 September 1995

Kazakhstan	0–0	Philippines

Kota Kinabalu
26 September 1995

China	12–0	Hong Kong
Shi Guihong 2', 7'; Wei Haiying 11', 48', 71'; Zhao Lihong 14'; Sun Qingmei 32', 39', 46'; Wen Lirong 36'; Liu Ailing 85'; Fan Chunling 88'	Report

Kota Kinabalu

28 September 1995

China	7–0	Kazakhstan
Wei Haiying 8'; Shi Guihong 34', 73' (pen.), 88'; Wen Lirong 57'; Li Yating 84'; Wang Liping 89'	Report

Kota Kinabalu
28 September 1995

Hong Kong	2–0	Philippines

Kota Kinabalu

=== Group B ===
Team	Pld	W	D	L	GF	GA	GD	Pts
Chinese Taipei	2	2	0	0	11	0	+11	6
Thailand	2	1	0	1	3	4	−1	3
Malaysia	2	0	0	2	1	11	−10	0

Source: RSSSF
23 September 1995

Chinese Taipei	3–0	Thailand
Lin Chi-I 2'; Huang Yu-chuan 57' (pen.), 84'	Report

Kota Kinabalu

25 September 1995

Chinese Taipei	8–0	Malaysia
Hung Mei-hsui 1', 15'; Lan Lan-fen 25'; Huang Yu-chuan; Chen Shu-chin	Report

Kota Kinabalu

27 September 1995

Thailand	3–1	Malaysia
Thongdum 35'; Prapussorn 55'; Manee 69'		Tindil 25'

Kota Kinabalu

=== Group C ===
Team	Pld	W	D	L	GF	GA	GD	Pts
Japan	3	3	0	0	24	0	+24	9
South Korea	3	2	0	1	11	1	+10	6
Uzbekistan	3	1	0	2	1	23	−22	3
India	3	0	0	3	0	12	−12	0

Source: RSSSF
23 September 1995

Japan	1–0	South Korea
Sawa 61'	Report

Kota Kinabalu
23 September 1995

Uzbekistan	1–0	India

Kota Kinabalu

25 September 1995

Japan	6–0	India
Obe; Otake; Takeoka; Nagamine

Kota Kinabalu
25 September 1995

South Korea	6–0	Uzbekistan

Kota Kinabalu

27 September 1995

South Korea	5–0	India

Kota Kinabalu
27 September 1995

Japan	17–0	Uzbekistan
Toumei; Otake; Noda; Takeoka; Uchiyama

Kota Kinabalu

=== Best teams in second place ===
In 4 team groups record against the bottom team was excluded.

Team	Pld	W	D	L	GF	GA	GD	Pts
South Korea	2	1	0	1	6	1	+5	3
Thailand	2	1	0	1	3	4	−1	3
Hong Kong	2	0	1	1	0	12	−12	1

Source: RSSSF

== Knockout stage ==
Semi-finals
30 September
Japan	3
Chinese Taipei	0
30 September
China	4
South Korea	0

Final
2 October
China	2
Japan	0
Third place
2 October
Chinese Taipei (a.e.t.) (p)	0 (3)
South Korea	0 (0)

=== Semi-final ===
30 September 1995

Japan	3–0	Chinese Taipei
Uchiyama 37'; Toumei 53'; Noda 83'

Kota Kinabalu

30 September 1995

China	4–0	South Korea
Sun Wen 17'; Sun Qingmei 31'; Wen Lirong 33'; Shui Qingxia 69'

Kota Kinabalu

=== Third place match ===
2 October 1995

Chinese Taipei	0–0	South Korea
Penalties
	3–0

Kota Kinabalu

=== Final ===
2 October 1995

China	2–0	Japan
Sun Wen 73'; Fan Yunjie 79'	Report

Kota Kinabalu

== Winner ==
AFC Women's Championship
1995 winners

China
Fifth title
