= Mai Aizawa (footballer) =

Japanese footballer (born 1980)

Mai Aizawa 相澤 舞衣
Personal information
- Date of birth: September 10, 1980 (age 46)
- Place of birth: Mie, Japan
- Height: 1.64 m (5 ft 4 1/2 in)
- Position: Midfielder

Youth career
- 1996–1998: Yokkaichi Nishi High School

Senior career*
Years	Team	Apps	(Gls)
1999–2010	Speranza FC Takatsuki	148	(52)
Total		148	(52)

International career
1999–2002	Japan	5	(4)
Medal record
Representing Japan
Asian Games
Bronze medal – third place	2002 Busan	Team
- * Club domestic league appearances and goals

Mai Aizawa (相澤 舞衣, Aizawa Mai; born September 10, 1980) is a former Japanese football player. She played for the Japan national team.

== Club career ==
Aizawa was born in Mie Prefecture on September 10, 1980. After graduating from high school, she joined Matsushita Electric Panasonic Bambina (later Speranza FC Takatsuki) in 1999. In the 1999 season, she was selected for the Best Young Player awards. She retired in 2010.

== National team career ==
In November 1999, when Aizawa was 19 years old, she was selected for the Japan national team for 1999 AFC Championship. At this competition, on November 12, she debuted and scored 3 goals against Nepal. She also played at the 2002 Asian Games. She played 5 games and scored 4 goals for Japan until 2002.

== National team statistics ==
Japan national team
Year	Apps	Goals
1999	3	4
2000	0	0
2001	0	0
2002	2	0
Total	5	4
