= Friday Camaclang =

Filipino football player

Personal information
- Birth name: Andrea Friday Mancuyas Camaclang
- Height: 1.55 m (5 ft 1 in)
- Position: Midfielder

Youth career
- 1989–1995: Colegio de San Agustin

College career
Years	Team	Apps	(Gls)
1996–1999	University of the Philippines		
2003–2005	Los Angeles Valley College		

Senior career*
Years	Team	Apps	(Gls)
- Riptide F.C.
- North Hollywood Extreme
- F.C. Los Angeles
2006–?	Brighton & Hove Albion W.F.C.		

International career
1996–2007	Philippines	?	(~2)
- * Club domestic league appearances and goals

Friday Camaclang is a Filipino football player. Camaclang was a member of the Philippine women's national team. She played for Brighton & Hove Albion W.F.C. of the FA Women's Premier League in England.

== Early career ==
Camaclang played high school varsity in Collegio de San Agustin in Makati. She first played football at age three and her skills were further honed at the Makati football school. There she was able to play in international competitions such as the Helsinki Cup in Finland, the Gothia Cup in Sweden and the Pondus Cup in Denmark.

She also played for the varsity team of the University of the Philippines.

== Club career ==
Seeking to play a more tactical style of football, Camaclang went to the United States where she got involved with the Penn State to University of Portland and the Women's Soccer Association.

She joined minor clubs in the United States, FC Los Angeles, North Hollywood Extreme and semi-pro team Riptide F.C. She then enrolled for further studies in Los Angeles Valley College, then joining its women's soccer team.

In 2006, she signed with Brighton & Hove Albion W.F.C. of the FA Women's Premier League to play for them at least in the 2006-07 season.

== International career ==
Camaclang first joined the Philippine national team in 1996. She was part of the Philippine squad that participated at the 1999 AFC Women's Championship where she scored two goals against Nepal. She underwent a two-month training in the United States before the tournament. She also played at the Southeast Asian Games.
