= Alicia Barker =

Filipino footballer (born 1998)

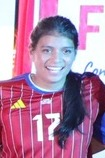

Personal information
- Full name: Alicia Balicoco Barker
- Date of birth: May 22, 1998 (age 28)
- Place of birth: Kirkland, Washington, U.S.
- Height: 5 ft 7 in (1.70 m)
- Position: Defender

Team information
- Current team: Salmon Bay
- Number: 17

Youth career
- FC Alliance
- Inglemoor High School

College career
Years	Team	Apps	(Gls)
2016–2019	Illinois Fighting Illini	75	(0)

Senior career*
Years	Team	Apps	(Gls)
2022–2024	Pacific Northwest SC	0	(0)
2025–	Salmon Bay	7	(0)

International career^{‡}
2022–	Philippines	16	(0)
- * Club domestic league appearances and goals as of June 29, 2025 (UTC) ‡ National team caps and goals as of November 1, 2023 (UTC)

Alicia Balicoco Barker (born May 22, 1998) is a professional footballer who plays as a defender for Salmon Bay. Born in the United States, she represents the Philippines at international level.

== Early life ==
Barker was born in Woodinville, Washington. She began playing soccer at four years old as a part of the Northshore Youth Soccer Association, where her father was her first coach. She was a part of the Washington State's Elite Player Development Program, which is organized by the United States Youth Soccer Association.

Barker played soccer while attending Inglemoor High School.

== College career ==
=== University of Illinois Urbana-Champaign ===
Barker played collegiate soccer at University of Illinois Urbana-Champaign in NCAA Division I. She started in seventy-five games and won All-Big Ten Second Team Defender, United Soccer Coaches Association Scholar All-North/Central Region Second Team, and USCA All-North Region Third Team during her 2018 season.

== International career ==
Barker is eligible to represent either United States or Philippines at the international level.

=== Philippines ===
In December 2022, Barker was included in the Philippines squad for the national team's training camp in Australia. She made her debut in December 2022 for the Philippines in a 5–1 friendly win against Papua New Guinea. She continued to represent the Philippines for the 2023 FIFA Women's World Cup, starting all 3 games, including a historic win versus New Zealand in the nation's capital.
