= Fan Chunling =

Chinese footballer

Personal information
- Date of birth: 2 February 1972 (age 54)

International career
Years	Team	Apps	(Gls)
- China

Fan Chunling is a Chinese football player. She was part of the Chinese team at the 1999 FIFA Women's World Cup.
