= List of Taiwanese footballers =

This is a list of Taiwanese / Chinese Taipei football (soccer) players. Most players listed in this page have played for Taiwan national football team.

Contents:	Top - A B C D E F G H I J K L M N O P Q R S T U V W X Y Z - See also

* Spellings of some player names have yet been verified or confirmed.

== C ==
GK

- Chung Kuang-tien (鍾光田)

DF

- Chang Chih-chung (張志忠)
- Chang Wu-yeh (張武業)
- Chen Jeng-i (陳正一)
- Chen Yu-lin (陳俞霖)
- Cheng Yung-jen (鄭勇仁)

MF

- Chen Jiunn-ming (陳俊明)
- Chen Po-liang (陳柏良)
- Chen Yi-wei (陳毅維)

FW

- Chang Han (張涵)
- Chiang Ming-han (蔣明翰)
- Chiang Shih-lu (江世祿)
- Chuang Wei-lun (莊偉倫)
- Chu En-le (朱恩樂)

== F ==
MF

- Feng Pao-hsing (馮保興)

== H ==
GK

- Hsu Jen-feng (許人丰)

DF

MF

- Hung Kai-chun (黃楷峻)

FW

- Ho Ming-tsan (何明站)
- Hsu Chia-cheng (許家承)
- Huang Che-ming (黃哲明)
- Huang Wei-yi (黃瑋儀)

== J ==
DF

- Ju Wen-bin (朱文彬)

== K ==
DF

- Kao Hao-chieh (高豪傑)

MF

FW

== L ==
GK

- Lu Kun-chi (呂昆錡)

DF

- Lee Meng-chian (李盟乾)
- Lee Tai-lin (李泰麟)
- Lin Chia-sheng (林家聖)

MF

FW

- Lo Chih-an (羅志安)
- Lo Chih-en (羅志恩)

== P ==
GK

- Pan Wei-chih (潘威誌)

DF

== T ==
DF

- Tsai Hui-kai (蔡暉鎧)

MF

- Tsai Chih-chieh (蔡志傑)
- Tsai Hsien-tang (蔡憲棠)
- Tseng Tai-lin (曾台霖)
- Tu Chu-hsien (涂居賢)

FW

- Tai Hung-hsu (戴宏旭)

== W ==
GK

DF

- Wang Chih-sheng (王志聖)

MF

- Wu Pai-ho (吳百和)

FW

== X ==
DF

- Xavier Chen (陳昌源)

== Y ==
GK

- Yang Cheng-hsing (楊振興)
- Yeh Hsien-chung (葉獻中)

DF

== See also ==
- Taiwan national football team
- Taiwanese football clubs
