= 2005 Chinese Taipei National Football League =

National First Division Football League 2005
- League: National First Division Football League
- Sport: Association football
- Duration: March 19, 2005 - November 6, 2005

League
- League champions: Tatung F.C.
- Runners-up: Taiwan Power Company F.C.
- Top scorer: (Taiwan) Ho Ming-tsan (Taipower)

Enterprise Football League seasons
- ← 2004 2006 →

The 2005 season of the Chinese Taipei National Football League.

== League table ==
| Pos | Team | Pld | W | D | L | GF | GA | GD | Pts |
|---|---|---|---|---|---|---|---|---|---|
| 1 | Tatung | 14 | 13 | 1 | 0 | 45 | 6 | +39 | 40 |
| 2 | Taipower | 14 | 10 | 0 | 4 | 51 | 16 | +35 | 30 |
| 3 | Lukuang | 14 | 8 | 1 | 5 | 27 | 27 | 0 | 25 |
| 4 | Ming Chuan University | 14 | 6 | 5 | 3 | 32 | 16 | +16 | 23 |
| 5 | Taiwan P.E. College | 14 | 7 | 1 | 6 | 27 | 23 | +4 | 22 |
| 6 | Taipei P.E. College | 14 | 4 | 1 | 9 | 16 | 30 | −14 | 13 |
| 7 | San Chung | 14 | 2 | 0 | 12 | 13 | 62 | −49 | 6 |
| 8 | Ilan Youth | 14 | 1 | 1 | 12 | 14 | 45 | −31 | 4 |

== Results ==
=== Round 1 ===
March 19, 2005

| Taipower | 2 - 0 | Ilan Youth |
|---|---|---|
| 陳啟峰 4'; Ho Ming-tsan (yellow card) 18'; Chen Jiunn-ming 65' 徐明楓 (yellow card) 90' | (Report) |

Kaohsiung Municipal Chung Cheng Industrial Vocational High School, Kaohsiung City

March 19, 2005

| Tatung | 3 - 1 | San Chung |
|---|---|---|
| Chen Chung-tzu 28'; Lin Kuei-pin 29'; Chuang Wei-lun 36' | (Report) | 王建祥 51' (OG) |

Kaohsiung Municipal Chung Cheng Industrial Vocational High School, Kaohsiung City

March 19, 2005

| Ming Chuan University | 1 - 1 | Taipei P.E. College |
|---|---|---|
| Feng Pao-hsing 10' (pen) 李金聰 (yellow card) 63' | (Report) | 柯宏奇 60' |

Kaohsiung Municipal Chung Cheng Industrial Vocational High School, Kaohsiung City

March 19, 2005

| Taiwan P.E. College | 4 - 1 | Lukuang |
|---|---|---|
| Chang Han 1'; Lin Chi-fu 42'; Huang Cheng-tsung 44'; Huang Cheng-tsung 79' (pen) | (Report) | Kuo Chun-yi 68' 阮俊杉 (red card) 87' |

Kaohsiung Municipal Chung Cheng Industrial Vocational High School, Kaohsiung City

=== Round 2 ===
March 26, 2005

| Ilan Youth | 0 - 1 | Taipei P.E. College |
|---|---|---|
| | (Report) | 王政銘 (yellow card) 28' 王政銘 68' |

Taichung Football Field, Taichung City

March 26, 2005

| Tatung | 2 - 0 | Lukuang |
|---|---|---|
| Chen Chung-tzu (yellow card) 16'; Chen Chung-tzu 33'; Tsai Hui-kai 80' | (Report) | Hsu Ching-mao (yellow card) 32'; Kao Hao-chieh (yellow card) 79' |

Taichung Football Field, Taichung City

March 26, 2005

| Ming Chuan University | 2 - 2 | Taiwan P.E. College |
|---|---|---|
| Chen Bing-shin 45'; Tseng Tai-lin 59'; Wang Yong-lun (yellow card) ?'; Feng Pao-hsing (yellow card) ?' | (Report) | Chang Han 37' 賴文啟 69' |

Taichung Football Field, Taichung City

March 26, 2005

| San Chung | 1 - 13 | Taipower |
|---|---|---|
| Tai Hung-hsu 67' 李冠毅 (yellow card) ?' | (Report) | Kuo Yin-hung 4'; Ho Ming-tsan 27'; Ho Ming-tsan 34'; Kuo Yin-hung 38'; Ho Ming-tsan 40'; Lee Meng-chian 43'; Kuo Yin-hung 44'; Lee Tai-lin 48'; Huang Wen-cheng 51'; Lee Meng-chian 54'; Chiang Shih-lu 63'; Chiang Shih-lu 79'; Chiang Shih-lu 88' |

Taichung Football Field, Taichung City

=== Round 3 ===
April 9, 2005
09:00

| Taipei P.E. College | 1 - 2 | Taiwan P.E. College |
|---|---|---|
| 柯宏奇 (yellow card) 48'; Lin Po-yuan 55' | (Report) | Chen Yu-lin 38'; Lin Chi-fu 69' 黃瑞瑩 (yellow card) 73' |

Pailing Sport Park, Taipei City
Referee: 楊木生

April 9, 2005
11:00

| Lukuang | 2 - 1 | Taipower |
|---|---|---|
| Liang Ju-nung 7'; Wu Pai-ho 92' | (Report) | Ho Ming-tsan 31'; Chen Chun-chieh (yellow card) 43' (yellow-red card) 77'; Ho Ming-tsan (yellow card) 91' |

Pailing Sport Park, Taipei City
Referee: 劉松和

April 9, 2005
13:00

| San Chung | 2 - 7 | Ming Chuan University |
|---|---|---|
| 黃瑋 40' 周昀達 76' | (Report) | Feng Pao-hsing 5'; Chen Bing-shin 31'; Feng Pao-hsing 38'; Chang Fu-hsiang 48'; Chang Fu-hsiang 51' 金志城 71'; Tseng Tai-lin 91' (pen) |

Pailing Sport Park, Taipei City
Referee: 李奇祿

April 9, 2005
15:00

| Ilan Youth | 0 - 6 | Tatung |
|---|---|---|
| | (Report) | Hsu Chia-cheng 12'; Chuang Wei-lun 15'; Chen Chung-tzu 33'; Hsu Chia-cheng 43'; Hsu Chia-cheng 44'; Chen Po-han 68' |

Pailing Sport Park, Taipei City
Referee: 游銘訓

=== Round 4 ===
April 23, 2005

| Taipower | 3 - 0 | Taiwan P.E. College |

April 23, 2005

| Lukuang | 0 - 3 | Ming Chuan University |

April 23, 2005

| Taipei P.E. College | 2 - 3 | Tatung |

April 23, 2005

| San Chung | 2 - 1 | Ilan Youth |

=== Round 5 ===
June 11, 2005

| Taiwan P.E. College | 0 - 3 | Tatung |

June 11, 2005

| Lukuang | 4 - 2 | Ilan Youth |

June 11, 2005

| Taipei P.E. College | 1 - 0 | San Chung |

June 11, 2005

| Ming Chuan University | 0 - 2 | Taipower |

=== Round 6 ===
June 19, 2005

| Ming Chuan University | 1 - 1 | Ilan Youth |

June 19, 2005

| Taipower | 0 - 2 | Tatung |

June 19, 2005

| Taiwan P.E. College | 3 - 0 | San Chung |

June 19, 2005

| Lukuang | 2 - 0 | Taipei P.E. College |

=== Round 7 ===
June 25, 2005

| Ilan Youth | 3 - 4 | Taiwan P.E. College |

June 25, 2005

| Ming Chuan University | 1 - 1 | Tatung |

June 25, 2005

| San Chung | 1 - 4 | Lukuang |

June 25, 2005

| Taipower | 6 - 0 | Taipei P.E. College |

=== Round 8 ===
August 14, 2005

| Taipei P.E. College | 2 - 6 | Taipower |

August 14, 2005

| Lukuang | 4 - 2 | San Chung |

August 14, 2005

| Ming Chuan University | 2 - 0 | Taiwan P.E. College |

August 14, 2005

| Tatung | 7 - 1 | Ilan Youth |

=== Round 9 ===
August 21, 2005

| Ming Chuan University | 6 - 0 | Ilan Youth |

August 21, 2005

| Taipower | 8 - 2 | San Chung |

August 21, 2005

| Taiwan P.E. College | 0 - 2 | Taipei P.E. College |

August 21, 2005

| Tatung | 6 - 0 | Lukuang |

=== Round 10 ===
August 28, 2005

| Tatung | 1 - 0 | Ming Chuan University |

August 28, 2005

| Ilan Youth | 2 - 4 | Taipower |

August 28, 2005

| San Chung | 0 - 7 | Taiwan P.E. College |

August 28, 2005

| Taipei P.E. College | 1 - 2 | Lukuang |

=== Round 11 ===
September 4, 2005

| Ming Chuan University | 5 - 1 | San Chung |

September 4, 2005

| Taipei P.E. College | 1 - 2 | Tatung |

September 4, 2005

| Taiwan P.E. College | 2 - 1 | Ilan Youth |

September 4, 2005

| Taipower | 3 - 1 | Lukuang |

=== Round 12 ===
September 11, 2005

| Ming Chuan University | 0 - 2 | Taipower |

September 11, 2005

| Tatung | 2 - 0 | Taiwan P.E. College |

September 11, 2005

| Lukuang | 4 - 0 | Ilan Youth |

September 11, 2005

| San Chung | 0 - 1 | Taipei P.E. College |

=== Round 13 ===
September 18, 2005

| Lukuang | 1 - 1 | Ming Chuan University |

September 18, 2005

| Tatung | 5 - 0 | San Chung |

September 18, 2005

| Taipei P.E. College | 1 - 3 | Ilan Youth |

September 18, 2005

| Taiwan P.E. College | 2 - 1 | Taipower |

=== Round 14 ===
November 6, 2005
11:00

| San Chung | 1 - 0 | Ilan Youth |
|---|---|---|
| 洪賜丞 15' (pen) 林正邦 (yellow card) ?' | (Report) |

Chungshan Soccer Stadium, Taipei City
Referee: 粘三華

November 6, 2005
13:00

| Ming Chuan University | 3 - 2 | Taipei P.E. College |
|---|---|---|
| Tseng Tai-lin 29' 蔡志傑 49' 李金聰 92' | (Report) | Chiang Ming-han 45' 徐祥育 89'; Chang Wu-yeh (張武業) (yellow card) ?' |

Chungshan Soccer Stadium, Taipei City
Referee: 楊木生

November 6, 2005
15:00

| Taiwan P.E. College | 1 - 2 | Lukuang |
|---|---|---|
| Huang Cheng-tsung 91'; Tsai Sheng-an (yellow card) ?' | (Report) | 郭俊億 65'; Hsu Che-hao 68' |

Chungshan Soccer Stadium, Taipei City
Referee: 游銘訓

November 6, 2005
17:00

| Tatung | 2 - 0 | Taipower |
|---|---|---|
| Chuang Yao-tsung 29'; Huang Wei-yi 34'; Chen Chung-tzu (yellow card) ?' | (Report) | Lee Tai-lin (yellow card) ?' |

Chungshan Soccer Stadium, Taipei City
Referee: 高才虎

== Top goalscorers ==
| Scorer | Goals | Team |
|---|---|---|
| Ho Ming-tsan | 11 | Taipower |
| Huang Wei-yi | 9 | Tatung |
| Hsu Chia-cheng | 9 | Tatung |
| Chang Han | 9 | Taiwan P.E. College |
| Chiang Shih-lu | 8 | Taipower |

== All-star team ==
The following players were voted to be the greatest players in the 2005 season of the Chinese Taipei National Football League:

- Goalkeeper: Lu Kun-chi (Taiwan PE College)
- Right back: Tu Chu-hsien (Taipower)
- Left back: Chen Jeng-i (Tatung)
- Center backs: Lee Meng-chian (Taipower), Ju Wen-bin (Tatung)
- Right midfielder: Chang Fu-hsian (Ming Chuan)
- Left midfielder: Chuang Wei-lun (Tatung)
- Defensive midfielder: Tsai Hui-kai (Tatung)
- Attacking midfielder: Tseng Tai-lin (Ming Chuan)
- Strikers: Huang Wei-yi (Tatung), Ho Ming-tsan (Taipower)
