= List of Leopard Cat FC players =

This is a list of footballers who have played for Leopard Cat FC (formerly Tatung F.C.). It is a tradition in Tatung that new players do not replace old players' shirt numbers in honor of the club founders.

No.	Name	Chinese name	Position	Tatung career
101	Liao Hung-chih	廖洪趾	GK	?-present
126	Wu Chun-i	吳俊益	MF	?-present
133	Wang Shyh-kuen	王世坤	GK	?-present
137	Hsu Chia-cheng	許家承	FW	?–2008
147	Chen Chung-tzu	陳重志	MF	
153	Lin Kuei-pin	林貴彬	MF	
155	Chen Jeng-i	陳正一	DF	?–2008
158	Tsai Hsien-tang	蔡憲棠	DF	?-present
159	Ju Wen-bin	朱文彬	DF	?–2008
160	Kao Hao-chieh	高豪傑	DF	2000–present
163	Chuang Wei-lun	莊偉倫	FW	2003–present
164	Sheu Chinq-maw	許慶茂	DF	
165	Hung Chin-hwai	洪慶懷	DF	
166	Chang Chih-chung	張志忠	DF	
168	Chen Po-han	陳柏翰	MF	?–2008
169	Lin Hsin-yu	林信宇	FW	?–2008
170	Hou Sheng-chung	侯勝鐘	MF	?-2008
171	Huang Wei-yi	黃瑋儀	FW	2005–present
172	Chuang Yao-tsung	莊耀宗	FW	?–present
173	Chung Kuang-tien	鍾光田	GK	2006–present
174	Chang Wu-yeh	張武業	DF	2007–2008
175	Yu Chih-hung	游志宏	DF	2007–2008
176	Hsu Che-hao	許哲豪	MF	2007–present
177	Hsu Jen-feng	許人丰	GK	2007–present
178	Chang Fu-hsiang	張福祥	MF	2007–present
179	Tseng Tai-lin	曾台霖	MF	2007–2008
180	Chang Yung-hsien	張永憲	DF	2008–present
181	Chen Bing-shin	陳炳鑫	MF	2008–present
182	Lin Tsung-jen	林聰仁	MF	2008–present
183	Huang Jui-hao	黃瑞浩	MF	2008
184	Wang Chih-sheng	王志聖	DF	2008–present
185	Lin Che-ming	林哲民	DF	2008–present
186	Chang Han	張涵	FW	2009–present
187	Lin Chi-fu	林吉福	MF	2009–present
188	Hsueh Ming-wen	薛銘文		2009–present
