= 2006 Enterprise Football League =

Enterprise Football League 2006
- League: Enterprise Football League
- Sport: Football (soccer)
- Duration: June 9, 2006 - July 21, 2006

League
- League champions: Tatung F.C.
- Runners-up: Taiwan Power Company F.C.
- Top scorer: (Taiwan) Chiang Shih-lu (Taipower)

Enterprise Football League seasons
- ← 2005 2007 →

The 2006 season of the Fubon Enterprise Football League (formerly Chinese Taipei National Football League). Tatung F.C., as the winner of the season, will compete in the 2007 season of the AFC President's Cup, a club competition between football clubs of emerging nations in the Asian Football Confederation (AFC).

== League table ==
Pos	Team	Pld	W	D	L	GF	GA	GD	Pts	Qualification
1	Tatung	9	5	3	1	16	9	+7	18	AFC President's Cup
2	Taipower	9	6	0	3	17	11	+6	18	
3	China Steel	9	2	2	5	12	15	−3	8	
4	Fubon Financial	9	2	1	6	8	19	−11	7	

== Results ==
=== Round 1 ===
June 9, 2006
17:30

China Steel	1 - 2	Tatung
Tai Hung-hsu 84'	(Results)	Tsai Hui-kai 64'; Tsai Hui-kai 69'

Kaohsiung County Stadium, Fongshan City

June 9, 2006
19:30

Taipower	4 - 2	Fubon Financial
Kuo Yin-hung 18'; Chiang Shih-lu ?'; Chiang Shih-lu ?'; Pan Kuao-kai ?'	(Results)	Chuang Wei-lun 14'; Lin Po-yuan 25'

Kaohsiung County Stadium, Fongshan City

=== Round 2 ===
June 11, 2006
17:30

Taipower	0 - 4	Tatung
Tu Ming-feng (red card) 67'	(Results)	Huang Wei-yi 9'; Wu Chun-i 38' (pen); Wu Chun-i 68' (pen); Lin Kuei-pin ?'

Kaohsiung County Stadium, Fongshan City

June 11, 2006
19:30

China Steel	4 - 1	Fubon Financial
Chen Po-liang ?' (pen); Chen Po-liang ?' (pen) ? ?' ? ?'	(Results)	Huang Tzu-jung (黃子榮) (red card) 5'; Chang Fu-hsiang 15'; Chuang Wei-lun (red card) 67'

Kaohsiung County Stadium, Fongshan City

=== Round 3 ===
June 23, 2006
17:00

China Steel	0 - 2	Taipower
	(Results)	Chiang Shih-lu 57'; Huang Wen-cheng (黃文成) ?'

Chungshan Soccer Stadium, Taipei City

June 23, 2006
19:00

Tatung	1 - 0	Fubon Financial
Lin Kuei-pin 43'	(Results)

Chungshan Soccer Stadium, Taipei City

=== Round 4 ===
June 25, 2006
17:00

Fubon Financial	1 - 0	China Steel
Lin Po-yuan 70'; Wu Mung-tsung (yellow card) ?' (yellow-red card) 72'	(Results)

Chungshan Soccer Stadium, Taipei City

June 25, 2006
19:00

Tatung	2 - 1	Taipower
Tsai Hui-kai 75'; Tsai Hui-kai 83'	(Results)	Chen Jiunn-ming 66'

Chungshan Soccer Stadium, Taipei City

=== Round 5 ===
July 1, 2006
17:00

Fubon Financial	2 - 2	Tatung
Huang Tzu-jung (黃子榮) 55'; Chuang Wei-lun 68' (pen)	(Results)	Chuang Yao-tsung 6'; Hsu Chia-cheng 40'

Chungshan Soccer Stadium, Taipei City

July 1, 2006
19:00

Taipower	1 - 2	China Steel
Chen Jiunn-ming ?'	(Results)	Tai Hung-hsu ?'; Chen Yi-wei ?'

Chungshan Soccer Stadium, Taipei City

=== Round 6 ===
July 6, 2006
17:30

Fubon Financial	0 - 3	Taipower
	(Results)	Chang Fu-hsiang 25' (OG); Chiang Shih-lu ?'; Chiang Shih-lu ?'

Tainan Football Field, Tainan City

July 6, 2006
19:30

Tatung	3 - 3	China Steel
Yu Chih-hung 3'; Hsu Che-hao ?'; Chen Chung-tzu ?'	(Results)	Hung Chung-yu (洪仲宇) 28'; Chang Han 32'; Chen Yu-lin 75'

Tainan Football Field, Tainan City

=== Round 7 ===
July 16, 2006
17:30

Taipower	3 - 0	Fubon Financial
	(Results)

Kaohsiung County Stadium, Fongshan City

July 16, 2006
19:30

Tatung	1 - 1	China Steel
	(Results)

Kaohsiung County Stadium, Fongshan City

=== Round 8 ===
July 18, 2006
17:30

Tatung	1 - 0	Fubon Financial
	(Results)

Kaohsiung County Stadium, Fongshan City

July 18, 2006
19:30

Taipower	2 - 0	China Steel
	(Results)

Kaohsiung County Stadium, Fongshan City

=== Round 9 ===
July 21, 2006
17:30

China Steel	1 - 2	Fubon Financial

Kaohsiung County Stadium, Fongshan City

July 21, 2006
19:30

Tatung	0 - 1	Taipower

Kaohsiung County Stadium, Fongshan City

== Top goalscorers ==
Scorer	Goals	Team
Chiang Shih-lu	5	Taipower
Tsai Hui-kai	4	Tatung
Lin Po-yuan (林柏元)	2	Fubon Financial
Wu Chun-i (吳俊益)	2	Tatung
Lin Kuei-pin (林貴彬)	2	Tatung
Chen Po-liang	2	China Steel
