= 2008 Intercity Football League =

- League: Intercity Football League
- Sport: Association football
- Duration: August 23, 2008 - November 22, 2008

League
- League champions: Taiwan Power Company F.C.
- Runners-up: Chia Cheng Hsin
- Top scorer: (Chinese Taipei) Chen Po-liang (Chia Cheng Hsin)

Intercity Football League seasons
- ← 2007 2009 →

The 2008 season of Intercity Football League started from August 23, 2008. Taiwan Power Company F.C. won the league championship.

== Qualifications ==
Taipei City (Tatung F.C.), Tainan County, Yilan County, and Taipei County qualified for being the top 4 places in the 2007 season. Taiwan Power Company F.C., Bros, Chia Cheng Hsin, and Hualien County qualified through the qualification tournament held between July 19 and August 2.

== First stage ==
Pos	Team	Pld	W	D	L	GF	GA	GD	Pts
1	Taipower	7	5	1	1	14	5	+9	16
2	Chia Cheng Hsin (Taichung County)	7	4	1	2	26	10	+16	13
3	Tatung (Taipei City)	7	4	1	2	17	13	+4	13
4	Hun Sing (Tainan County)	7	3	2	2	11	10	+1	11
5	Bros	7	3	1	3	15	12	+3	10
6	Yilan County	7	3	1	3	13	17	−4	10
7	Taipei County	7	1	1	5	15	29	−14	4
8	Hualien County	7	1	0	6	17	32	−15	3

=== Results ===
Home \ Away	BRO	CCH	HLC	HS	TAT	TPC	POW	YLC
Bros		4–3	1–2			4–0		1–2
Chia Cheng Hsin (Taichung)			6–0				0–1	
Hualien County				1–2			0–2	
Hung Sing (Tainan County)	2–1				2–3	3–1	1–3	
Tatung (Taipei City)		2–4						4–0
Taipei County		2–9			0–3		1–1	
Taipower (Kaohsiung County)	2–3				3–0			
Yilan County		0–3	8–5	0–0		3–2		

Legend: Blue = home team win; Yellow = draw; Red = away team win.

== Second stage ==
Pos	Team	Pld	W	D	L	GF	GA	GD	Pts
1	Taipower	3	2	0	1	2	1	+1	6
2	Chia Cheng Hsin	3	2	0	1	6	2	+4	6
3	Hun Sing (Tainan County)	3	1	1	1	2	5	−3	4
4	Tatung (Taipei City)	3	0	1	2	2	4	−2	1

=== Results ===
No.	Date	Team 1	Result	Team 2	Ground
29	November 8, 2008	Taipower	0-1	Hun Sing	Chungshan Soccer Stadium
30	November 8, 2008	Chia Cheng Hsin	2-1	Tatung	Chungshan Soccer Stadium
31	November 15, 2008	Tatung	0-1	Taipower	Pailing Sport Park
32	November 15, 2008	Hun Sing	0-4	Chia Cheng Hsin	Pailing Sport Park
33	November 22, 2008	Taipower	1-0	Chia Cheng Hsin	National Pei Men Senior High School
34	November 22, 2008	Tatung	1-1	Hun Sing	National Pei Men Senior High School

== Home grounds ==
Team	Ground
Taipei City (Tatung)	N/a
Tainan County	National Pei Men Senior High School
Yilan County	National Yilan Senior High School
Taipei County	Taipei County Stadium
Taipower	N/a
Bros	N/a
Chia Cheng Hsin	Taichung Football Field
Hualien County	Hualien Stadium

== Awards ==
Golden Boot
(Chinese Taipei) Chen Po-liang (Chia Cheng Hsin) - 12 goals
Golden Ball
(Chinese Taipei) Chen Po-liang (Chia Cheng Hsin)
Best Manager
(Chinese Taipei) Chen Kuei-jen (Taipower)
Best XI

- Goalkeeper: (Chinese Taipei) Pan Wei-chih (Taipower)
- Defenders: (Chinese Taipei) Chen Yi-wei (Chia Cheng Hsin), (Chinese Taipei) Tsai Hsien-tang (Tatung), (Chinese Taipei) Lee Meng-chian (Taipower), (Chinese Taipei) Hsieh Meng-hsuan (Hun Sing)
- Midfielders: (Chinese Taipei) Huang Cheng-tsung (Hun Sing), (Chinese Taipei) Lin Kuei-pin (Tatung), (Chinese Taipei) Pan Kuao-kai (Taipower), (Chinese Taipei) Huang Kai-chun (Chia Cheng Hsin)
- Forwards: (Chinese Taipei) Kuo Yin-hung (Taipower), (Chinese Taipei) Chang Han (Hualien County)

Source: Chinese Taipei Football Association
