= Pan Wei-chih =

Taiwanese footballer

Personal information
- Full name: Pan Wei-chih (潘威誌)
- Date of birth: 13 July 1982 (age 44)
- Place of birth: Republic of China
- Height: 1.77 m (5 ft 10 in)
- Position: Goalkeeper

Team information
- Current team: Taipower
- Number: 1

Senior career*
| Years | Team | Apps | (Gls) |
- Taiwan PE College
- Fu Jen
| ?–2006 | Taipower | | |
| 2006–2008 | NSTC | | |
| 2008–present | Taipower | | |

International career
| 2003 | Chinese Taipei U-23 | 2 | (0) |
| 2005–present | Chinese Taipei | 3 | (0) |
| 2008–present | Chinese Taipei futsal | | |
- * Club domestic league appearances and goals

Pan Wei-chih (Chinese: 潘威誌; pinyin: Pān Wēizhì; born 13 July 1982) is a Taiwanese football (soccer) goalkeeper. He succeeded Yang Cheng-hsing to become Taiwan Power Company F.C.'s goalkeeper. He has been called up to the Chinese Taipei national football team. He is also the first-choice goalkeeper in the Chinese Taipei national futsal team.

== Career statistics ==
| Club | Season | League | | Asia | | Total | |
| Club | Season | Apps | Goals | Apps | Goals | Apps | Goals |
|---|---|---|---|---|---|---|---|
| Taipower | 2005 | ? | 0 | 3 | 0 | ? | 0 |
| NSTC | 2006 | ? | 0 | - | - | ? | 0 |
| NSTC | 2007 | ? | 0 | - | - | ? | 0 |
| Taipower | 2008 | ? | 0 | 2 | 0 | ? | 0 |
| Taipower | 2009 | ? | 0 | 1 | 0 | ? | 0 |
| Career totals | | ? | 0 | 6 | 0 | ? | 0 |
