= Fubon Financial F.C. =

Fubon Financial football club may refer to:

- The 2006 name of the Taiwan National Sports Training Center football team
- The 2007–2008 name of the Chinese Taipei national under-23 football team
