= Chang Han =

Taiwanese footballer

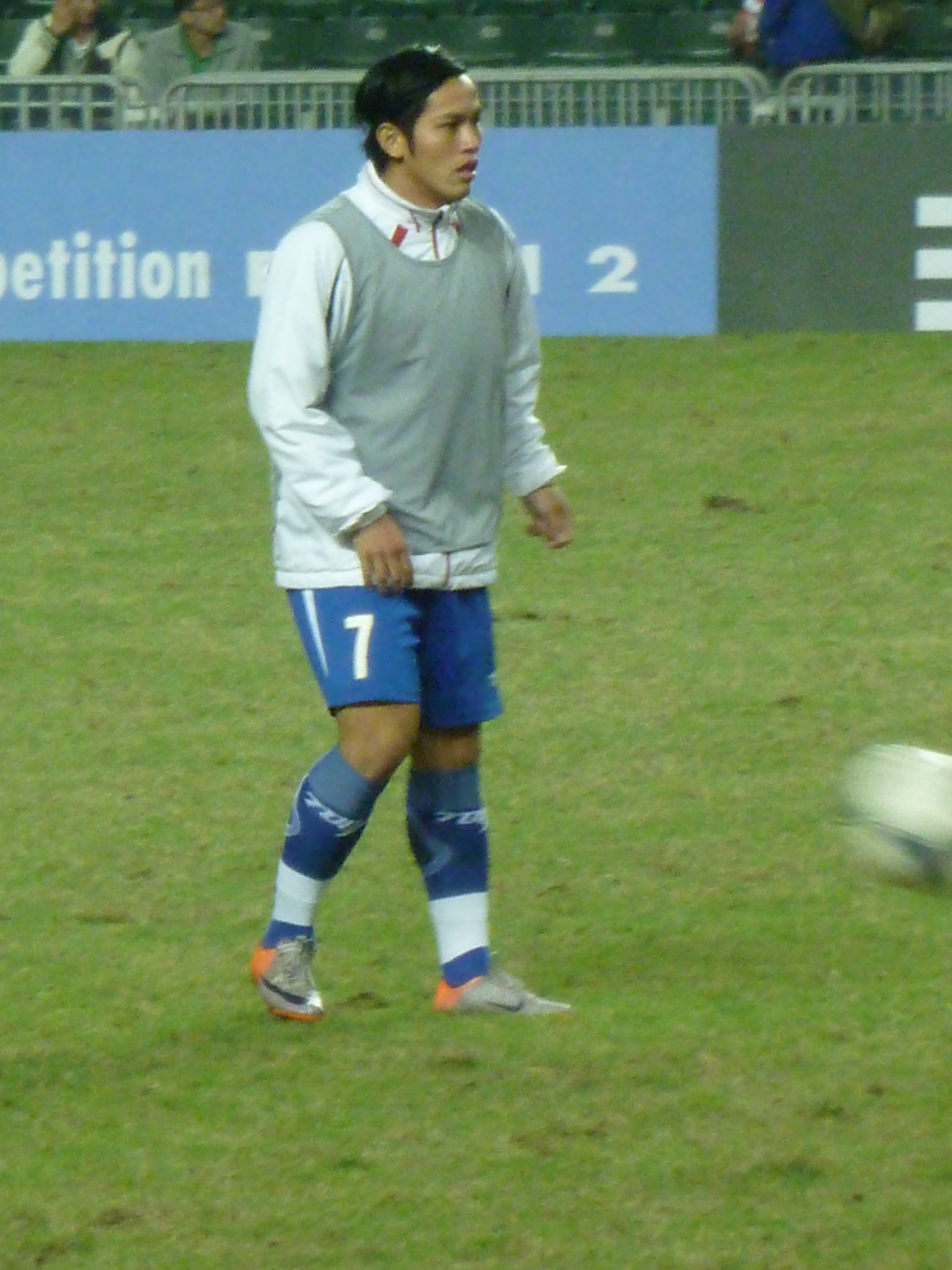

Personal information
- Full name: Chang Han (張涵)
- Date of birth: December 25, 1985 (age 40)
- Place of birth: Hualien, Taiwan, Republic of China
- Position: Striker

Youth career
- 1998–2001: Mei Lun JHS
- 2001–2004: Hualien Agriculture

Senior career*
Years	Team	Apps	(Gls)
2004–2008	Taiwan PE College		
2008	NSTC		
2009	Tatung		
2009–	NSTC		

International career
2007	Chinese Taipei U-23		
2008–	Chinese Taipei	21	(9)
2009–	Chinese Taipei futsal		
- * Club domestic league appearances and goals

Chang Han (Chinese: 張涵, born December 25, 1985, in Hualien) is a Taiwanese football player from Amis tribe. He usually plays as a striker. During the 2008 Summer Olympics qualifications, he was usually in the starting line-up in Chinese Taipei's 4–4–2 with Huang Wei-yi. In the 2010 East Asian Football Championship, with teammate Chan Che-yuan's assist, he headed Chinese Taipei's first goal against North Korea in the history.

Chang currently serves military service.

== International goals ==
Scores and results table. Chinese Taipei's goal tally first:

Goal	Date	Venue	Opponent	Score	Result	Competition
1.	4 April 2008	Chungshan Soccer Stadium, Taipei, Taiwan	Guam	1–1	1–4	2008 AFC Challenge Cup qualification
2.	6 April 2008	Chungshan Soccer Stadium, Taipei, Taiwan	Sri Lanka	0–1	2–2	2008 AFC Challenge Cup qualification
3.	4 April 2009	Sugathadasa Stadium, Colombo, Sri Lanka	Pakistan	1–0	1–1	2010 AFC Challenge Cup qualification
4.	8 August 2009	National Stadium, Kaohsiung, Taiwan	North Korea	1–1	1–2	2010 East Asian Football Championship
5.	10 September 2010	National Stadium, Kaohsiung, Taiwan	Macau	5–0	7–1	2010 Long Teng Cup
6.	10 February 2011	National Stadium, Kaohsiung, Taiwan	Laos	2–0	5–2	2012 AFC Challenge Cup qualification
7.	10 February 2011	National Stadium, Kaohsiung, Taiwan	Laos	5–0	5–2	2012 AFC Challenge Cup qualification
8.	3 July 2011	Taipei Municipal Stadium, Taipei, Taiwan	Malaysia	1–1	3–2	2014 FIFA World Cup qualification
9.	29 September 2012	Rizal Memorial Stadium, Manila, Philippines	Philippines	1–3	1–3	2012 Philippine Peace Cup

== Career statistics ==
Club	Season	League		Asia		Total	
Club	Season	Apps	Goals	Apps	Goals	Apps	Goals
Chinese Taipei U-23	2007	?	3	-	-	?	3
Taiwan PE College	2008	?	14	-	-	?	14
Tatung	2009	0	0	-	-	0	0
Career totals		?	17	0	0	?	17
