= Tseng Tai-lin =

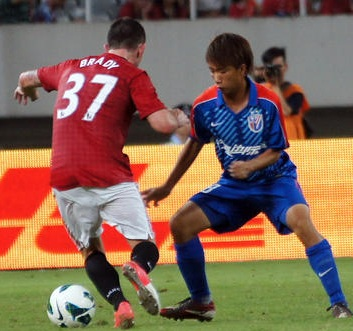

Personal information
- Full name: Tseng Tai-lin (曾台霖)
- Date of birth: May 14, 1982 (age 44)
- Place of birth: Taipei, Republic of China (Taiwan)
- Position: Midfielder

Team information
- Current team: Chinese Taipei U-23 (manager)

Senior career*
Years	Team	Apps	(Gls)
2001–2005	Ming Chuan Uni.		
2005–2007	NSTC		
2007–2008	Tatung		
2009–	Ming Chuan Uni.		

International career
2003–2004	Chinese Taipei U-23		
2003–2006	Chinese Taipei		
2003–???	Chinese Taipei futsal		

Managerial career
- 2023–: Chinese Taipei U-23
- * Club domestic league appearances and goals

Tseng Tai-lin (Chinese: 曾台霖, born in Taipei) is a Taiwanese retired football (soccer) and futsal player and the current Chinese Taipei U-23 coach.

Nicknamed Little Tiger, Tseng started to play football at Li Nong Elementary School (Chinese: 立農國小) in Taipei. His usual position is an attacking midfielder. He was once praised as "the best footballer in Taiwan" by then Yugoslavian coach of NSTC football team in 2003. He was also voted the best attacking midfielder during the Chinese Taipei National Football League 2005 season when he played for Ming Chuan University.

In addition to association football, Tseng is active in futsal as well. He has represented Chinese Taipei in many international futsal competitions.

However, a lasting ankle injury has influenced his performance in recent years. As a result, he was dropped from the Chinese Taipei squad during 2007 AFC Asian Cup qualifications in 2006.

From 2005 to 2007, he served in military service and played for Taiwan National Sports Training Center football team. After retiring from military service, he joined Tatung F.C. in shirt number 79.

Besides playing for Ming Chuan, he also serves as the team's assistant coach.
