= Chen Yulin =

Chen Yulin may refer to:

- Chen Yu-lin (Chinese: 陳俞霖; pinyin: Chén Yúlín, born 1985), Taiwanese footballer
- Tan Yock Lin (Chinese: 陳毓麟; pinyin: Chén Yùlín, 1952/53–2023), Singaporean law professor
