= 2009 Intercity Football League =

- League: Intercity Football League
- Sport: Association football
- Duration: February 14, 2009 - December 13, 2009

League
- League champions: Kaohsiung City Yoedy
- Runners-up: Kaohsiung Taipower FC

Intercity Football League seasons
- ← 2008 2010 →

The 2009 Intercity Football League season is the third since its establishment in 2007. It started from February 14, 2009.

At the end of 2008, the Chinese Taipei Football Association decided to merge the Enterprise Football League into the Intercity Football League, and therefore the latter became the highest-ranked football league in Taiwan.

The league included two divisions. Division A consisted of six teams, and the remaining teams participated in Division B. The last-placed team in Division A would be relegated to Division B while the champion of Division B would move up to Division A.

New league regulations required each team to be named after the administrative division in which they were located. Each team also needed two-thirds of its players to reside in the area for at least one month.

== Qualifications ==
Taipei City Tatung, Tainan County, and Kaohsiung Taipower automatically qualified for Division A after finishing in the top four places in the 2008 season. The remaining three Division A places were decided via a qualification tournament, which took place at the Pailing Sport Park January 1–4, 2009. There were six teams competing in the tournament: Miaoli County, Kaohsiung City, Kaohsiung City Yoedy (高市耀迪), Yilan County, Taipei County Hanchuang (北縣悍創), and Tainan City. Taipei County Hanchuang, Kaohsiung City Yaoti, and Kaohsiung City qualified for Division A after finishing in the top 3 places in the qualification tournament.

Date	Group	Team 1	Result	Team 2
January 1, 2009	A	Taipei County Hanchuang	6-1	Kaohsiung City
January 1, 2009	B	Yilan County	0-2	Kaohsiung City Yaoti
January 2, 2009	A	Kaohsiung City	6-1	Miaoli County
January 2, 2009	B	Kaohsiung City Yaoti	6-1	Tainan City
January 3, 2009	A	Miaoli County	0-7	Taipei County Hanchuang
January 3, 2009	B	Tainan City	0-2	Yilan County
January 4, 2009		Kaohsiung City (A2)	3-2	Yilan County (B2)

== Division A ==
=== Table ===
Pos	Team	Pld	W	D	L	GF	GA	GD	Pts	Qualification or relegation
1	Kaohsiung City Yoedy	15	11	1	3	44	14	+30	34	
2	Kaohsiung Taipower FC	15	11	1	3	34	12	+22	34	
3	Tainan County FC	15	7	4	4	23	15	+8	25	
4	Taipei City Tatung FC	15	6	2	7	32	25	+7	20	
5	Taipei County Hanchuang FC	15	4	2	9	25	36	−11	14	Qualification to relegation/promotion playoffs
6	Kaohsiung City FC	15	1	0	14	8	64	−56	3	Relegation to Division B

Source: rsssf.com

=== Results ===
Round 1
No.	Team 1	Result	Team 2
1	Taipei County Hanchuang	0-1	Kaohsiung Taipower
2	Kaohsiung City	0-5	Taipei City Tatung
3	Kaohsiung City Yaoti	(Jul 9)	Tainan County
4	Taipei County Hanchuang	0-0	Kaohsiung City Yaoti
5	Kaohsiung Taipower	1-0	Taipei City Tatung
6	Kaohsiung City	3-2	Tainan County
7	Tainan County	1-1	Taipei City Tatung
8	Kaohsiung City	0-1	Taipei County Hanchuang
9	Kaohsiung City Yaoti	1-0	Kaohsiung Taipower
10	Kaohsiung City	(Jul 11)	Kaohsiung City Yaoti
11	Tainan County	(Jul 11)	Kaohsiung Taipower
12	Taipei County Hanchuang	(Jul 11)	Taipei City Tatung
13	Kaohsiung City	1-3	Kaohsiung Taipower
14	Taipei County Hanchuang	0-1	Tainan County
15	Kaohsiung City Yaoti	2-1	Taipei City Tatung

Round 2
No.	Team 1	Result	Team 2
16	Taipei County Hanchuang	1-2	Kaohsiung Taipower
17	Kaohsiung City	(Jul 5)	Taipei City Tatung
18	Tainan County	2-4	Kaohsiung City Yaoti
19	Kaohsiung City Yaoti	(Aug 1)	Taipei County Hanchuang
20	Taipei City Tatung	1-5	Kaohsiung Taipower
21	Kaohsiung City	(Aug 1)	Tainan County
22	Tainan County	0-0	Taipei City Tatung
23	Taipei County Hanchuang	(Aug 8)	Kaohsiung City
24	Kaohsiung City Yaoti	0-1	Kaohsiung Taipower
25	Kaohsiung City Yaoti	5-1	Kaohsiung City
26	Tainan County	0-0	Kaohsiung Taipower
27	Taipei County Hanchuang	0-7	Taipei City Tatung
28	Kaohsiung City	(Sep 19)	Kaohsiung Taipower
29	Tainan County	(Sep 19)	Taipei County Hanchuang
30	Kaohsiung City Yaoti	(Sep 19)	Taipei City Tatung

Round 3
No.	Team 1	Result	Team 2
31	Kaohsiung City	(Sep 26)	Taipei County Hanchuang
32	Taipei City Tatung	(Sep 26)	Kaohsiung Taipower
33	Kaohsiung City Yaoti	(Sep 26)	Tainan County
34	Kaohsiung City Yaoti	(Oct 10)	Kaohsiung Taipower
35	Kaohsiung City	(Oct 10)	Taipei City Tatung
36	Tainan County	(Oct 10)	Taipei County Hanchuang
37	Tainan County	(Oct 14)	Kaohsiung City
38	Taipei County Hanchuang	(Oct 14)	Kaohsiung Taipower
39	Kaohsiung City Yaoti	(Oct 14)	Taipei City Tatung
40	Taipei County Hanchuang	(Nov 21)	Kaohsiung City Yaoti
41	Tainan County	(Nov 21)	Taipei City Tatung
42	Kaohsiung City	(Nov 21)	Kaohsiung Taipower
43	Taipei County Hanchuang	4-1	Taipei City Tatung
44	Tainan County	0-2	Kaohsiung Taipower
45	Kaohsiung City	0-9	Kaohsiung City Yaoti

=== Venues ===
Team	Venue
Kaohsiung City	Chung Cheng Industrial Vocational High School 1,000 capacity
Kaohsiung Taipower	Kaohsiung County Stadium, 18,000 capacity
Kaohsiung City Yaoti	Taichung Football Field 2,000 capacity
Tainan County	National Pei Men Senior High School, 1,000 capacity
Taipei County Hanchuang	Hsinchuang Stadium Taipei County, 1,000 capacity
Taipei City Tatung	Taipei Municipal Stadium, 16,000 capacity

== Division B ==
=== Teams ===
Miaoli County FC
Taipei County Stars FC (北縣明星)
Taipei County Stars consists of players from Taipei Football Club, No Limit Soccer Team, and expatriates. The head coach is David Camhi. The team is sponsored by the Master Football Academy (明星足球訓練館).
Taipei County Sanchung FC (北縣三重)
Taipei County Sanchung football team consists of students and graduates of National San Chung Senior High School. Most of them are still high-school students, therefore they have the lowest average age among all participating teams.
Taitung County Kuoyuan FC (東縣國源)
Yilan County FC
Yilan County football team consists of students and graduates of National Yilan Senior High School. They are considered the strongest team in the Division B. Notable players include Lo Chih-an and Lo Chih-en.

=== Table ===
Pos	Team	Pld	W	D	L	GF	GA	GD	Pts	Promotion or qualification
1	Yilan County	8	6	2	0	51	4	+47	20	Promotion to Division A
2	Taipei County Stars	8	5	3	0	24	7	+17	18	Qualification to relegation/promotion playoffs
3	Taipei County Sanchung	8	4	1	3	19	14	+5	13	
4	Tatung County Kuoyuan	8	2	0	6	19	39	−20	6	
5	Miaoli County	8	0	0	8	6	55	−49	0	

Source: Chinese Taipei Football Association

=== Results ===
Round 1
No.	Team 1	Result	Team 2
1	Taipei County Sanchung	0-5	Yilan County
2	Taipei County Stars	4-1	Miaoli County
3	Yilan County	8-1	Tatung County Kuoyuan
4	Taipei County Sanchung	1-1	Taipei County Stars
5	Tatung County Kuoyuan	8-2	Miaoli County
6	Yilan County	1-1	Taipei County Stars
7	Miaoli County	0-1	Taipei County Sanchung
8	Tatung County Kuoyuan	2-8	Taipei County Stars
9	Tatung County Kuoyuan	2-6	Taipei County Sanchung
10	Miaoli County	0-11	Yilan County

Round 2
No.	Team 1	Result	Team 2
11	Taipei County Sanchung	1-3	Yilan County
12	Miaoli County	1-7	Taipei County Stars
13	Taipei County Sanchung	0-1	Taipei County Stars
14	Yilan County	8-0	Tatung County Kuoyuan
15	Tatung County Kuoyuan	4-2	Miaoli County
16	Yilan County	1-1	Taipei County Stars
17	Taipei County Stars	1-0	Tatung County Kuoyuan
18	Miaoli County	0-6	Taipei County Sanchung
19	Tatung County Kuoyuan	2-4	Taipei County Sanchung
20	Yilan County	14-0	Miaoli County

Source: Chinese Taipei Football Association

== Relegation/Promotion playoffs ==
Date	Team 1	Result	Team 2
December 19, 2009	Taipei County Hanchuang	6-0	Taipei County Stars
December 20, 2009	Taipei County Stars	0-19	Taipei County Hanchuang

Taipei County Hanchuang won the playoff 25–0 in aggregate and remained in Division A.
