= Wang Chih-sheng =

Taiwanese footballer

Personal information
- Full name: Wang Chih-sheng (王志聖)
- Place of birth: Taiwan
- Position: Defender

Team information
- Current team: NSTC
- Number: 84

Senior career*
Years	Team	Apps	(Gls)
2007–2008	NSTC	2	(0)
2008–	Tatung		

International career
?–present	Taiwan futsal	?	(1)
- * Club domestic league appearances and goals as of April 15, 2007

Wang Chih-sheng (Chinese: 王志聖; pinyin: Wáng Zhìshèng) is a Taiwanese football player. He currently plays for Tatung F.C. He also plays futsal and represent Taiwan national futsal team in several international competitions.
