= National Taiwan Sport University (2008) =

Former university merger in Taiwan

- 國立臺灣體育大學
- Type: Public
- Active: 2008–2009
- Location: Taoyuan, Taichung and Chiayi County, Taiwan

The National Taiwan Sport University (NTSU; Chinese: 國立臺灣體育大學) once a public university located in Taoyuan, Taichung and Chiayi County, Taiwan. It was created in 2008 through the merger of National College of Physical Education and Sports and National Taiwan College of Physical Education.

NTSU was the first case that Taiwan merged universities failed, but its English name and Chinese abbreviation still in use nowadays.

== History ==
- February 1, 2008: National College of Physical Education and Sports and National Taiwan College of Physical Education merging, all colleges and administrative unit remain the same, expected integrate with 4 years.
- March 2009: Ministry of Education (MOE) confirmed that NTUS sent the unmerge request, the school will split into two college later this year.
- August 2009: National College of Physical Education and Sports rename to National Taiwan Sport University in English, the same before unmerge, but Chinese name does not have Taiwan（Chinese: 國立體育大學）.
- December 2012: National Taiwan College of Physical Education rename to National Taiwan University of Physical Education (NTUPE), and use the Chinese abbreviation of NTSU（Chinese: 臺灣體大）.

== Campuses ==
NTSU has three campuses:

- Taoyuan Campus in Guishan, Taoyuan
- Taichung Campus in North District, Taichung
- Chiayi Campus in Puzi, Chiayi County

=== In preparations ===
- Kaohsiung Campus in Zuoying District, Kaohsiung

== Relevant articles ==
- National Taiwan Sport University
- National Taiwan University of Sport
