= Lee Tai-lin =

Taiwanese footballer

Personal information
- Full name: Lee Tai-lin (李泰麟)
- Date of birth: 28 February 1985 (age 41)
- Place of birth: Republic of China
- Position: Defender

Team information
- Current team: NSTC

Senior career*
Years	Team	Apps	(Gls)
?–2007	Taipower		
2008	NSTC		
2009–present	Taipower		

International career^{‡}
2008–present	Chinese Taipei	2	(0)
- * Club domestic league appearances and goals as of April 13, 2008 ‡ National team caps and goals as of April 13, 2008

Lee Tai-lin (Chinese: 李泰麟; pinyin: Lǐ Tàilín; born 28 February 1985) is a Taiwanese football (soccer) player. He has played for Taiwan Power Company F.C. He is now serving military service and playing for National Sports Training Center football team.

== International goals ==
No.	Date	Venue	Opponent	Score	Result	Competition
1.	2 March 2013	Thuwunna Stadium, Yangon, Myanmar	India	1–1	1–2	2014 AFC Challenge Cup qualification
