= Tsai Chih-chieh =

Taiwanese footballer and futsal player

Personal information
- Full name: Tsai Chih-chieh (蔡志傑)
- Date of birth: 2 July 1982 (age 44)
- Place of birth: Republic of China (Taiwan)
- Position: Midfielder

Team information
- Current team: NSTC
- Number: 7

Senior career*
Years	Team	Apps	(Gls)
2007–	NSTC	0	(0)

International career
2007–present	Chinese Taipei futsal		
- * Club domestic league appearances and goals as of April 15, 2007

Tsai Chih-chieh (Chinese: 蔡志傑) is a Taiwanese football player. He currently serves in Taiwanese military service and plays for the Taiwan National Sports Training Center football team.

He played for the Chinese Taipei national futsal team at the 2004 FIFA Futsal World Championship finals.
