= Chen Po-liang =

Taiwanese footballer

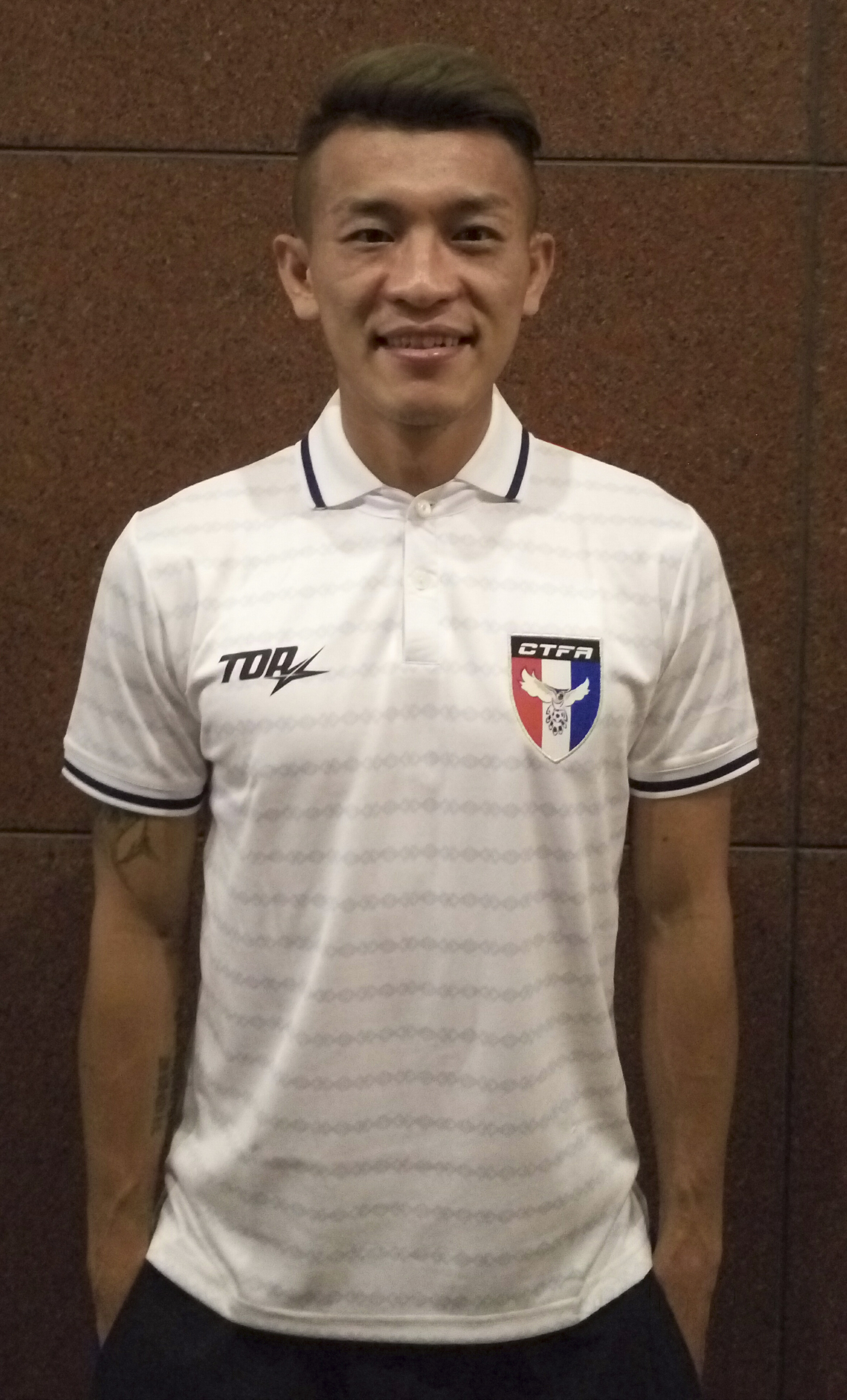
- Chen Po-liang in 2016

Personal information
- Date of birth: 11 August 1988 (age 38)
- Place of birth: Kaohsiung, Taiwan
- Height: 1.80 m (5 ft 11 in)
- Position: Midfielder

Team information
- Current team: Jiangxi Dingnan United
- Number: 17

Youth career
- 2003–2006: Chung Cheng

Senior career*
Years	Team	Apps	(Gls)
2006–2010	Taiwan PE College		
2010	Taipower	0	(0)
2011	Pegasus	7	(3)
2011	Taipower	8	(10)
2012–2013	Shenzhen Ruby	53	(9)
2014	Shanghai Shenhua	13	(0)
2015–2019	Zhejiang Greentown	132	(11)
2020–2021	Changchun Yatai	20	(2)
2022–2025	Qingdao West Coast	86	(6)
2026–	Jiangxi Dingnan United	14	(0)

International career^{‡}
2007	Chinese Taipei U-23	2	(0)
2006–	Chinese Taipei	99	(25)
- * Club domestic league appearances and goals ‡ National team caps and goals as of 13 November 2026

Chen Po-liang (Chinese: 陳柏良; pinyin: Chén Bóliáng; born 11 August 1988) is a Taiwanese professional footballer who plays as a midfielder for Jiangxi Dingnan United. He is also captain of the Chinese Taipei national team and their top scorer and made most appearances.

== Club career ==
=== Early career ===
Chen started to display his goal scoring sense since young age. He was the top goalscorer in the National Futsal Championship, in which he scored 28 goals for Minzu Junior High School of Kaohsiung, in 2003. In 2006, he won the Golden Boot in Highschool Football League when he played for Chung Cheng Industrial Vocational High School. His talent has been recognized by Taiwan PE College professor Chao Jung-jui, who later encouraged him to take several tryouts in Japan, with teams such as Chukyo University, Yokohama F. Marinos, F.C. Gifu, and F.C. Kariya.

In August 2010, Taiwanese Football Association banned Chen's qualification in the 2010 Intercity Football League season due to his transfer to Taipower

=== TSW Pegasus ===
He joined Hong Kong football club TSW Pegasus FC on 21 January 2011. He helped the club to finish third in the 2010-11 Hong Kong First Division League season. He score a total of 3 goals for the club in the half season. He left the club for home in June 2011 to play for Taipower.

=== Taipower ===
At Taipower, he helped the club win the 2011 AFC President's Cup. He scored 1 goal and made 1 assist in the final. It was the first ever Asian title for any Taiwan football clubs. Chen Po-Liang was voted the Most Valuable Player of the tournament.

=== Shenzhen Ruby ===
On 2 December 2011, it was announced Chen would join Beijing Baxy reputedly on a RMB 25,000 monthly salary. However, Chen moved to another China League One club Shenzhen Ruby in February 2012.

=== Shanghai Greenland ===
In December 2013, Chinese Super League side Shanghai Greenland Shenhua official announced that they had signed Chen Po-liang from Shenzhen Ruby.

=== Hangzhou Greentown ===
On 11 February 2015, Chen transferred to fellow Chinese Super League side Hangzhou Greentown.

=== Changchun Yatai ===
On March 12, 2020, Changchun Yatai announced that they had signed Chen.

=== Qingdao West Coast ===
In April 2022, Chen joined China League One club Qingdao West Coast as free agent. After the 2025 season, the club announced Chen's departure.

=== Jiangxi Dingnan United ===
On 10 February 2026, Chen joined China League One club Jiangxi Dingnan United.

== International career ==
Chen speaks about his international career for CNS.

Chen was appointed captain of the national team in August 2009. He is the youngest captain in the national team history. On 25 August 2009, in an East Asian Football Championship 2010 semi final game, he scored two goals against Guam to help Chinese Taipei secure a 4-2 win.

In the 2014 FIFA World Cup Asian qualification first round matches, on 29 June 2011, Chen Po-Liang scored a goal in the 2-1 loss away to Malaysia. Back to Taipei on 3 July 2011 for the return leg, Chen Po-Liang scored a penalty but missed a second as Chinese Taipei won 3-2 at home but lost the tie on the away goals rule. Chen was so upset with the penalty miss that he cried uncontrollably and apologized to the 15,000 fans who attended the game at the Taipei Municipal Stadium.

== Career statistics ==
=== Club statistics ===
Appearances and goals by club, season and competition
Club	Season	League			National Cup		League Cup		Continental		Other		Total	
Club	Season	Division	Apps	Goals	Apps	Goals	Apps	Goals	Apps	Goals	Apps	Goals	Apps	Goals
Pegasus	2010–11	HK First Division	7	3	2	0	1	0	6	0	0 (Note: Appearances in Hong Kong Senior Challenge Shield)	0	16	3
Taipower	2011	Intercity Football League	8	10	?	?	—		3	3	—		11	13
Shenzhen Ruby	2012	China League One	25	5	0	0	—		—		—		25	5
Shenzhen Ruby	2013	China League One	28	4	2	0	—		—		—		30	4
Shenzhen Ruby	Total		53	9	2	0	0	0	0	0	0	0	55	9
Shanghai Shenhua	2014	Chinese Super League	13	0	1	0	—		—		—		14	0
Zhejiang Greentown	2015	Chinese Super League	25	1	0	0	—		—		—		25	1
Zhejiang Greentown	2016	Chinese Super League	25	1	1	1	—		—		—		26	2
Zhejiang Greentown	2017	China League One	26	4	1	0	—		—		—		27	4
Zhejiang Greentown	2018	China League One	30	4	0	0	—		—		—		30	4
Zhejiang Greentown	2019	China League One	26	1	0	0	—		—		—		26	1
Zhejiang Greentown	Total		132	11	2	1	0	0	0	0	0	0	134	12
Changchun Yatai	2020	China League One	13	2	2	0	—		—		—		15	2
Changchun Yatai	2021	Chinese Super League	7	0	2	0	—		—		—		9	0
Changchun Yatai	Total		20	2	4	0	0	0	0	0	0	0	24	2
Qingdao West Coast	2022	China League One	32	4	0	0	—		—		—		32	4
Qingdao West Coast	2023	China League One	25	2	0	0	—		—		—		25	2
Qingdao West Coast	2024	Chinese Super League	17	0	1	0	—		—		—		18	0
Qingdao West Coast	2025	Chinese Super League	12	0	1	0	—		—		—		13	0
Qingdao West Coast	Total		86	6	2	0	0	0	0	0	0	0	88	6
Dingnan Ganliang	2026	China League One	14	0									14	0
Career total			303	41	13	1	1	0	9	3	0	0	326	45

=== International goals ===
Scores and results list Chinese Taipei's goal tally first.

List of international goals scored by Chen Po-liang
No.	Date	Venue	Opponent	Score	Result	Competition
1.	17 June 2007	Estadio Campo Desportivo, Taipa, Macau	Guam	6–0	10–0	2008 East Asian Football Championship
2.	17 June 2007	Estadio Campo Desportivo, Taipa, Macau	Guam	7–0	10–0	2008 East Asian Football Championship
3.	24 June 2007	Estadio Campo Desportivo, Taipa, Macau	Macau	4–1	7–2	2008 East Asian Football Championship
4.	4 April 2008	Zhongshan Soccer Stadium, Taipei, Taiwan	Guam	3–1	4–1	2008 AFC Challenge Cup qualification
5.	27 May 2008	Jawaharlal Nehru Stadium, Chennai, India	India	1–0	2–2	Friendly
6.	8 April 2009	Sugathadasa Stadium, Colombo, Sri Lanka	Brunei	1–0	5–0	2010 AFC Challenge Cup qualification
7.	8 April 2009	Sugathadasa Stadium, Colombo, Sri Lanka	Brunei	2–0	5–0	2010 AFC Challenge Cup qualification
8.	8 April 2009	Sugathadasa Stadium, Colombo, Sri Lanka	Brunei	4–0	5–0	2010 AFC Challenge Cup qualification
9.	25 August 2009	Kaohsiung National Stadium, Kaohsiung, Taiwan	Guam	1–2	4–2	2010 East Asian Football Championship
10.	25 August 2009	Kaohsiung National Stadium, Kaohsiung, Taiwan	Guam	3–2	4–2	2010 East Asian Football Championship
11.	9 October 2010	Kaohsiung National Stadium, Kaohsiung, Taiwan	Macau	6–0	7–1	2010 Long Teng Cup
12.	10 February 2011	Kaohsiung National Stadium, Kaohsiung, Taiwan	Laos	3–0	5–2	2012 AFC Challenge Cup qualification
13.	16 February 2011	New Laos National Stadium, Vientiane, Laos	Laos	1–0	1–1	2012 AFC Challenge Cup qualification
14.	29 June 2011	Bukit Jalil National Stadium, Kuala Lumpur, Malaysia	Malaysia	1–2	1–2	2014 FIFA World Cup qualification
15.	3 July 2011	Taipei Municipal Stadium, Taipei, Taiwan	Malaysia	2–2	3–2	2014 FIFA World Cup qualification
16.	30 September 2011	Kaohsiung National Stadium, Kaohsiung, Taiwan	Macau	2–0	3–0	2011 Long Teng Cup
17.	2 June 2016	Kaohsiung National Stadium, Kaohsiung, Taiwan	Cambodia	2–1	2–2	2019 AFC Asian Cup qualification
18.	9 November 2016	Mong Kok Stadium, Mong Kok, Hong Kong	Hong Kong	1–2	2–4	2017 EAFF E-1 Football Championship
19.	26 March 2017	Taipei Municipal Stadium, Taipei, Taiwan	Turkmenistan	1–2	1–3	2019 AFC Asian Cup qualification
20.	5 October 2017	Taipei Municipal Stadium, Taipei, Taiwan	Mongolia	2–1	4–2	Friendly
21.	5 October 2017	Taipei Municipal Stadium, Taipei, Taiwan	Mongolia	3–1	4–2	Friendly
22.	10 October 2017	Taipei Municipal Stadium, Taipei, Taiwan	Bahrain	1–1	2–1	2019 AFC Asian Cup qualification
23.	14 November 2017	Sport toplumy, Balkanabat, Turkmenistan	Turkmenistan	1–2	1–2	2019 AFC Asian Cup qualification
24.	4 December 2017	Taipei Municipal Stadium, Taipei, Taiwan	Timor-Leste	3–1	3–1	2017 CTFA International Tournament
25.	27 March 2018	Taipei Municipal Stadium, Taipei, Taiwan	Singapore	1–0	1–0	2019 AFC Asian Cup qualification

== Honors ==
Taipower

- Intercity Football League: 2011
- AFC President's Cup: 2011

Changchun Yatai

- China League One: 2020

Individual

- 2008 Intercity Football League Golden Boot and Golden Ball
- 2010 Intercity Football League Golden Boot
- 2011 AFC President's Cup Most Valuable Player
