= Hsu Jen-feng =

Taiwanese footballer

Personal information
- Full name: Hsu Jen-feng (許人丰)
- Date of birth: 28 April 1979 (age 47)
- Place of birth: Republic of China (Taiwan)
- Height: 1.78 m (5 ft 10 in)
- Position: Goalkeeper

Team information
- Current team: Tatung
- Number: 77

Senior career*
Years	Team	Apps	(Gls)
2005–2007	NSTC		(0)
2007–2017	Tatung	3	(0)
2021-2022	Inter Taoyuan	2	(0)

International career
2006–2008	Chinese Taipei	7	(0)
2006–	Chinese Taipei futsal		
- * Club domestic league appearances and goals as of August 02, 2025

Hsu Jen-feng (Chinese: 許人丰; born 28 April 1979) is a retired Taiwanese football goalkeeper. He last played for Inter Taoyuan in the Taiwanese Second Division. He has played for the Chinese Taipei national football team and the Chinese Taipei national futsal team.

In the Intercity Football League 2007 season, he helped Tatung F.C. to win the championship, and he personally won the Best Goalkeeper Award.
