= Chan Che-yuan =

Taiwanese footballer

Chan Che-yuan 詹哲淵
Personal information
- Date of birth: 23 October 1989 (age 37)
- Place of birth: Kaohsiung, Taiwan
- Height: 1.74 m (5 ft 8 1/2 in)
- Position: Attacking midfielder

Team information
- Current team: NSTC
- Number: 21

Senior career*
Years	Team	Apps	(Gls)
2009	Kaohsiung Yaoti		
2010–	NSTC		

International career^{‡}
2010–	Chinese Taipei	25	(0)
- * Club domestic league appearances and goals as of 15 August 2014 ‡ National team caps and goals as of 15 August 2014

Chan Che-yuan (Chinese: 詹哲淵; pinyin: Zhān Zhéyuān; born 23 October 1989) is a Taiwanese footballer who currently plays for the National Sports Training Center football team in Taiwan as an attacking midfielder.

== International career ==
Chan played his first international game with the senior national team on 16 January 2010 against the Philippines (0–0), where he was part of the starting squad and played the entire match.
