= Jong Chien-wu =

Taiwanese football manager

Jong Chien-wu (Chinese: 鍾劍武) is a Taiwanese football (soccer) manager. He has managed Lukuang football team, Chinese Taipei national futsal team, etc. He is now Chinese Taipei Football Association's deputy general secretary.

== Managerial history ==
- 1984 - Taipei Jingwen High School football team
- 1991 - Lukuang football team
- 2002 - Chinese Taipei national futsal team
