= Ho Ming-tsan =

Taiwanese footballer

Personal information
- Full name: Ho Ming-tsan (何明站)
- Date of birth: 12 May 1983 (age 43)
- Place of birth: Alian, Kaohsiung, Taiwan
- Position: Striker

Youth career
- Fu Jen Catholic University

Senior career*
Years	Team	Apps	(Gls)
?–2007	Taipower		
2009–present	Taipower		

International career
2005–2013	Chinese Taipei	11	(3)
- * Club domestic league appearances and goals

Ho Ming-tsan (Chinese: 何明站; pinyin: Hé Míngzhàn, born 12 May 1983 in Alian, Kaohsiung) is a Taiwanese professional footballer who has played for Taiwan Power Company F.C. and Chinese Taipei national football team as second striker or midfielder.

== International career ==
=== International goals ===
Scores and results list Chinese Taipei's goal tally first.

No	Date	Venue	Opponent	Score	Result	Competition
1.	5 March 2005	Zhongshan Soccer Stadium, Taipei, Taiwan	Guam	5–0	9–0	2005 East Asian Football Championship qualification
2.	5 March 2005	Zhongshan Soccer Stadium, Taipei, Taiwan	Guam	8–0	9–0	2005 East Asian Football Championship qualification
3.	5 March 2005	Zhongshan Soccer Stadium, Taipei, Taiwan	Guam	9–0	9–0	2005 East Asian Football Championship qualification

== Honors ==
- National First Division Football League 2005 Top Scorer
- 2011 AFC President's Cup Top Scorer
