= Chuang Wei-lun =

Taiwanese footballer (born 1982)

Personal information
- Full name: Chuang Wei-lun (莊偉倫)
- Date of birth: 17 March 1982 (age 44)
- Place of birth: Republic of China
- Height: 1.74 m (5 ft 8 1/2 in)
- Positions: Striker; midfielder

Team information
- Current team: 63

Senior career*
Years	Team	Apps	(Gls)
2003–2005	Tatung	?	(4)
2005–2007	Taiwan NSTC	4	(1)
2007–	Tatung	3	(4)

International career
2003	Chinese Taipei U-23	2	(0)
2006–present	Chinese Taipei	7	(2)
- * Club domestic league appearances and goals as of April 15, 2007

Chuang Wei-lun (Chinese: 莊偉倫; pinyin: Zhuāng Wěilún; born 17 March 1982) is a Taiwanese football player who currently plays for Tatung F.C. and the Chinese Taipei national football team. He is fit either as a striker or as a midfielder. When he played for Tatung F.C., he was voted the best right winger in the Chinese Taipei National Football League 2005 season.

On February 9, 2007, Grulla Morioka of Japanese Tohoku League announced Chuang's transfer in their official site. He became the second Taiwanese male player to join a Japanese professional football club, following goalkeeper Lu Kun-chi. Grulla Morioka had a formal press conference for them on March 4, 2007, in which Chuang expressed his desire to help the team for promotion. However, on March 13, the official site of Grulla Morioka reported that Chuang returned to Taiwan before contracting with the club due to family affair.

Afterward, Chuang returned to Tatung.

== International goals ==
No.	Date	Venue	Opponent	Score	Result	Competition
1.	1 April 2006	MA Aziz Stadium, Chittagong, Bangladesh	Philippines	1–0	1–0	2006 AFC Challenge Cup
2.	3 April 2006	MA Aziz Stadium, Chittagong, Bangladesh	Afghanistan	1–2	2–2	2006 AFC Challenge Cup
