= Tai Hung-hsu =

Taiwanese footballer

Personal information
- Full name: Tai Hung-hsu (戴宏旭)
- Date of birth: October 4, 1987 (age 39)
- Place of birth: Taiwan
- Height: 1.82 m (5 ft 11 1/2 in)
- Position: Striker

Team information
- Current team: San Chung
- Number: 8

Youth career
- 2003–2006: San Chung

International career
Years	Team	Apps	(Gls)
2006	Chinese Taipei U-23		
2006–present	Chinese Taipei		

Tai Hung-hsu (Chinese: 戴宏旭, born October 4, 1987) is a Taiwanese football striker. He was voted as the best youth player in the 2005 season of Taiwan National Football League.

In July, 2006, Tai, at the age of 19, was reported to join Chinese side Xiamen Lanshi along with another Taiwanese youngster, Chen Po-liang. It ended up with disappointment as CTFA handed in the name list in September whereas the summer transfer window of China Super League has already ended in July.

In December, Tai was banned by CTFA Discipline Committee for refusing the call-up of 2007 AFC Asian Cup qualification against Iran in October. As a result, he was not allowed to attend any local or international football competitions for two years. Tai returned to the national team in August 2009. He was called up by then Head Coach Lo Chih-tsung and joined the 2010 East Asian Football Championship.

== Playing history ==
- National San Chung Senior High School football team
- Ming Chuan University football team
- Taiwan national Olympic football team (as "China Steel" in Fubon Enterprise Football League 2006)
