= Chen Jeng-i =

Taiwanese footballer

Personal information
- Full name: Chen Jeng-i (陳正一)
- Date of birth: January 23, 1974 (age 52)
- Place of birth: Kaohsiung, Republic of China (Taiwan)
- Height: 1.68 m (5 ft 6 in)
- Position: Defender

Team information
- Current team: Tatung
- Number: 55

Senior career*
Years	Team	Apps	(Gls)
- Lukuang
- Tatung

International career
- Chinese Taipei
- * Club domestic league appearances and goals

Chen Jeng-i (Chinese: 陳正一, born January 23, 1974) is a Taiwanese football player who currently plays for Tatung F.C. as a defender. He can play both right back and left back and was voted as one of the best defenders in 2005 league season. Chen Jeng-i played his last match in 2007. He appears to have retired.

== Playing history ==
- Feng Lin Primary School (鳳林國小)
- Feng Lin Junior High School (鳳林國中)
- Chung Cheng Industrial Vocational High School
- Taipei Physical Education College
- Lukuang football team
- Tatung F.C.
