= Kao Hao-chieh =

Taiwanese footballer (born 1980)

Personal information
- Full name: Kao Hao-chieh (高豪傑)
- Date of birth: 24 July 1980 (age 46)
- Place of birth: Republic of China (Taiwan)
- Height: 1.87 m (6 ft 1 1/2 in)
- Position: Defender

Team information
- Current team: Tatung
- Number: 60

Senior career*
Years	Team	Apps	(Gls)
2000–2003	Tatung	?	
2004–2005	NSTC	?	
2006–present	Tatung	4+?	(0)

International career
2004–present	Chinese Taipei	12	(0)
- * Club domestic league appearances and goals

Kao Hao-chieh (Chinese: 高豪傑; pinyin: Gāo Háojié; born 24 July 1980) is a Taiwanese football player who currently plays for Tatung F.C. as a defender.

Kao represented Chinese Taipei in 2006 FIFA World Cup qualification (2004) and East Asian Cup 2005 and became regular squad in 2007 AFC Asian Cup qualification (2006).
