= Yang Cheng-hsing =

Taiwanese footballer

Personal information
- Full name: Yang Cheng-hsing (楊振興)
- Date of birth: 19 August 1973 (age 53)
- Place of birth: Republic of China
- Position: Goalkeeper

Senior career*
Years	Team	Apps	(Gls)
- Taipower

International career
1997–2004	Chinese Taipei	?	(1)
- * Club domestic league appearances and goals

Yang Cheng-hsing (Chinese: 楊振興; pinyin: Yáng Zhènxīng; born 19 August 1973) is a former Taiwanese football player. He had been Chinese Taipei's first-choice goalkeeper for more than 10 years and sometimes been called the Taiwanese Chilavert. In his international career, he once scored a penalty, also his first goal for Chinese Taipei, in East Asian Cup 2003 qualifiers against Mongolia. It made him the first Taiwanese goalkeeper who had scored in international competitions. At club level, he had played for Taiwan Power Company F.C. He retired in 2004.

== International goals ==
No.	Date	Venue	Opponent	Score	Result	Competition
1	26 February 2003	Hong Kong Stadium, Hong Kong	Mongolia	4–0	4–0	2003 East Asian Football Championship
