= Chiang Ming-han =

Taiwanese footballer

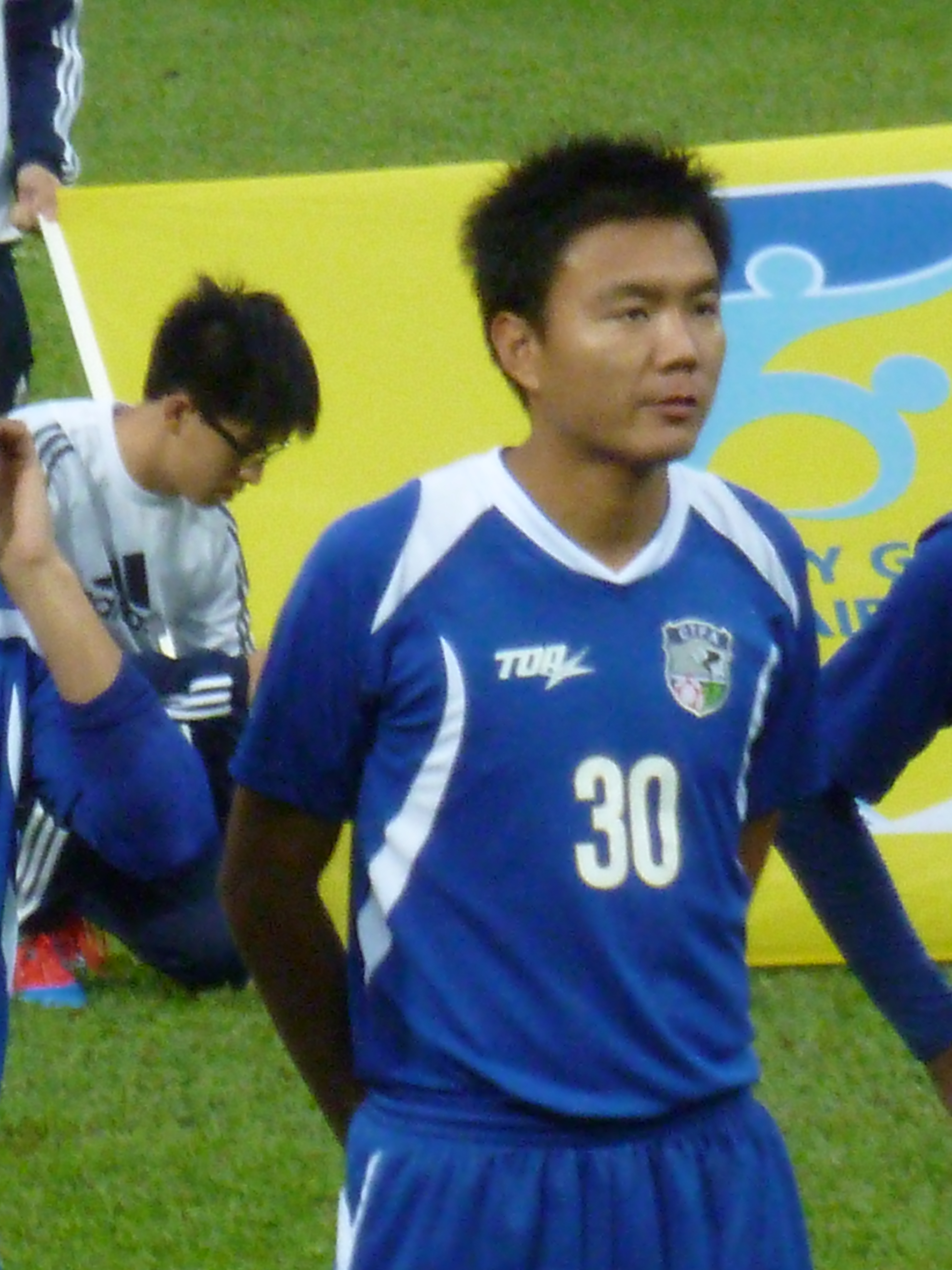
- Chiang Ming-han in 2012

Personal information
- Date of birth: 6 October 1986 (age 40)
- Place of birth: Taiwan
- Height: 1.78 m (5 ft 10 in)
- Position: Defender

Team information
- Current team: Taiwan Power Company

Senior career*
Years	Team	Apps	(Gls)
2013–	Taiwan Power Company		

International career^{‡}
2008–	Chinese Taipei	22	(0)
- * Club domestic league appearances and goals ‡ National team caps and goals as of 24 March 2016

Chiang Ming-han (Chinese: 蔣明翰; pinyin: Jiǎng Mínghàn; born 6 October 1986) is a Taiwanese footballer who currently plays as a defender for the national and club level.
