= Ju Wen-bin =

Taiwanese footballer and manager

Personal information
- Full name: Ju Wen-bin 朱文彬
- Date of birth: 5 July 1969 (age 57)
- Place of birth: Republic of China (Taiwan)
- Height: 1.77 m (5 ft 10 in)
- Position: Defender

Team information
- Current team: Tatung
- Number: 59

Senior career*
Years	Team	Apps	(Gls)
?–present	Tatung		

International career
1988–2003	Chinese Taipei		

Managerial career
- 1996–2001: Kuang Fu
- 2001–: Hualien PE
- 2004–2005: Chinese Taipei U-17
- * Club domestic league appearances and goals

Ju Wen-bin (Chinese: 朱文彬; pinyin: Zhū Wénbīn; born 5 July 1969) is a Taiwanese football player and manager.

== Career ==
As a player, Ju plays for Tatung F.C. as a defender and was voted as one of the best center backs at the 2005 league season. He was also the former skipper of Chinese Taipei national football team.

As a manager, Ju has managed Kuang Fu Junior High School of Hualien and Chinese Taipei women's national under-17 football team. He is the current head coach of women's football team of Hualien Physical Experimental Education Senior High School.
