= Tsai Hsien-tang =

Taiwanese footballer

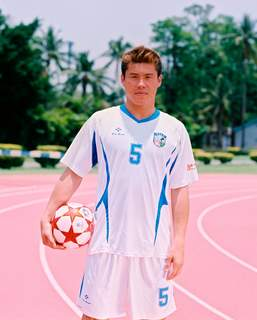

Personal information
- Full name: Tsai Hsien-tang (蔡憲棠)
- Date of birth: 29 April 1977 (age 49)
- Place of birth: Taipei, Taiwan
- Height: 1.86 m (6 ft 1 in)
- Positions: Defender; defensive midfielder

Team information
- Current team: Tainan City
- Number: 58

Senior career*
Years	Team	Apps	(Gls)
2000-2016	Tatung		
2017-2018	Tainan City		

International career
2000-2012	Chinese Taipei	43	(2)
- * Club domestic league appearances and goals

Tsai Hsien-tang (Chinese: 蔡憲棠; born 29 April 1977), formerly known as Tsai Hui-kai (Chinese: 蔡暉鎧), is a Taiwanese football (soccer) player. He played as a defender and a defensive midfielder.

== Career ==
During his participation in Tatung F.C., he was voted the best defensive midfielder after the Chinese Taipei National Football League 2005 season.

In October 2005, he suffered a serious knee ligament injury in training and was unable to represent Chinese Taipei at the 2005 East Asian Games held in Macau. The injury also made him unable to be in the starting lineup during the entire Enterprise Football League 2006 season.

In 2008, after he changed his name to Tsai Hsien-tang, he became captain of the Chinese Taipei national football team during the 2008 AFC Challenge Cup.

From 2008 to 2012, he played for the national team of Taiwan.

In 2017 he played for Tainan City. He retired in 2018.
