= Huang Wei-yi =

Taiwanese footballer (born 1985)

Personal information
- Full name: Huang Wei-yi (黃瑋儀)
- Date of birth: 11 September 1985 (age 41)
- Place of birth: Yilan, Republic of China (Taiwan)
- Height: 1.68 m (5 ft 6 in)
- Position: Striker

Team information
- Current team: Tatung
- Number: 71

Youth career
- 2000–2005: Yilan

Senior career*
Years	Team	Apps	(Gls)
2005–2009	Tatung	19	(13)
2009–present	NSTC		

International career
2003–present	Chinese Taipei	18	(8)
2005–2007	Chinese Taipei U-23	4	(0)
- * Club domestic league appearances and goals as of April 15, 2007

Huang Wei-yi (Chinese: 黃瑋儀, born 11 September 1985 in Yilan, Republic of China) is a Taiwanese footballer who plays as a striker for Tatung F.C. and the Taiwanese national team (known as "Chinese Taipei" for political reasons). He is a member of the Atayal tribe of indigenous Taiwanese peoples.

In 2000, Huang started playing for the Ilan Youth soccer team, where he appeared in 22 matches and scored 10 goals. On August 13, 2005, Huang was transferred to Tatung F.C. after his talents were noticed when playing for the Chinese Taipei National Football League.

In 2006 FIFA World Cup qualification games, he scored 3 goals, which were the only goals scored by Chinese Taipei.
