= Lee Meng-chian =

Taiwanese footballer

Personal information
- Full name: Lee Meng-chian
- Date of birth: 5 December 1981 (age 44)
- Place of birth: Chinese Taipei
- Height: 1.76 m (5 ft 9 in)
- Position: Defender

Senior career*
Years	Team	Apps	(Gls)
2005–2013	Taiwan Power Company		

International career^{‡}
2005–2014	Chinese Taipei	27	(1)
- * Club domestic league appearances and goals as of 24 March 2013 ‡ National team caps and goals as of 24 March 2013

Lee Meng-chian is a Taiwanese footballer who plays as a defender for Taiwan Power Company.

He has represented Chinese Taipei in FIFA competition. He appeared in 2007 AFC Asian Cup qualification, competing in matches against Iran and Syria, as well as the 2004 Olympic qualifiers, playing in the preliminary round against Singapore.

== International goals ==
No.	Date	Venue	Opponent	Score	Result	Competition
1.	4 March 2013	Thuwunna Stadium, Yangon, Myanmar	Myanmar	1–1	1–1	2014 AFC Challenge Cup qualification
