= Chen Yu-lin =

Taiwanese footballer

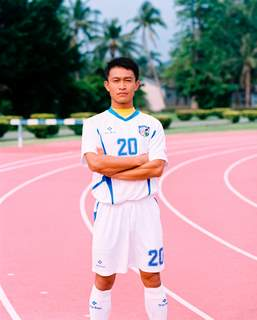

Personal information
- Date of birth: 21 October 1985 (age 41)
- Place of birth: Lioujia, Tainan, Taiwan
- Height: 1.67 m (5 ft 6 in)
- Position: Full back

Team information
- Current team: Taiwan Power Company F.C.

Senior career*
Years	Team	Apps	(Gls)
2006	China Steel F.C.		
2007–2010	Taiwan PE College		
2009	→ Kaohsiung City Yoedy (loan)		
2010–	Taiwan Power Company F.C.		

International career
2006–	Chinese Taipei	27	(0)
- * Club domestic league appearances and goals

Chen Yu-lin
- Chinese: 陳俞霖
Transcriptions
Standard Mandarin
- Hanyu Pinyin: Chén Yúlín
- Wade–Giles: Ch'en Yülin
- Tongyong Pinyin: Chén Yúlín

Chen Yu-lin (Chinese: 陳俞霖; pinyin: Chén Yúlín, born 21 October 1985 in Lioujia, Tainan) is a Taiwanese football player. Nicknamed Lioujia for his birthplace, some people consider Chen the best left back in Taiwan at present. He has represented Chinese Taipei in the 2007 AFC Asian Cup and the 2010 East Asian Football Championship.
