= National Taiwan University of Sport =

Public University in Taiwan

- 國立臺灣體育運動大學
- Motto: 術德兼修、堅強勤奮
- Motto in English: Pursuing expertise and integrity. Be strong and hardworking.
- Type: Public
- Established: 1961; 65 years ago
- Affiliations: National University System of Taiwan
- Principal: Kuang-Piao Hsu
- Students: 2,742 (2020 academic year)
- Location: Taichung, Taiwan
- Website: eng.ntus.edu.tw

National Taiwan University of Sport
- Traditional Chinese: 國立臺灣體育運動大學
- Simplified Chinese: 国立台湾体育运动大学
Transcriptions
Standard Mandarin
- Hanyu Pinyin: Guólì Táiwān Tǐyù Yùndòng Dàxué
- IPA: [kwǒ.lî.tʰǎɪ.wán.tʰì.ŷ.ŷn.tʊ̂ŋ.tâ.ɕɥě]

The National Taiwan University of Sport (NTUS; Chinese: 國立臺灣體育運動大學) is a public university specialized in sports in Taichung, Taiwan, and a member of the National University System of Taiwan.

NTUS was once merged with the National College of Physical Education and Sports, as National Taiwan Sport University, but it did not come to success, leading to the first failed merger of universities in Taiwan.

== History ==
=== Founding ===
National Taiwan University of Sport founded in June 1961 as the Taiwan Provincial Junior College of Physical Education, and was Taiwan's first three-year junior college that specialized in sport. In the beginning, it only had a Department of Sport. In the next ten years, the university added a night school as well as a campus in Hsinchu for five-year programs. Hsinchu Campus eventually closed in 1980.

In 1984, Taiwan Provincial College of Physical Education closed its night school. In the 1990s, the school changed its affiliation from the Taiwan Provincial Government to the Ministry of Education and was renamed as the National Taiwan Junior College of Physical Education.

=== Merging failed ===
In 1998, National Taiwan College of Physical Education opened a new campus in Puzi, and placed a library in the Chiayi County Stadium before the completion of their teaching complex building. Even though Chiayi Campus had two departments and a graduate school, it was still criticized for its low usage.

In 2004, the Taichung City Government entrusted the Taichung Municipal Stadium to the school.

National Taiwan College of Physical Education planned to request a name change to National Taiwan Sports University, but the National College of Physical Education and Sports in Guishan, Taoyuan also wanted the same name. Therefore, in 2008, the Ministry of Education pushed the merger of two schools, but the main campus, set in Taoyuan, lead to teachers and students of the former National Taiwan College of Physical Education unpleased, and eventually the merger failed in 2009.

=== Changed name ===
After merging failed with the National College of Physical Education and Sports, in November 2011, the Ministry of Education approved the school name change to National Taiwan University of Physical Education (NTUPE), while keeping the Chinese abbreviation of the National Taiwan Sports University (Chinese: 臺體、臺灣體大).

The school changed its English name to National Taiwan University of Sport in August 2014, and closed Chiayi Campus after a year.

== Academics ==
NTUS has three colleges:

| College of Sport Education | Department | Bachelor | Bachelor of Extension Education | Master | PhD |
|---|---|---|---|---|---|
| College of Sport Education | Dept. of Physical Education | ✔ | ✔ | ✔ | |
| College of Sport Education | Dept. of Dance | ✔ | | ✔ | |
| College of Sport Education | Dept. of Sport Performance | ✔ | | ✔ | ✔ |
| College of Sport Education | Dept. of Combat Sport | ✔ | | | |
| College of Sport Education | Dept. of Ball Sport | ✔ | | | |
| College of Sport Industry | Dept. of Recreational Sport | ✔ | | ✔ | |
| College of Sport Industry | Dept. of Sport Management | ✔ | | ✔ | ✔ |
| College of Sport Industry | Dept. of Exercise Health Science | ✔ | | ✔ | |
| College of Sport Industry | Dept. of Sport Information and Communication | ✔ | | | |

== Campuses ==
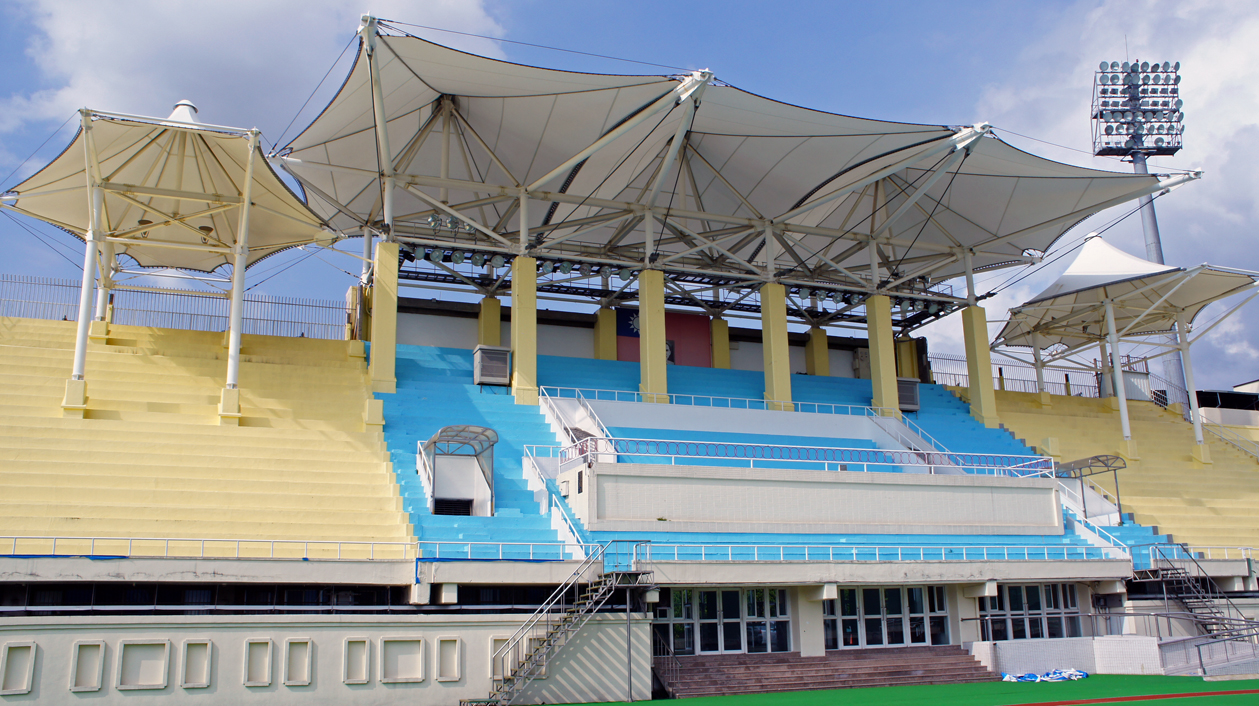
Taichung Municipal Stadium

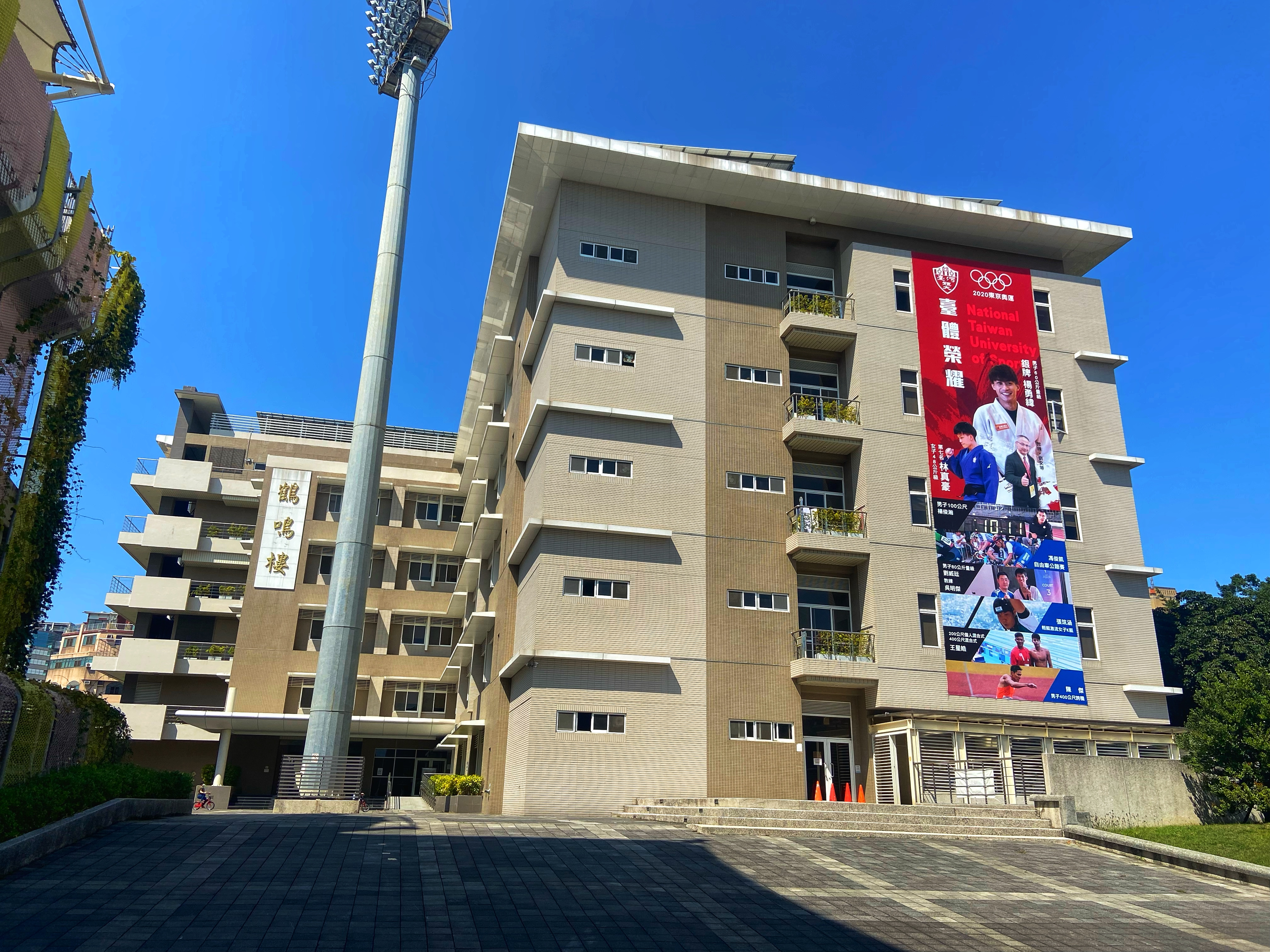
He-Ming Building

- Main Campus in North District, Taichung

=== Closed ===
- Hsinchu Campus in Hsinchu County (1970–1980)
- Chiayi Campus in Puzi, Chiayi County (1998–2015)

== Student life ==
=== Athletics ===
The NTUS football club has participated in domestic football leagues since 1983. In recent years, they use different team names due to league regulations.

- Enterprise Football League 2008: Molten Tso I (Molten佐儀)
- Intercity Football League 2008: Chia Cheng Hsin (家成興)
- Intercity Football League 2009: Kaohsiung Yoedy (高市耀迪)
- 2017 Taiwan Football Premier League: Hasus TSU F.C. (臺體光磊)
- 2018 Taiwan Football Premier League & 2019 Taiwan Football Premier League: NTUS (臺灣體大)
- 2020 Taiwan Football Premier League: Land Home NTUS (璉紅臺體)

The 500-capacity Taichung Taiyuan Football Pitch is used for home games.

== Notable people ==
=== Alumni ===
Notable NTUS alumni include:

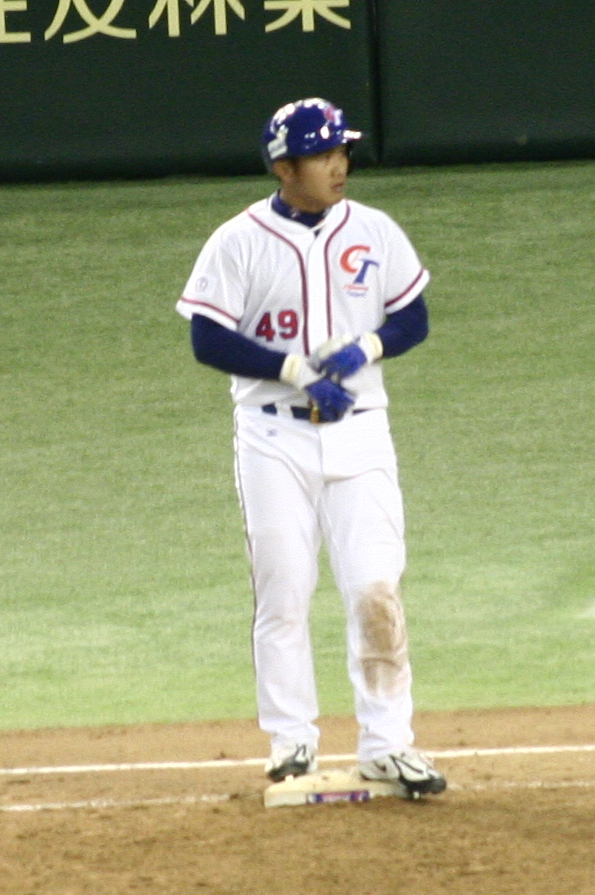
Chang Tai-shan, hitting coach of Wei Chuan Dragons

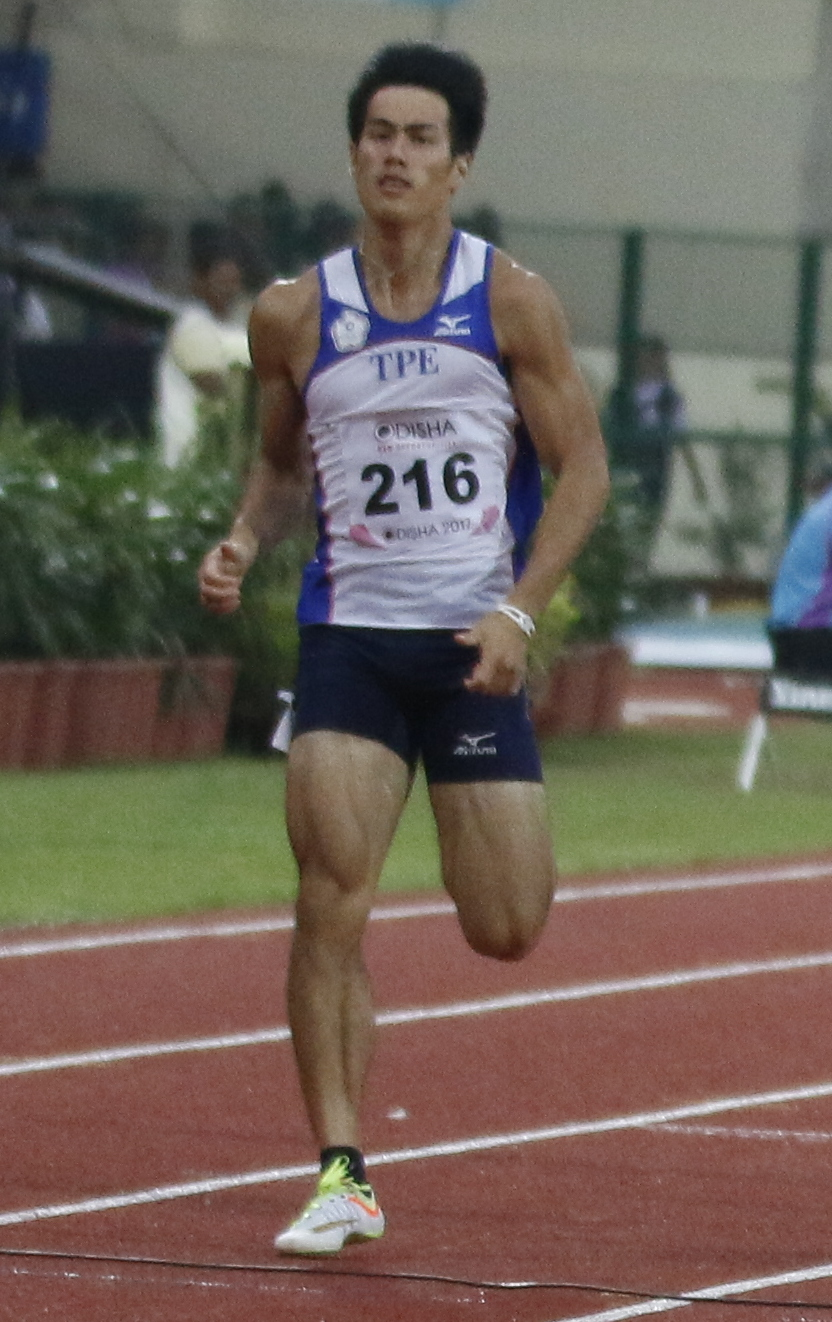
Yang Chun-han, gold medalist of 2017 Summer Universiade

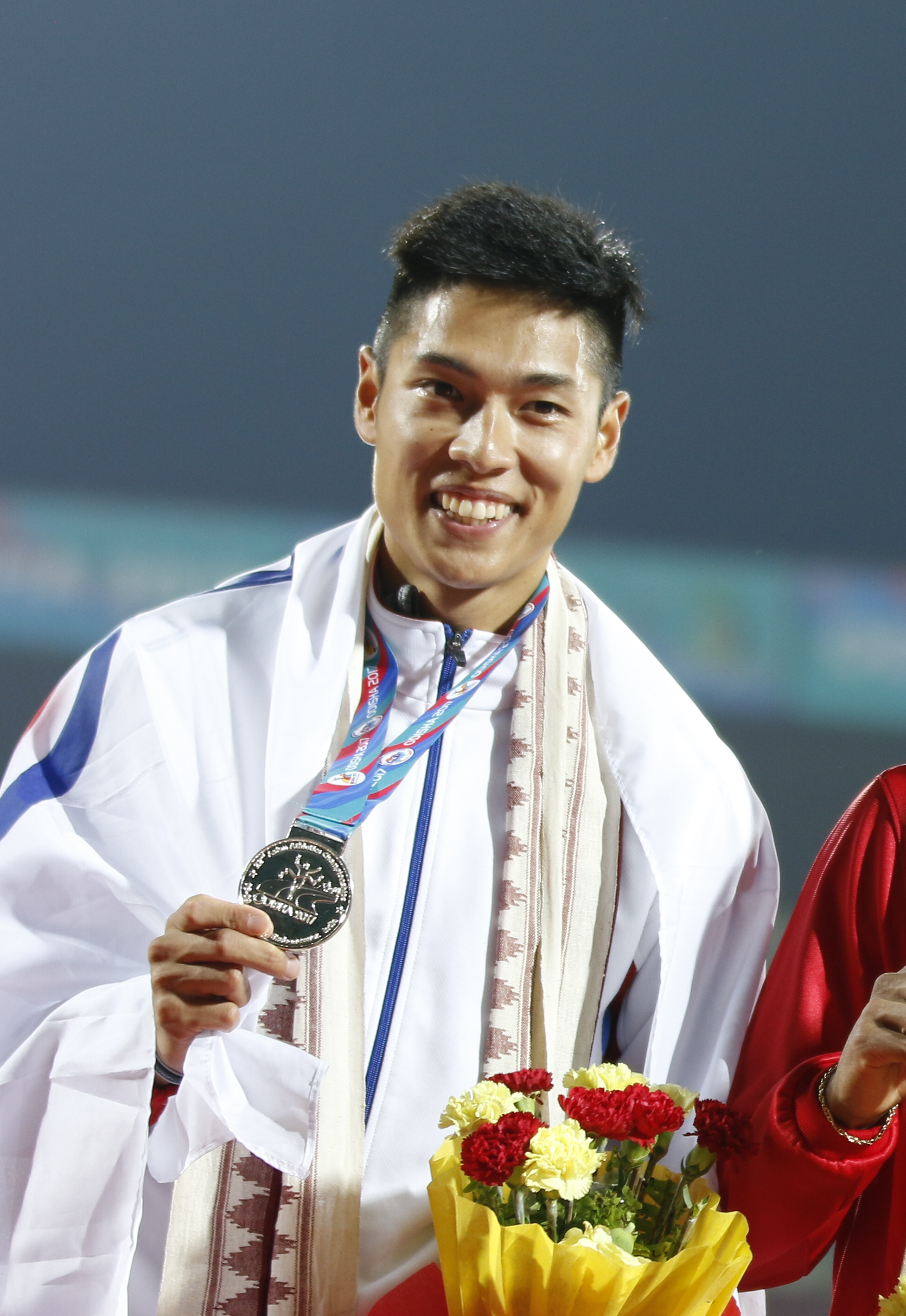
Chen Chieh, pro athlete

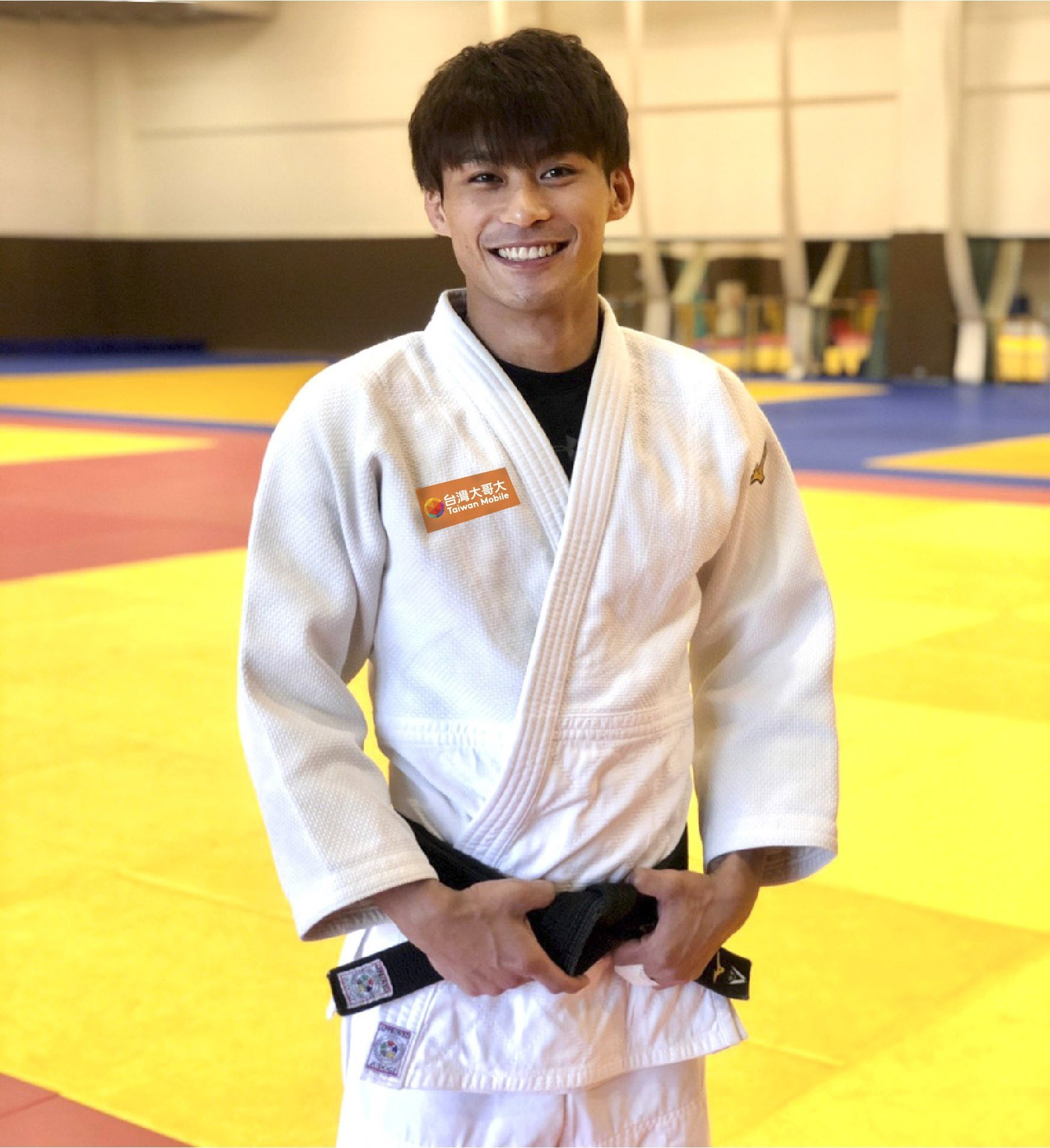
Yang Yung-wei, silver medalist of 2020 Summer Olympics

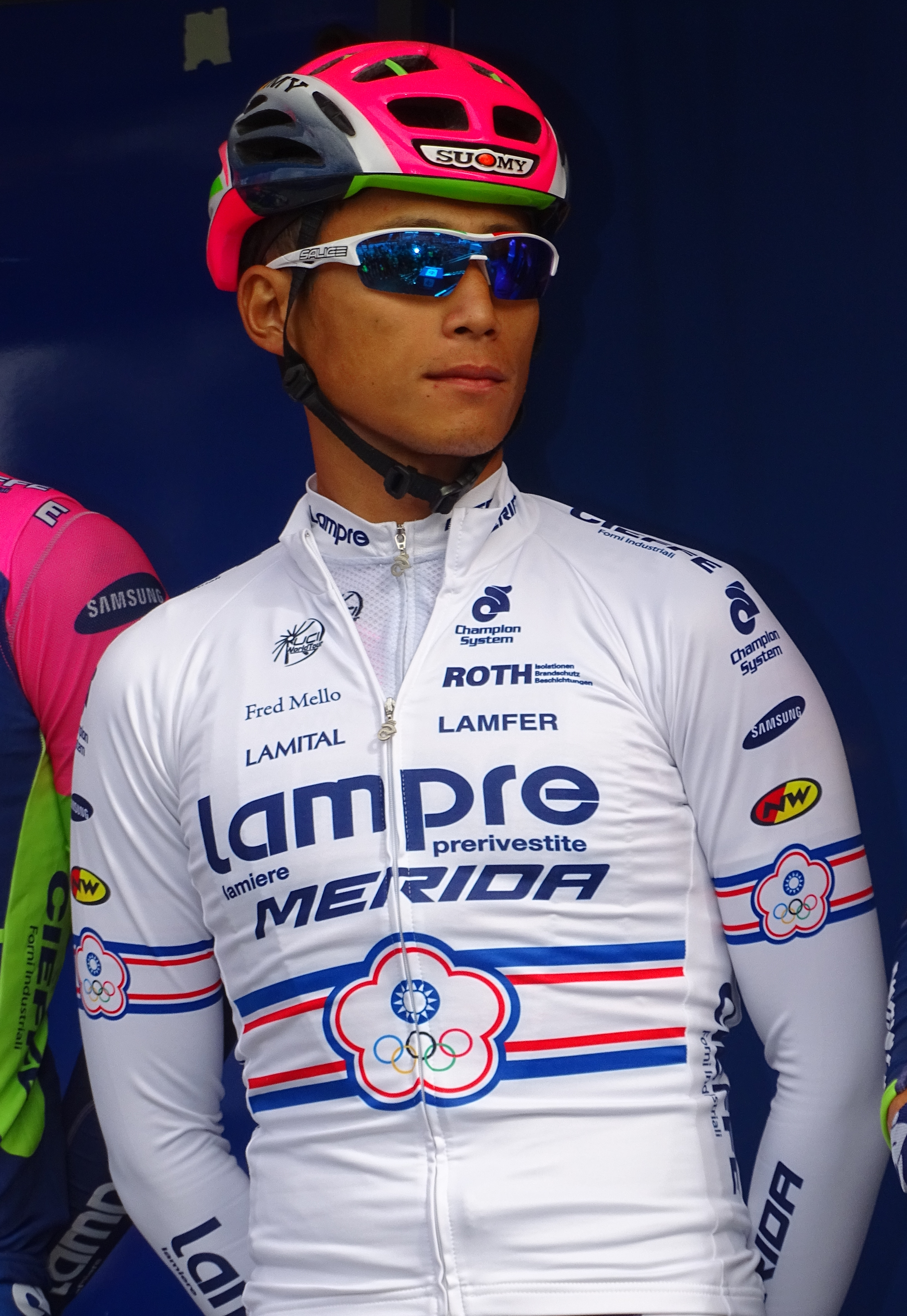
Feng Chun-kai, pro cyclist of Team Bahrain Victorious

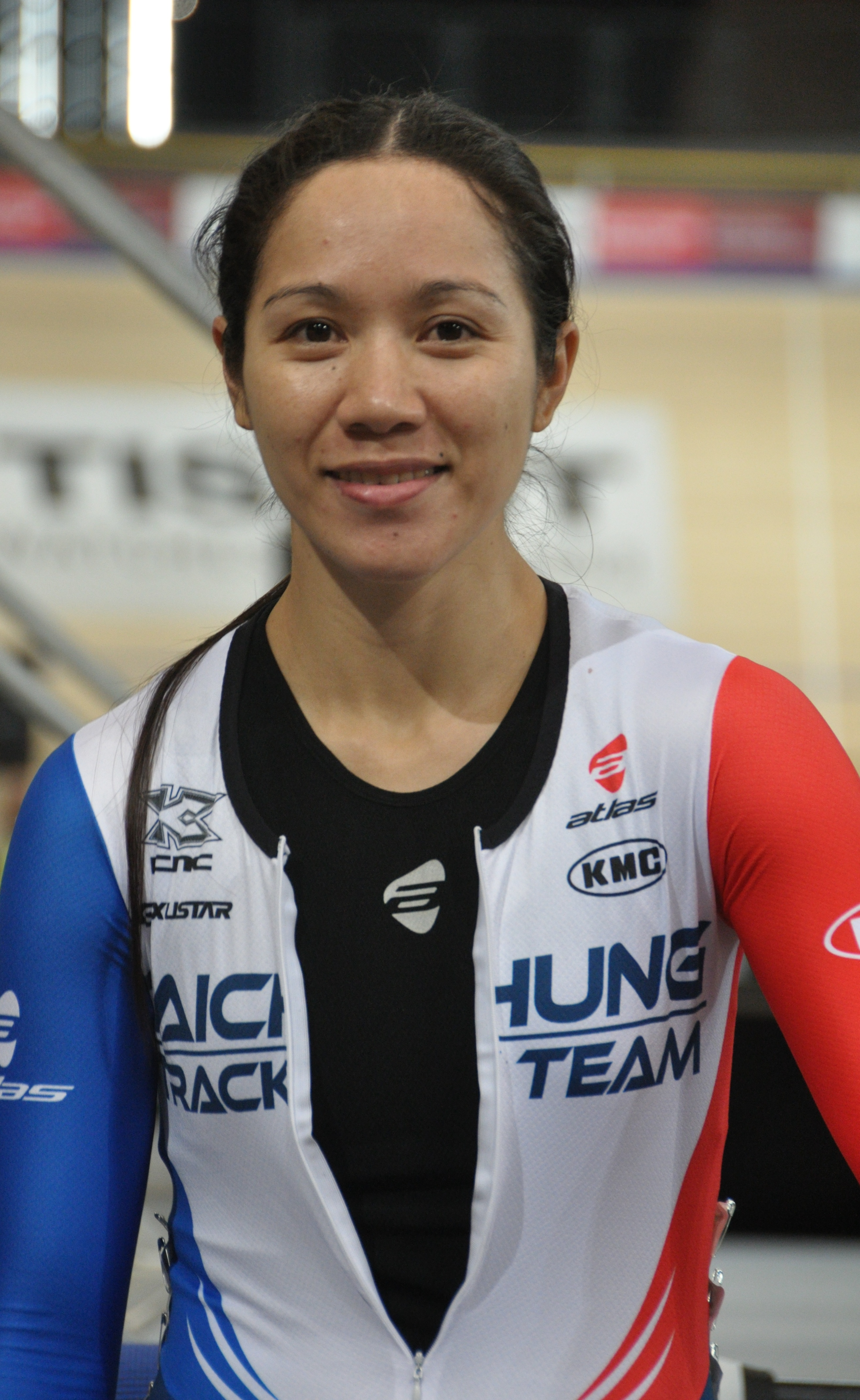
Hsiao Mei-yu, pro cyclist

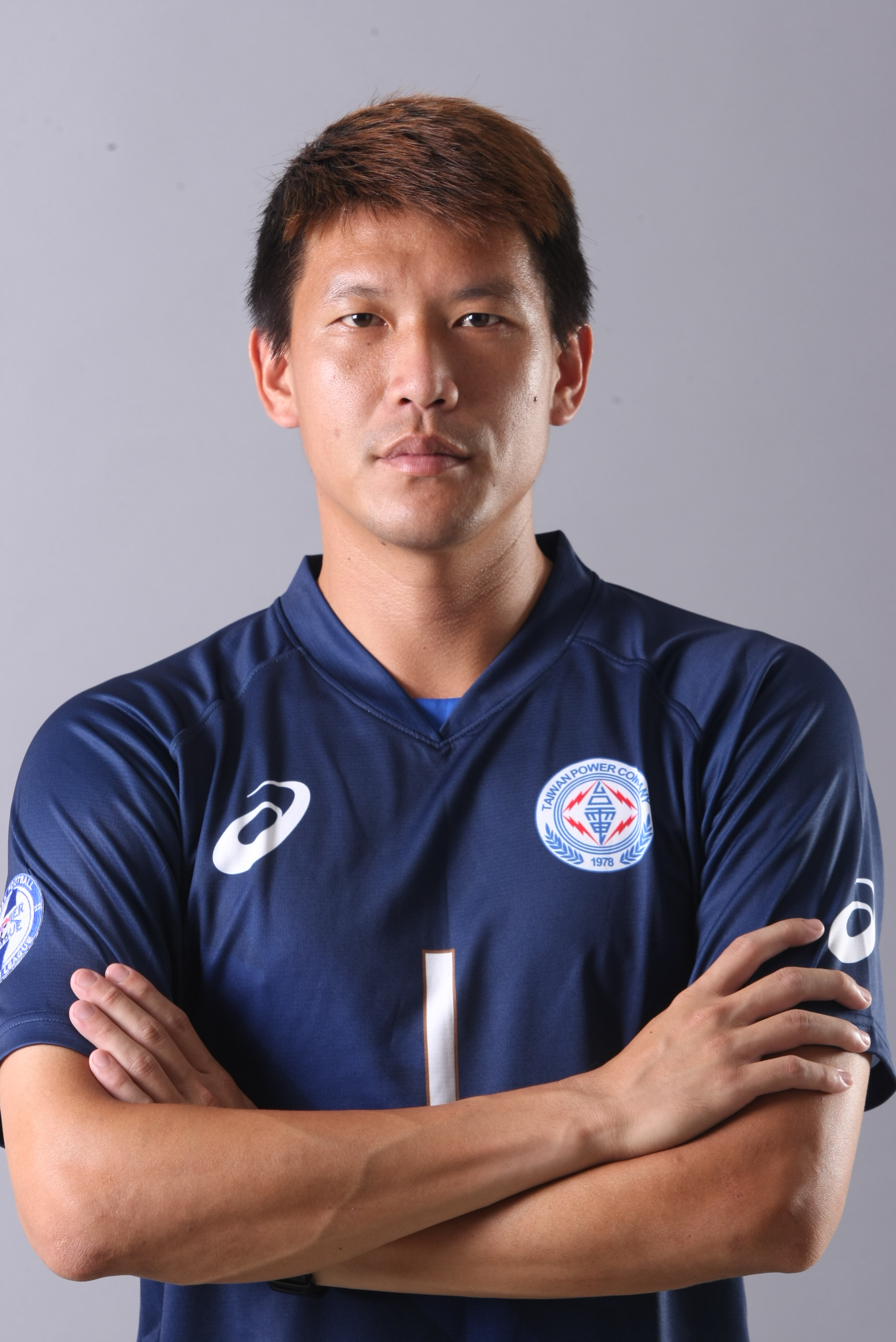
Lu Kun-chi, retired goalkeeper of Taiwan Power Company F.C.

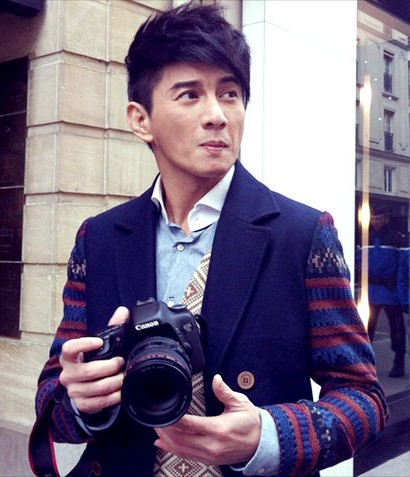
Nicky Wu, singer and actor

=== Faculty ===
Notable present and past NTUS faculty include:

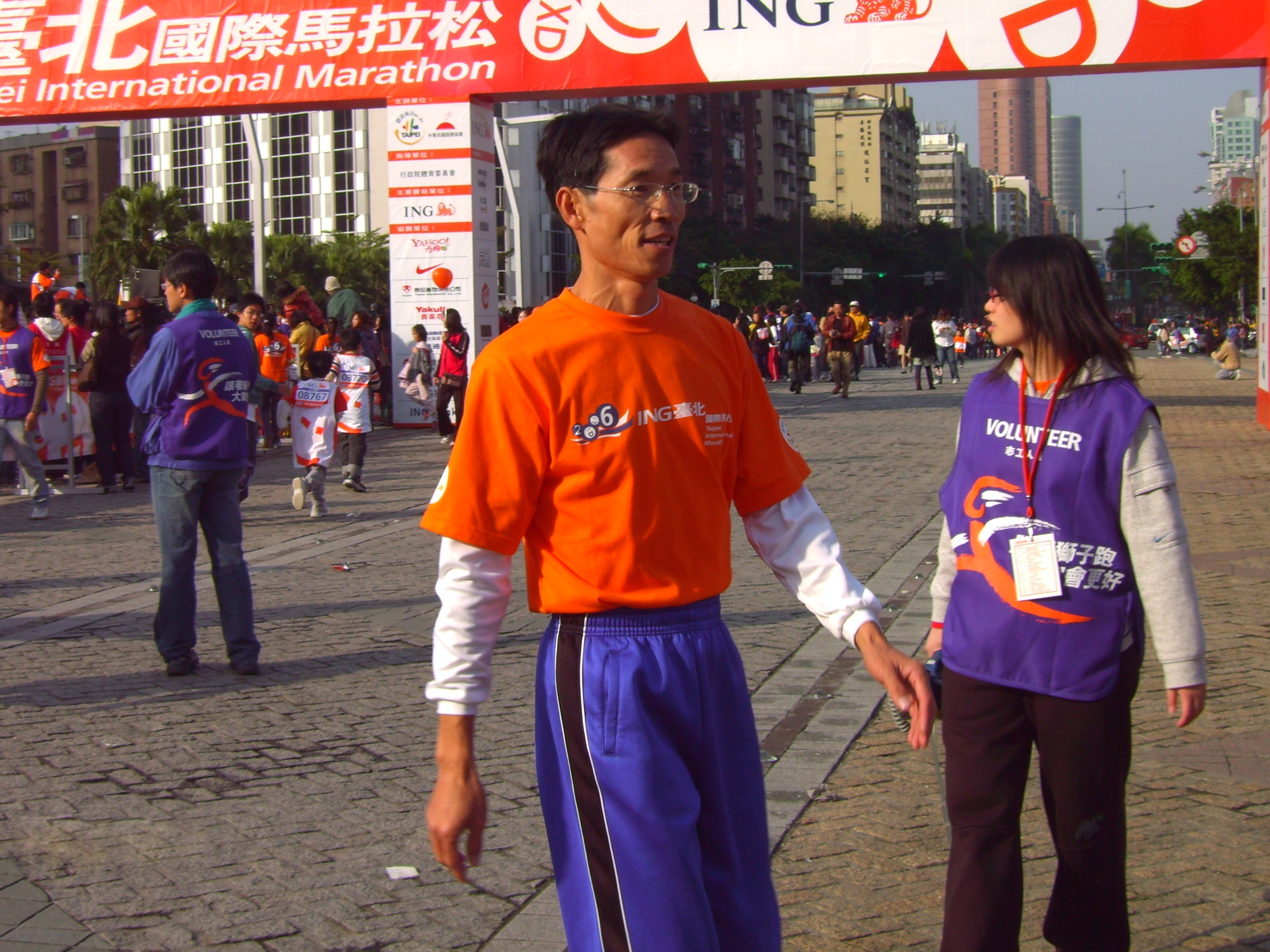
Hsu Gi-sheng, long-distance running club & school team coach of NTUS

== Transportation ==
=== Taichung City Bus ===
| Initiating station | Terminal station | Route | Remark |
|---|---|---|---|
| Taichung railway station | Taichung First Senior High School | Route 7 Route 50; Route 59; Route 65; Route 270; Route 276 | |
| Taichung HSR station | Taichung First Senior High School | Route 159 | |
| Taichung HSR station | Taichung Tech | Route 26; Route 82; Route 99 Extend | |
| Taichung HSR station | Chungyo Department Store | Route 99 | |

== Relevant articles ==
- National Taiwan Sport University
- University of Taipei (Tianmu Campus)
- List of universities in Taiwan
