= Taichung Football Field =

Football venue in Xitun, Taichung, Taiwan

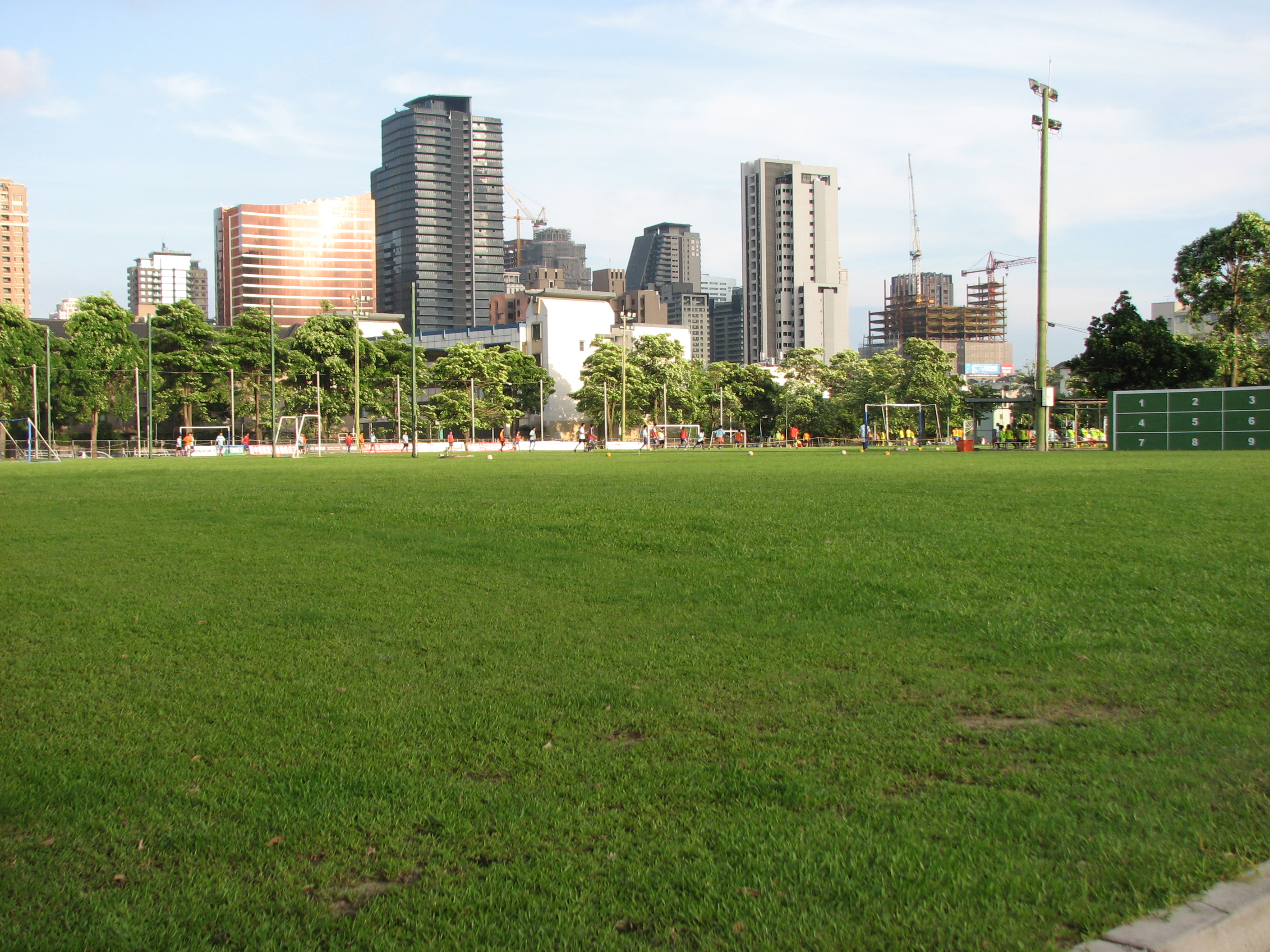
- Interactive map of Taichung Football Field
- Location: Xitun, Taichung, Taiwan
- Coordinates: 24°10′9″N 120°38′2″E
- Owner: Taichung City Government
- Capacity: 5,000
- Surface: Grass

Construction
- Opened: 1996

Tenants
- Hasus TSU; Taichung Futuro

Taichung Football Field, also known as Chaoma Football Field (Chinese: 朝馬足球場), is a football-specific venue located in Xitun District, Taichung, Taiwan. It has three 11-player football pitches, one 7-player pitch, one 5-player pitch, and three basketball courts. It is owned by Taichung City Government and presently operated by Taichung Football Commission.

== Major events ==
- 10 January 2020 - Taichung City FC holds their first tryouts session
- 17 January 2020 - Taichung City FC hold their second tryouts session

== See also ==
- List of stadiums in Taiwan
