= Chinese Taipei national under-23 football team =

Chinese Taipei U-23
- Association: Chinese Taipei Football Association (CTFA) 中華民國足球協會
- Head coach: Chen Jiunn-ming
- Home stadium: Taipei Stadium
- FIFA code: TPE
First colours	Second colours

First international
- China 3–1 Thailand (Bangkok, Thailand; 30 August 1959) as Chinese Taipei; Hong Kong 1–1 Chinese Taipei (British Hong Kong; 8 June 1991)

Biggest win
- China 7–2 Philippines (Tokyo, Japan; 3 October 1967) as Chinese Taipei; Chinese Taipei 4–1 Sri Lanka (Seoul, South Korea; 29 May 1999)

Biggest defeat
- Australia 11–0 Chinese Taipei (Adelaide, Australia; 7 February 2007)

The Chinese Taipei national under-23 football team (or Chinese Taipei national Olympic football team) is the national football team that represents Taiwan (Republic of China) in the Olympic Games.

== Naming scheme ==
The Taiwan national Olympic football team enters the Enterprise Football League with a different name every year.

- China Steel (2006)
- Fubon Financial (2007–2008)

== Results and fixtures ==
Matches in last 12 months, as well as any future scheduled matches

Legend

Win Draw Lose Fixture

== Coaching staff ==
=== Current coaching staff ===
As of 19 June 2025

Position	Name
Head coach	(Taiwan) Hung Ching-Huai
Assistant coach	(Taiwan) Su Te-Tasi (Taiwan) Lin Chi-Fu (Taiwan) Lee Yen-Ting
Goalkeeping coach	(Taiwan) Chen Chien-Chi
Physical coach	(Taiwan) Hsien Ting-Kai
Physiotherapist	(Taiwan) Liu Chen-pei
Managers	(Taiwan) Chang Kuo-Ling

=== Manager history ===
- (China) (Hong Kong) Lee Wai Tong (李惠堂), 1948–1964
- (China) (Hong Kong) Hsu King Shing (許竟成), 1968
- (Taiwan) Chang Teng-yun (張騰雲), 1972
- (Taiwan) (Hong Kong) Lo Pei (羅北), 1976–1988
- (Taiwan) Chiang Chia (江 洽), 1984
- (Taiwan) Lee Fu-tsai (李富財), 1992
- (Taiwan) (趙榮瑞), 1996
- (Taiwan) (陳信安), 2000
- (Federal Republic of Yugoslavia) Dragan Škorić, 2002
- (Taiwan) Peng Wu-sung (彭武松), 2004
- (Taiwan) Tsai Shang-ming (蔡尚明), ????–

== Players ==
The following 23 were selected for training for the 2026 AFC U-23 Asian Cup.

No.	Pos.	Player	Date of birth (age)	Club
6	GK	Chang Po-Feng		(Chinese Taipei Football Association) Hang Yuen F.C.
12	GK	Wang Pai-Han		(Chinese Taipei Football Association) University of Taipei (Tianmu)
14	GK	C hang Hsia-Chun		(Chinese Taipei Football Association) Taipower F.C.
1	DF	Huang Chun-Lin		(Chinese Taipei Football Association) Hang Yuen F.C.
3	DF	Huang Yung-Chun		(Chinese Taipei Football Association) Hang Yuen F.C.
4	DF	Wu Pai-Sheng		(Chinese Taipei Football Association) Hang Yuen F.C.
20	DF	Liang Meng-Hsin		(Chinese Taipei Football Association) FUTURO F.C.
22	DF	Kao Ching-Hang		(Chinese Taipei Football Association) Tunghai University
23	DF	Chien Pai-Ting		(Football Association of Hong Kong, China) Eastern District Sports Association
2	MF	Wang Pai-Ying		(Chinese Taipei Football Association) Hang Yuen F.C.
5	MF	Chang Ssu-Yu		(Chinese Taipei Football Association) Hang Yuen F.C.
7	MF	Tsai En-Chi		(Chinese Taipei Football Association) Hang Yuen F.C.
9	MF	Lin Tsung-Hung		(Chinese Taipei Football Association) Hang Yuen F.C.
10	MF	Lin Chen		(Chinese Taipei Football Association) Hang Yuen F.C.
11	MF	Wei Chih-Chuan		(Chinese Taipei Football Association) Hang Yuen F.C.
15	MF	Sun En-Chi		(Chinese Taipei Football Association) Hang Yuen F.C.
16	MF	Kao Kuan-Yu		(Chinese Taipei Football Association) Hang Yuen F.C.
17	MF	Ke Yueh-Ting		(Chinese Taipei Football Association) Hang Yuen F.C.
18	MF	Hsu Po-Chieh		(Chinese Taipei Football Association) Hang Yuen F.C.
19	MF	Wu Pei-Hsi		(Chinese Taipei Football Association) Ming Chuan University F.C.
8	FW	Chen Pao-Chun		(Chinese Taipei Football Association) Hang Yuen F.C.
13	FW	Lin Hai-Cheng		(Chinese Taipei Football Association) University of Taipei (Tianmu)
21	FW	Huang Wei-Chieh		(Chinese Taipei Football Association) A.C. Taipei

* Over-aged player.

== Competitive record ==
=== Olympic Games ===
For 1900 to 1988, see Taiwan national football team

Year	Result	Pos	P	W	D	L	F	A
(Spain) 1992 to (France) 2024	did not qualify							

=== AFC U-23 Asian Cup ===
Olympic Games Qualification

Year	Position	Preliminary stage						Final stage					
Year	Position	P	W	D	L	F	A	P	W	D	L	F	A
(Oman) 2013	27th	5	2	0	3	9	20	did not qualify					
(Qatar) 2016	27th	3	1	0	2	3	8	did not qualify					
(China) 2018	36th	3	0	0	3	2	14	did not qualify					
(Thailand) 2020	35th	3	0	1	2	1	15	did not qualify					
(Uzbekistan) 2022	32nd	2	0	0	2	0	2	did not qualify					
(Qatar) 2024	33rd	2	0	0	2	0	13	did not qualify					
(Saudi Arabia) 2026	40th	3	0	0	3	2	14	did not qualify					
(Japan) 2028	To be determined							To be determined					
Total		21	3	1	17	17	86	–	–	–	–	–	–

=== Asian Games ===
For 1951 to 1998, see Taiwan national football team

Year	Result	Pos	P	W	D	L	F	A
(South Korea) 2002 to (South Korea) 2014	did not enter							
(Indonesia) 2018	Group stage	25	4	0	1	3	0	10
(China) 2022	Group stage	18	3	1	0	2	2	6
(Japan) 2026	did not qualify							
Total	2/2	18	7	1	1	5	2	16

=== East Asian Games ===
- 2005: Group match

== See also ==
- Chinese Taipei national football team
