= Taiwan Power Company F.C. =

Taipower
- Full name: Taipower Company F.C. 台灣電力公司足球隊
- Nicknames: Nan-Ba-Tien (南霸天, Southern Overlord)
- Founded: 1978; 48 years ago
- Ground: Kaohsiung Nanzih Football Stadium
- Capacity: 1,200
- Owner: Taiwan Power Company
- Chairman: Chen Chieh-Ren
- Manager: Huang Che-Ming
- League: Taiwan Football Premier League
- 2025–26: TFPL, 7th of 8
Home colours	Away colours

Taiwan Power Company Football Club (Chinese: 台灣電力公司足球隊), often shortened to Taipower (Chinese: 台電) or (Chinese: 高市台電), is a Taiwanese professional football club based in Fongshan District, Kaohsiung City which currently competes in the Taiwan Football Premier League. The club was founded in 1978 and is affiliated with Taiwan Power, the country's national utility company.

Nicknamed Nan-Ba-Tien (Chinese: 南霸天, lit. Southern Overlord), Taipower are the most successful football club in Taiwan, having won 14 league titles, notably in 10 consecutive seasons from 1994 to 2004. With the exits of Flying Camel and Taipei City Bank F.C. in the late 1990s, Taipower and Tatung F.C. are the only two remaining football clubs never relegated from Taiwan Football Premier League. According to the Taipei Times, in the middle of the 1990s Taipower and Tatung reigned supreme in Taiwanese football. Taipower became the first Taiwanese club to win a major Asian title when they won the 2011 AFC President's Cup at home in Kaohsiung.

The team rented the field of Kaohsiung Municipal Chung-Cheng Industrial High School for practices in 2018.

== Current squad ==
Note: Flags indicate national team as defined under FIFA eligibility rules; some limited exceptions apply. Players may hold more than one non-FIFA nationality.

No.	Pos.	Nation	Player
1	GK	TPE	Huang Chiu-lin
2	FW	TPE	Yang Cheng-ying
3	DF	TPE	Huang Tzu-ming
4	DF	TPE	Fang Li-peng
5	DF	TPE	Chao Ming-hsiu (captain)
6	MF	TPE	Hong Yong-jyun
8	DF	TPE	Lee Jian-liang
9	FW	TPE	Gao Wei-jie
10	FW	TPE	Lee Hsiang-wei
11	DF	TPE	Hsieh Po-an
14	MF	TPE	Lin Chen
15	MF	TPE	Wu Yu-fan

No.	Pos.	Nation	Player
16	DF	TPE	Chang Cheng-yang
17	MF	TPE	Hsu Po-chieh
18	GK	TPE	Liu Chih-yu
19	DF	TPE	Liao Jie-yang
22	MF	TPE	Tu Shao-chieh
23	MF	TPE	Tseng Chih-wei
26	DF	TPE	Yen Ho-shen
27	MF	TPE	Yang He-chiang
29	FW	TPE	Lai Wei
31	GK	TPE	Chang Hsiang-chun
77	MF	TPE	Lai Chih-hsuan
99	MF	TPE	Chiu Po-jui

== Continental record ==
Season	Competition	Round	Club	Home	Away	Position
2005	AFC President's Cup	Group A	(Nepal) Three Star Club	1–1		3rd
2005	AFC President's Cup	Group A	(Tajikistan) Regar-TadAZ	0–3		3rd
2005	AFC President's Cup	Group A	(Bhutan) Transport United	1–0		3rd
2008	AFC President's Cup	Group B	(Cambodia) Nagacorp FC	2–2		3rd
2008	AFC President's Cup	Group B	(Kyrgyzstan) Dordoi-Dynamo	0–3		3rd
2009	AFC President's Cup	Group A	Nepal Police Club	3–2		3rd
2009	AFC President's Cup	Group A	(Tajikistan) Regar-TadAZ	1–3		3rd
2009	AFC President's Cup	Group A	(Pakistan) WAPDA	1–3		3rd
2011	AFC President's Cup	Group C	(Turkmenistan) Balkan	1–1		1st
2011	AFC President's Cup	Group C	(Pakistan) WAPDA	3–0		1st
2011	AFC President's Cup	Group C	Nepal Police Club	1–0		1st
2011	AFC President's Cup	Final stage Group A	(Tajikistan) Istiqlol	2–0		1st
2011	AFC President's Cup	Final stage Group A	(Turkmenistan) Balkan	4–3		1st
2011	AFC President's Cup	Final	(Cambodia) Phnom Penh Crown	3–2		Champions
2012	AFC President's Cup	Group A	(Mongolia) Erchim	1–0		1st
2012	AFC President's Cup	Group A	(Pakistan) KRL	0–0		1st
2012	AFC President's Cup	Final Stage; Group B	(Palestine) Markaz Shabab Al-Am'ari	1–1		2nd
2012	AFC President's Cup	Final Stage; Group B	(Pakistan) KRL	3–1		2nd
2013	AFC President's Cup	Group A	(Mongolia) Erchim	0–0		3rd
2013	AFC President's Cup	Group A	(Bangladesh) Abahani Limited Dhaka	1–1		3rd
2013	AFC President's Cup	Group A	(Nepal) Three Star Club	2–2		3rd
2020	AFC Cup	Preliminary round 2	(Mongolia) Ulaanbaatar City	N/A	N/A	N/A

== Honours ==
=== Domestic ===
- Taiwan Football Premier League / Intercity Football League / Enterprise Football League*
  - Champions (21): 1987, 1990, 1992, 1994, 1995, 1996, 1997, 1998, 1999, 2000–01, 2001–02, 2002–03, 2004, 2007, 2008, 2008, 2010, 2011, 2012, 2014, 2015-16
- CTFA Cup
  - Champions (3): 1997, 2000, 2002
- Enterprise Football League is formerly known as National Men's First Division Football League.

=== Continental ===
- AFC President's Cup
  - Champions: 2011
