= Tatung F.C. =

Taiwanese football club

Tatung 北市大同
- Full name: Taiwan Leopard Cat Football Club Tatung
- Short name: TLPFCT
- Founded: 1963; 63 years ago (as Tatung Football Club)
- Ground: Taipei Municipal Stadium
- Capacity: 20,000
- Chairman: Miao Poya
- Manager: Lo Chih-an
- League: Taiwan Football Premier League
- 2025–26: Taiwan Football Premier League, 6th of 8
| Home colours | Away colours |

Tatung Football Club (Chinese: 大同足球隊), also known as Leopard Cat Football Club, is a Taiwanese professional football club based in Taipei, that competes in the Taiwan Football Premier League. The club, affiliated with the electronics-producing Tatung Company, was founded in 1963 by a group of Tatung employees favoring football activities. They are among the first clubs to be owned by a private enterprise on Taiwan.

== History ==
The club has a long-standing rivalry with Taipower, as both are the most successful and most popular clubs in the country. In recent years, Leopard Cat has proved to be the dominant force on the island by winning the Taiwan Football Premier League three consecutive times. In 2006 AFC President's Cup, Tatung reached the semi-finals. In 2022, they announced a rebranding, following the consequences of Tatung Company's refusal from supporting the Tatung FC operations. They changed their name from Tatung FC to Leopard Cat, changed their crest, and their official colours, to avoid exclusion, or relegation of the Taiwan Football Premier League. After sufficient funds were raised to enable the team to play the next season in the TFPL, a realization of an election of supervisors and directors, and a general meeting successfully completed, Miao Poya was named the club's chairman. In 2025, they changed their name back to Tatung FC after receiving Tatung Company's naming sponsorship.

== Continental record ==
| Season | Competition | Round | Club | Home | Away | Position |
|---|---|---|---|---|---|---|
| 2006 | AFC President's Cup | Group A | Pakistan Army Football Club | 4–1 | | 2nd |
| 2006 | AFC President's Cup | Group A | (Cambodia) Khemara Kelia FC | 1–5 | | 2nd |
| 2006 | AFC President's Cup | Group A | (Bhutan) Transport United | 5–0 | | 2nd |
| 2006 | AFC President's Cup | Semifinal | (Tajikistan) FC Khatlon | 1–3 | | |
| 2007 | AFC President's Cup | Group B | (Nepal) Mahendra Police Club | 0–0 | | 4th |
| 2007 | AFC President's Cup | Group B | (Cambodia) Khemara Kelia FC | 0–1 | | 4th |
| 2007 | AFC President's Cup | Group B | (Kyrgyzstan) Dordoi Dynamo | 0–5 | | 4th |
| 2014 | AFC President's Cup | Group B | (Turkmenistan) HTTU Ashgabat | 0–2 | | 4th |
| 2014 | AFC President's Cup | Group B | (Philippines) Ceres-Negros FC | 0–2 | | 4th |
| 2014 | AFC President's Cup | Group B | (North Korea) Rimyongsu Sports Club | 0–5 | | 4th |
| 2017 | AFC Cup | Qualifying; Group C | (Bhutan) F.C. Tertons | 0–0 | | 2nd |
| 2017 | AFC Cup | Qualifying; Group C | (Bangladesh) Sheikh Russell KC | 1–1 | | 2nd |
| 2020 | AFC Cup | Group I | (Macau) Chao Pak Kei | cancelled | | |
| 2020 | AFC Cup | Group I | (Hong Kong) Tai Po | cancelled | | |
| 2020 | AFC Cup | Group I | Winners of Play-off East Asia | cancelled | | |

== Honours ==
=== Domestic ===
- Taiwan Football Premier League
  - Champions (3): 2017, 2018, 2019
- Intercity Football League
  - Champions (2): 2007, 2013
- Enterprise Football League
  - Champions (2): 2005, 2006
- CTFA Cup
  - Champions (3): 1990, 1996, 2005
- President's Cup
  - Champions (2): 1997, 1998
- Enterprise Football League is formerly known as National Men's First Division Football League.

=== Invitational ===
- Peace Invitational Challenge Cup: 2006
- World Chinese Cup Invitational Championship: 2005
- Hawaii Challenge Cup: 2005
