= National Sports Training Center football team =

NSTC
- Full name: National Sports Training Center
- Founded: 1960
- Dissolved: 2019
- Ground: Tainan County Stadium
- Capacity: 30,000
- Chairman: Chang Chia-Kuang
- Manager: Peng Wu-Song
Home colours	Away colours

National Sports Training Center is a former football team based in Tainan, and was the football club for Taiwan's National Sports Training Center. It was merged in 2003 with the Lukuang football team, Taiwan's land army football team, after the option of alternate service in the Taiwanese militia. It participated in Taiwan Football Premier League. The football team is disbanded in 2019.

== History ==
Formerly known as the Lukuang football team (Chinese: 陸光足球隊; pinyin: Lùguāng zúqiúduì) or Taiwan Army football team, the NTSC football team belonged to the Republic of China Army and competed in the Chinese Taipei National Football League.

Since the Republic of China has the policy of conscription for all male citizens, qualified footballers could choose to join the Lukuang football team instead of the regular militia service after passing the tryouts. It helped the players to keep their form and provided additional selection and management to the Chinese Taipei national football team. As a result, most national team members have played for Lukuang.

In 2000, Lukuang quit the league due to military reform, but returned in 2003 under the new name of Taiwan National Sports Training Center football team and are affiliated with Taiwan's National Sports Training Center.

In 2018, due to changes in military conscription policy, the service period for conscription had shortened. This led to the football team having to loan players for the year. In 2019, due to insufficient players, the football team had decided to disband. This is the third NSTC team, following volleyball and baseball, to be disbanded.

== Naming Scheme ==
The Taiwan NSTC football team entered the Enterprise Football League with a different name almost every year.

- 2006: Fubon Financial Holding Co. (富邦金控)
- 2007: Chateau Beach Resort Kenting (墾丁夏都沙灘酒店)
- 2008: National Sports Training Center (國家運動選手訓練中心)

== 2018 squad ==
Note: Flags indicate national team as defined under FIFA eligibility rules; some limited exceptions apply. Players may hold more than one non-FIFA nationality.

No.	Pos.	Nation	Player
1	GK	TPE	Chu Liang-yi (朱良毅)
2	DF	TPE	Lin Yu-ting
3	MF	TPE	Lin Jian-ting
4	DF	TPE	Chou Chen-chung
6	MF	TPE	Dai Hung-hsu
7	FW	TPE	Huang Chu-hsuan
8	MF	TPE	Wang Tzu-min
9	MF	TPE	Lo Chih-an (羅志安)
10	MF	TPE	Cheng Ching-hsua
11	MF	TPE	Wu Kuo-chi
12	GK	TPE	Shih Hsin-an
14	MF	TPE	Hsieh Meng-hsuan
15	MF	TPE	Kuo Tsu-hao

No.	Pos.	Nation	Player
16	FW	TPE	Chen Ting-wei
17	DF	TPE	Chen Wei-chuan (陳威全)
18	FW	TPE	Hsu Heng-pin
19	MF	TPE	Chen Chia-kun
20	DF	TPE	Chen Wei-chou
21	DF	TPE	Peng Hung-wei
22	DF	TPE	Wu Yueh-hwa
23	MF	TPE	Wei Ting-hsiang
24	MF	TPE	Yang Chia-huang
25	MF	TPE	Chen Yi-hung
26	MF	TPE	Chen Hung-hao
27	MF	TPE	Yang Chao-hsun (楊朝勛)
28	MF	TPE	Sa Yi-chun (薩宜軍)
30	GK	TPE	Kuo Chen-wei (郭宸瑋)

* Name spellings of some players have yet been confirmed. See zh:台灣國訓足球隊 for their Chinese names.

== Achievements ==
As Lukuang

- Chinese Taipei National Football League:
  - Runners-up (2): 1984, 1991

As NSTC

- Chinese Taipei National Football League:
  - Runners-up (1): 2007

== Managers ==
- Jong Chien-wu (鍾劍武), 1991

== See also ==
- Conscription in the Republic of China
- Military of the Republic of China
