= List of Taichung Futuro players =

The list includes all players who have participated in at least one league match for Taichung Futuro since the team's first Taiwan Football Premier League season in 2019. Players who were on the roster but never played a game are not listed.

== Key ==
Italics	Currently playing for Taichung Futuro
**Bold**	Record league goals or appearances

== List of players ==
- Appearance and goal totals only include matches in Taiwan Football Premier League. Substitute appearances are included.
- Statistics are correct through the end of the 2025–26 season.

Name	Nationality	Position	Taichung Futuro season(s)	Captaincy	League appearances	League goals	League clean sheets	Refs
Chen Chao-an	Taiwan	FW	2019	—	20	6	—	
Chen Ting-wei	Taiwan	FW	2019	—	9	0	—	
Chou Ching-shun	Taiwan	MF	2019	—	4	0	—	
Luis Galo	Honduras	DF	2019	—	6	1	—	
Taisei Kaneko	Japan	FW	2019	—	5	2	—	
Lee Hsiang-wei	Taiwan	DF	2019	—	12	3	—	
Li Kai-jie	Taiwan	FW	2019	—	15	1	—	
Liao Tzu-hao	Taiwan	MF	2019	—	1	0	—	
Fadera Siaka	Gambia	MF	2019	—	1	0	—	
Shun Takada	Japan	MF	2019	—	19	3	—	
Shunkun Tani	Japan	GK	2019	—	7	0	3	
Tsai Shuo-che	Taiwan	GK	2019	—	4	0	0	
Tu Kuang-yu	Taiwan	MF	2019	—	2	0	—	
Wang Kuan-ju	Taiwan	DF	2019	—	19	0	—	
Chao Ming-hsiu	Taiwan	DF	2019–2020	—	19	1	—	
Hung Tzu-kuei	Taiwan	DF	2019–2020	—	41	4	—	
Yugo Ichiyanagi	Japan	DF	2019–2020	—	39	1	—	
Calum Togneri	Northern Ireland	MF	2019–2020	—	8	0	—	
Chen Sheng-wei	Taiwan	FW	2019–2020; 2022	—	21	7	—	
Li Chung-yun	Taiwan	FW	2019–2021	—	29	3	—	
Liao Yi-shih	Taiwan	MF	2019–2021	—	4	0	—	
Lin Chien-liang	Taiwan	MF	2019–2021	—	23	0	—	
Seiji Fujiwara	Japan	MF	2019–2022	—	3	0	—	
Chen Ting-yang	Taiwan	DF	2019–	2020–	107	8	—	
Hsu Heng-pin	Taiwan	MF	2019–	—	69	5	—	
Yoshitaka Komori	Japan; Taiwan (Note: Naturalized in 2021.)	MF	2019–	—	100	1	—	
Li Mao	Taiwan	FW	2019–	2019	122	31	—	
Keisuke Ogawa	Japan	DF	2019–	—	96	1	—	
Tuan Yu	Taiwan	GK	2019–	—	53	0	27	
Kuo Yao-hua	Taiwan	MF	2020	—	2	0	—	
Kohei Ueda	Japan	DF	2020	—	16	0	—	
Keita Yamauchi	Japan	MF	2020	—	19	1	—	
Chen Chi-wei	Taiwan	FW	2020–2021	—	10	1	—	
Jiang Hao-ren	Taiwan	MF	2020–2021	—	29	3	—	
Joo Ik-seong	South Korea	FW	2020–2021	—	33	21	—	
Kenshin Katata	Japan	GK	2020–2021	—	1	0	0	
Mun Te-su	South Korea	FW	2020–2021	—	15	0	—	
Wu Meng-chi	Taiwan	DF	2020–2021	—	6	0	—	
Jun Kochi	Japan	GK	2020–2022	—	6	0	3	
Wang Ruei	Taiwan	DF	2020–2022	—	16	0	—	
Lee Ming-wei	Taiwan	GK	2020–	—	5	0	4	
Chiu Po-jui	Taiwan	DF	2021	—	11	1	—	
Filip Engelman	Serbia	DF	2021	—	5	0	—	
Huang Sheng-chieh	Taiwan	FW	2021	—	5	1	—	
Massamba Sambou	Senegal	DF	2021	—	8	1	—	
Tuan Hsuan	Taiwan	GK	2021	—	10	0	4	
Naoyuki Yamazaki	Japan	MF	2021	—	14	4	—	
Chen Hao-wei	Taiwan	FW	2021–2022	—	29	3	—	
Onur Dogan	Taiwan	FW	2021–2022	—	28	5	—	
Tu Shao-chieh	Taiwan	MF	2021–2022	—	22	0	—	
Shohei Yokoyama	Japan	MF	2021–2024; 2025–2026	—	65	18	—	
Chen Hung-wei	Taiwan	MF	2021–	—	69	3	—	
Liang Meng-hsin	Taiwan	MF	2021–	—	79	3	—	
Takeo Miyazaki	Japan	DF	2022	—	16	1	—	
Koki Narita	Japan	MF	2022	—	15	2	—	
Pan Wen-chieh	Taiwan	GK	2022	—	18	0	11	
Wu Chun-ching	Taiwan	MF	2022	—	17	0	—	
Matias Godoy	Chile	MF	2022–2023	—	6	1	—	
Takayuki Morimoto	Japan	FW	2022–2023	—	15	1	—	
Amari Oki	Japan	FW	2022–2023	—	8	1	—	
Jhon Benchy	Haiti	FW	2022–2024 (Note: Played in AFC Cup but left before the league had started.)	—	31	27	—	
Cheng Hao	Taiwan	DF	2022–	—	65	9	—	
Fang Ching-ren	Taiwan	FW	2023	—	2	0	—	
Kakeru Gunji	Japan	MF	2023	—	6	1	—	
Taiki Itsukaichi	Japan	GK	2023	—	1	0	0	
Naoki Kaneko	Japan	DF	2023	—	5	0	—	
Kazuya Kojima	Japan	MF	2023	—	4	0	—	
Kotaro Nakajima	Japan	FW	2023	—	4	0	—	
So Narita	Japan	DF	2023	—	8	0	—	
Shunya Suganuma	Japan	DF	2023	—	4	0	—	
Chen Chun-fu	Taiwan	DF	2023–2024	—	17	0	—	
Carlo Finotti	Taiwan	FW	2023–2024	—	6	1	—	
Tseng Te-lung	Taiwan	DF	2023–2026; 2026–	—	39	1	—	
Lin Che-yu	Taiwan	DF	2023–	—	35	1	—	
Kenya Matsui	Japan	GK	2023–	—	48	0	17	
Kaoru Takayama	Japan	MF	2023–	—	42	11	—	
Tsai Chieh-hsun	Taiwan	MF	2023–	—	19	3	—	
Toshio Shimakawa	Japan	MF	2024	—	12	1	—	
Takuro Uehara	Japan	DF	2024	—	20	2	—	
Koji Wada	Japan	DF	2024	—	4	0	—	
Li Ya-she	Taiwan	DF	2024–2026; 2026–	—	12	1	—	
Lin Chun-hua	Taiwan	GK	2024–2026	—	2	0	1	
Nagisa Sakurauchi	Japan	DF	2024–2026	—	40	4	—	
Liu Wei-che	Taiwan	DF	2024–	—	24	0	—	
Wen Chih-hao	Taiwan	MF	2024–	—	26	3	—	
Munkh-Orgil Orkhon	Mongolia	DF	2025–2026	—	18	1	—	
Peng Chuan-min	Taiwan	MF	2025–2026	—	1	0	—	
Lai Yi-chiao	Taiwan	MF	2025–	—	21	8	—	
Ryota Saito	Japan	MF	2025–	—	16	7	—	
Shoya Nagata	Japan	MF	2026	—	9	0	—	
Edison Castro	United States	GK	2026–	—	—	—	—	
Chang Heng	Taiwan	MF	2026–	—	—	—	—	
Lee Han-hee	South Korea	FW	2026–	—	—	—	—	
Lin Chun-chieh	Taiwan	DF	2026–	—	—	—	—	
Ren Nishimura	Japan	MF	2026–	—	—	—	—	
Oki Sakimoto	Japan	DF	2026–	—	—	—	—	
Su Ming-chiang	Taiwan	MF	2026–	—	—	—	—	
Tseng Sai-te	Taiwan	MF	2026–	—	—	—	—	
Wu Po-jui	Taiwan	FW	2026–	—	—	—	—	
