= 2020 Taichung Futuro season =

Taichung Futuro
2020 season
- Owner: Yoshitaka Komori
- Head coach: ~~Toshiaki Imai~~; Vom Ca-nhum
- TFPL: 3rd
- Top goalscorer: League: Joo Ik-seong (19); All: Joo Ik-seong (19)
- Biggest win: Taichung Futuro 4–0 Red Lions; Taichung Futuro 4–0 Land Home NTUS; Taichung Futuro 4–0 Red Lions
- Biggest defeat: Tatung 1–0 Taichung Futuro; Tainan City TSG 1–0 Taichung Futuro; Taichung Futuro 1–2 Tatung; Tainan City TSG 2–1 Taichung Futuro; Taipower 1–0 Taichung Futuro; Ming Chuan University 1–0 Taichung Futuro
Home colours	Away colours

The 2020 Taichung Futuro season was the club's 2nd season and their 2nd season in Taiwan Football Premier League. Toshiaki Imai was appointed as their manager. Vom Ca-nhum succeed the managerial position after Imai had resigned during the middle of the season.

== Management team ==
Position	Name
Head coach	(Chinese Taipei) Vom Ca-nhum
Assistant coach	(Chinese Taipei) Juang Ming-yan
Fitness coach	(Japan) Yuya Sugimoto
Kit Manager	(Japan) Kaori Katsu
Team Assistant	(Japan) Haruka Sugi

- Last updated: 8 May 2024

== Players ==
N	Pos.	Nat.	Name	Age.	Since
Goalkeepers
1	GK	(Japan)	Jun Kochi	37	2020
21	GK	(Chinese Taipei)	Tuan Yu	26	2019
34	GK	(Chinese Taipei)	Chen Jih-yang	20	2020
35	GK	(Chinese Taipei)	Lee Ming-wei	23	2020
36	GK	(Chinese Taipei)	Tsai Chih-hsin	27	2020
37	GK	(Japan)	Kenshin Katata	21	2020
Defenders
2	DF	(Chinese Taipei)	Wu Meng-chi	21	2020
3	DF	(Chinese Taipei)	Chen Ting-yang (captain)	28	2019
4	DF	(Chinese Taipei)	Hung Tzu-kuei	27	2019
5	DF	(Japan)	Yugo Ichiyanagi	35	2019
6	DF	(Chinese Taipei)	Chao Ming-hsiu	23	2019
7	DF	(Japan)	Keisuke Ogawa	34	2019
23	DF	(Chinese Taipei)	Juang Ming-yan	31	2020
24	DF	(Japan)	Kohei Ueda	22	2020
31	DF	(Chinese Taipei)	Li Yi-ming	26	2020
33	DF	(Chinese Taipei)	Wang Ruei	27	2020
Midfielders
8	MF	(Japan)	Yoshitaka Komori	33	2019
10	MF	(Japan)	Keita Yamauchi	26	2020
14	MF	(Chinese Taipei)	Liao Yi-shih	25	2019
17	MF	(Chinese Taipei)	Hsu Heng-pin	27	2019
18	MF	(Chinese Taipei)	Kuo Yao-hua	22	2020
19	MF	(Japan)	Seiji Fujiwara	44	2019
27	MF	(Chinese Taipei)	Jiang Hao-ren	23	2020
32	MF	(Northern Ireland)	Calum Togneri	31	2019
38	MF	(Chinese Taipei)	Tsai Hsien-chieh	18	2020
88	MF	(Chinese Taipei)	Lin Chien-liang	26	2019
Forwards
9	FW	(Chinese Taipei)	Li Mao	28	2019
11	FW	(South Korea)	Joo Ik-seong	28	2020
15	FW	(South Korea)	Mun Te-su	26	2020
26	FW	(Chinese Taipei)	Li Chung-yun	26	2019
30	FW	(Chinese Taipei)	Chen Chi-wei	20	2020

== Transfers ==
=== In ===
No.	Pos.	Player	Transferred from	Source
Preseason
1	GK	Jun Kochi	(Japan) Tokyo 23	
2	DF	Wu Meng-chi	–	
10	MF	Keita Yamauchi	(Japan) YSCC Yokohama	
11	FW	Joo Ik-seong	(Chinese Taipei) Hang Yuan	
15	FW	Mun Te-su	(Japan) Osaka	
16	FW	Loal Peron	(Chinese Taipei) PlayOne NTNU	
18	MF	Kuo Yao-hua	–	
23	DF	Juang Ming-yan	–	
24	DF	Kohei Ueda	(Japan) YSCC Yokohama	
27	MF	Jiang Hao-ren	(Chinese Taipei) NTUS	
30	FW	Chen Chi-wei	(Australia) Nunawading City	
31	DF	Li Yi-ming	–	
34	GK	Chen Jih-yang	–	
Midseason
33	DF	Wang Ruei	(Hong Kong) Yuen Long	
35	GK	Lee Ming-wei	(Chinese Taipei) Ming Chuan University	
36	GK	Tsai Chih-hsin	–	
37	GK	Kenshin Katata	(Chinese Taipei) Babuza	
38	MF	Tsai Hsien-chieh	–	

=== Out ===
No.	Pos.	Player	Transferred to	Fee	Source
Preseason
1	GK	Ling Ting-hsun	–		
2	DF	Luis Galo	(Chinese Taipei) Tatung		
9	FW	Taisei Kaneko	(Japan) YSCC Yokohama	Loan return	
10	FW	Chen Chao-an	(Chinese Taipei) Taipower		
13	FW	Shih Chun-chieh	–		
15	MF	Shun Takada	–		
16	FW	Chen Ting-wei	–		
18	GK	Shunkun Tani	(Japan) YSCC Yokohama	Loan return	
22	MF	Tu Kuang-yu	–		
27	FW	Li Kai-jie	–		
29	MF	Chou Ching-shun	–		
55	DF	Wang Kuan-ju	–		
Midseason
16	FW	Loal Peron	(Chinese Taipei) PlayOne NTNU		
45	FW	Chen Sheng-wei	(Chinese Taipei) Inter Taoyuan		

== Preseason and friendlies ==
12 January 2020 Friendly	Chonburi U19 (Thailand)	2–2	(Chinese Taipei) Taichung Futuro	Ban Bueng
			Mun Te-su; Fujiwara	Stadium: Chonburi FC Academy

16 January 2020 Friendly	Samut Prakan City (Thailand)	4–0	(Chinese Taipei) Taichung Futuro	Yan Nawa
17:00 (UTC+7)	Sarakham 64', 69'; Wingwon 79', 84'			Stadium: Kiarti Thanee Football Camp

6 September 2020 Friendly	Chinese Taipei	4–1	Taichung Futuro	Kaohsiung
	Chen Chao-an 26'; Lee Hsiang-wei 41'; Gao Wei-jie 55'; Kao Chun-hung 86'		Li Mao 45'	Stadium: National Stadium

== Competitions ==
=== Overall record ===
Competition	First match	Last match	Starting round	Final position	Record							
Competition	First match	Last match	Starting round	Final position	Pld	W	D	L	GF	GA	GD	Win %
TFPL	12 April 2020	29 November 2020	Matchday 1	3rd	21	12	3	6	33	17	+16	57.14
Total					21	12	3	6	33	17	+16	57.14

Source: TFPL

=== Taiwan Football Premier League ===
==== League table ====
Pos	Team	Pld	W	D	L	GF	GA	GD	Pts	Qualification or relegation
1	Tainan City TSG (C)	21	16	0	5	58	26	+32	48	Qualification for the AFC Cup group stage
2	Taipower	21	14	4	3	41	27	+14	46	
3	Taichung Futuro	21	12	3	6	33	17	+16	39	
4	Tatung	21	12	2	7	47	24	+23	38	
5	Hang Yuen	21	9	6	6	24	20	+4	33	
6	Land Home NTUS	21	6	2	13	27	50	−23	20	
7	Red Lions	21	2	3	16	19	58	−39	9	Transfer to 2021 Taiwan Football Premier League qualifiers
8	Ming Chuan University (R)	21	2	2	17	21	48	−27	8	Relegation to Taiwan Second Division Football League

(C) Champions; (R) Relegated

==== Results by round ====
Round	1	2	3	4	5	6	7	8	9	10	11	12	13	14	15	16	17	18	19	20	21
Result	W	D	D	W	D	W	W	W	W	L	L	W	W	W	W	L	W	L	L	W	L
Position	4	3	4	3	4	4	1	1	1	2	2	2	3	1	1	3	2	3	3	3	3

Source: TFPL
W = Win; D = Draw; L = Loss

==== Matches ====
12 April 2020 1	Taichung Futuro	2–1	Land Home NTUS	Tainan
16:00 (UTC+8)	Chen Ting-yang 51'; Hung Tzu-kuei 80'		Huang Tzu-ming 90+3'	Stadium: Tainan Municipal Football Field; Attendance: 0

19 April 2020 2	Hang Yuan	1–1	Taichung Futuro	New Taipei
16:00 (UTC+8)	Tsou Yu-chieh (yellow card) 58' (red card) 90+5'; Wu Yen-shu 66'	Recap	Li Mao 12' (yellow card) 90+4'; Chao Ming-hsiu (yellow card) 61'; Lin Chien-liang (yellow card) 88'	Stadium: Fu Jen Catholic University; Attendance: 0 Referee: Chen Hsin-chuan

26 April 2020 3	Taichung Futuro	2–2	Tatung	Hsinchu County
16:00 (UTC+8)	Chen Ting-yang 33'; Chen Chi-wei 52'; Hung Tzu-kuei (yellow card) 72'	Recap	Kouame 49'; Lin Chih-hsuan (yellow card) 60'; Chang Hao-wei 77'; Chen Jui-chieh (yellow card) 78'	Stadium: National Taiwan University Zhubei Campus; Attendance: 0 Referee: Yu Ming-hsun

3 May 2020 4	Tainan City TSG	0–1	Taichung Futuro	Tainan
16:00 (UTC+8)	Liu Ho-han (yellow card) 63'	Recap	Ogawa (yellow card) 25'; Chao Ming-hsiu (yellow card) 33'; Joo Ik-seong 58'; Kochi (yellow card) 83'; Chen Chi-wei (yellow card) 90+5'	Stadium: Tainan Municipal Football Field; Attendance: 0 Referee: Chen Jia-hao

10 May 2020 5	Taichung Futuro	0–0	Taipower	Taichung
16:00 (UTC+8)	Ichiyanagi (yellow card) 43'; Chao Ming-hsiu (yellow card) 54'	Recap	Lin Chien-hsun (yellow card) 72'; Chan Che-yuan (yellow card) 82'; Lin Yueh-han (yellow card) 90+3'	Stadium: Taiyuan Football Field; Attendance: 0 Referee: Chen Hsin-chuan

17 May 2020 6	Taichung Futuro	4–0	Red Lions	Taoyuan
16:00 (UTC+8)	Hsu Heng-pin (yellow card) 27'; Joo Ik-seong 41', 45+3', 58'; Li Chung-yun 90+4'	Recap		Stadium: National Taiwan Sport University; Attendance: 0 Referee: Ko Chuan-yao

24 May 2020 7	Ming Chuan University	0–1	Taichung Futuro	Taoyuan
16:00 (UTC+8)	Chang Chia-wen (yellow card) 68'; Chien Peng-yen (yellow card) 90+3'	Recap	Chen Ting-yang 45+2'; Ogawa (yellow card) 82'	Stadium: Ming Chuan University; Attendance: 0 Referee: Chang Chih-chuan

14 June 2020 8	Land Home NTUS	2–3	Taichung Futuro	Taichung
16:00 (UTC+8)	Chen Po-yu 5', 90+4'	Recap	Joo Ik-seong 18', 85' (pen.); Yamauchi 56'; Hung Tzu-kuei (yellow card) 81'	Stadium: Taiyuan Football Field; Referee: Kuo Chia-hao

21 June 2020 9	Hang Yuan	0–1	Taichung Futuro	New Taipei
16:00 (UTC+8)	O'Gorman (yellow card) 62'; Aveska (yellow card) 85'; Liu Chia-ming (yellow card) 87'	Recap	Joo Ik-seong 39' (pen.); Chen Ting-yang (yellow card) 54'; Li Mao (yellow card) 69'; Ueda (yellow card) 72'	Stadium: Fu Jen Catholic University; Referee: Yu Ming-hsun

5 July 2020 10	Tatung	1–0	Taichung Futuro	Kaohsiung
16:00 (UTC+8)	Kouame 29'; Hung Shih-cheng (yellow card) 43'	Recap	Ichiyanagi (yellow card) 26'; Chen Ting-yang (yellow card) 35'	Stadium: National Stadium; Referee: Kuo Chan-yu

19 July 2020 11	Tainan City TSG	1–0	Taichung Futuro	Taoyuan
16:00 (UTC+8)	Estama 15' (yellow card) 17'; Yao Ko-chi (yellow card) 29'	Recap	Ogawa (yellow card) 58'; Ichiyanagi (yellow card) 79'	Stadium: National Taiwan Sport University; Referee: Chen Hsin-chuan

26 July 2020 12	Taipower	2–3	Taichung Futuro	Kaohsiung
16:00 (UTC+8)	Lai Chih-hsuan 13'; Lee Jian-liang (yellow card) 57'; Huang Han-sheng (yellow card) 72' (yellow-red card) 77'; Ko Yu-ting 87'	Recap	Joo Ik-seong 30', 53'; Hsu Heng-pin (red card) 65'; Li Chung-yun 90+7'	Stadium: National Stadium; Referee: Kuo Chan-yu

2 August 2020 13	Red Lions	1–3	Taichung Futuro	Hsinchu County
16:00 (UTC+8)	Lin Wei-chieh 49'; Lin Kuan-heng (yellow card) 57'	Recap	Li Mao 18'; Jiang Hao-ren 45'; Joo Ik-seong 81' (pen.)	Stadium: National Taiwan University Zhubei Campus; Referee: Yu Ming-hsun

9 August 2020 14	Ming Chuan University	0–1	Taichung Futuro	Taoyuan
16:00 (UTC+8)	Huang Yu-ming (yellow card) 59'; Wang Sheng-han (yellow card) 77'; Kuo Chia-cheng (yellow card) 86'	Recap	Jiang Hao-ren 49'; Chen Ting-yang (yellow card) 54'; Tuan Yu (yellow card) 85'; Hsu Heng-pin (yellow card) 90+2'	Stadium: Ming Chuan University; Referee: Kuo Chia-hao

13 September 2020 15	Taichung Futuro	4–0	Land Home NTUS	Taichung
16:00 (UTC+8)	Joo Ik-seong 30', 90', 90+4'; Jiang Hao-ren 42'	Recap		Stadium: Taiyuan Football Field; Referee: Yu Ming-hsun

20 September 2020 16	Taichung Futuro	1–2	Tatung	Hsinchu County
16:00 (UTC+8)	Joo Ik-seong 28'; Ogawa (yellow card) 72'; Ueda (yellow card) 79'; Ichiyanagi (yellow card) 87'	Recap	Chen Jui-chieh 51'; Hung Shih-cheng 67'; Pai Shao-yu (yellow card) 87'	Stadium: National Taiwan University Zhubei Campus; Referee: Chen Hsin-chuan

27 September 2020 17	Hang Yuan	0–1	Taichung Futuro	New Taipei
16:00 (UTC+8)	Hsu Yi (yellow card) 51'; Chen Ching-hsuan (yellow card) 66'	Recap	Joo Ik-seong 84'; Hung Tzu-kuei (yellow card) 90+7'	Stadium: Fu Jen Catholic University; Referee: Kuo Chia-hao

11 October 2020 18	Tainan City TSG	2–1	Taichung Futuro	New Taipei
16:00 (UTC+8)	Yu Chia-huang 50'; Chen Wei-jen (yellow card) 67'; Estama 86'	Recap	Joo Ik-seong 20'; Lin Chien-liang (yellow card) 90+4'	Stadium: Fu Jen Catholic University; Referee: Chen Hsin-chuan

25 October 2020 19	Taipower	1–0	Taichung Futuro	Kaohsiung
16:00 (UTC+8)	Lee Hsiang-wei 27'; Lee Jian-liang (yellow card) 45+1'; Hsieh Po-an (yellow card) 60'; Ko Yu-ting (yellow card) 87'	Recap	Hung Tzu-kuei (yellow card) 57'; Ichiyanagi (yellow card) 75'; Komori (yellow card) 81'	Stadium: National Stadium; Referee: Yu Ming-hsun

22 November 2020 20	Taichung Futuro	4–0	Red Lions	Taipei
16:00 (UTC+8)	Komori 25'; Joo Ik-seong 50' (pen.), 73', 82'; Tuan Yu (yellow card) 75'	Recap		Stadium: Taipei Municipal Stadium; Referee: Kuo Chia-hao

29 November 2020 21	Ming Chuan University	1–0	Taichung Futuro	Taoyuan
16:00 (UTC+8)	Tu Shao-chieh 30' (pen.)	Recap	Li Mao (yellow card) 26'; Hung Tzu-kuei (red card) 28'; Mun Te-su (yellow card) 90+2'	Stadium: Ming Chuan University; Referee: Lin Te-en

== Statistics ==
=== Squad statistics ===
No.	Pos	Nat	Player	Total		TMFL	
No.	Pos	Nat	Player	Apps	Goals	Apps	Goals
Goalkeepers
1	GK	(Japan) JPN	Jun Kochi	3	0	2+1	0
21	GK	(Chinese Taipei) TPE	Tuan Yu	16	0	16	0
34	GK	(Chinese Taipei) TPE	Chen Jih-yang	0	0	0	0
35	GK	(Chinese Taipei) TPE	Lee Ming-wei	4	0	2+2	0
36	GK	(Chinese Taipei) TPE	Tsai Chih-hsin	0	0	0	0
37	GK	(Japan) JPN	Kenshin Katata	1	0	1	0
Defenders
2	DF	(Chinese Taipei) TPE	Wu Meng-chi	2	0	0+2	0
3	DF	(Chinese Taipei) TPE	Chen Ting-yang	20	3	20	3
4	DF	(Chinese Taipei) TPE	Hung Tzu-kuei	20	1	20	1
5	DF	(Japan) JPN	Yugo Ichiyanagi	20	0	20	0
6	DF	(Chinese Taipei) TPE	Chao Ming-hsiu	12	0	12	0
7	DF	(Japan) JPN	Keisuke Ogawa	15	0	10+5	0
23	DF	(Chinese Taipei) TPE	Juang Ming-yan	0	0	0	0
24	DF	(Japan) JPN	Kohei Ueda	16	0	14+2	0
31	DF	(Chinese Taipei) TPE	Li Yi-ming	0	0	0	0
33	DF	(Chinese Taipei) TPE	Wang Ruei	7	0	7	0
Midfielders
8	MF	(Japan) JPN	Yoshitaka Komori	21	1	21	1
10	MF	(Japan) JPN	Keita Yamauchi	19	1	12+7	1
14	MF	(Chinese Taipei) TPE	Liao Yi-shih	0	0	0	0
17	MF	(Chinese Taipei) TPE	Hsu Heng-pin	12	0	6+6	0
18	MF	(Chinese Taipei) TPE	Kuo Yao-hua	2	0	0+2	0
19	MF	(Japan) JPN	Seiji Fujiwara	1	0	0+1	0
27	MF	(Chinese Taipei) TPE	Jiang Hao-ren	18	3	11+7	3
32	MF	(Northern Ireland) NIR	Calum Togneri	0	0	0	0
38	MF	(Chinese Taipei) TPE	Tsai Hsien-chieh	0	0	0	0
88	MF	(Chinese Taipei) TPE	Lin Chien-liang	10	0	4+6	0
Forwards
9	FW	(Chinese Taipei) TPE	Li Mao	21	2	21	2
11	FW	(South Korea) KOR	Joo Ik-seong	21	19	21	19
15	FW	(South Korea) KOR	Mun Te-su	11	0	2+9	0
26	FW	(Chinese Taipei) TPE	Li Chung-yun	13	2	0+13	2
30	FW	(Chinese Taipei) TPE	Chen Chi-wei	10	1	9+1	1
Own goals (0)

=== Goalscorers ===
Rank	No.	Pos.	Nat.	Player	TMFL	Total
1	11	FW	(South Korea)	Joo Ik-seong	19	19
2	3	DF	(Chinese Taipei)	Chen Ting-yang	3	3
2	27	MF	(Chinese Taipei)	Jiang Hao-ren	3	3
4	9	FW	(Chinese Taipei)	Li Mao	2	2
4	26	FW	(Chinese Taipei)	Li Chung-yun	2	2
6	4	DF	(Chinese Taipei)	Hung Tzu-kuei	1	1
6	8	MF	(Japan)	Yoshitaka Komori	1	1
6	10	MF	(Japan)	Keita Yamauchi	1	1
6	30	FW	(Chinese Taipei)	Chen Chi-wei	1	1
Own goals (from the opponents)					0	0
Totals					33	33

=== Hat-tricks ===
Player	Against	Result	Date	Competition	Ref
(South Korea) Joo Ik-seong	Red Lions	4–0	17 May 2020	Taiwan Football Premier League	
(South Korea) Joo Ik-seong	Land Home NTUS	4–0	13 September 2020	Taiwan Football Premier League	
(South Korea) Joo Ik-seong	Red Lions	4–0	22 November 2020	Taiwan Football Premier League	

=== Cleansheets ===
Rank	No.	Nat.	Player	TFPL	Total
1	21	(Chinese Taipei)	Tuan Yu	9	9
2	35	(Chinese Taipei)	Lee Ming-wei	3	3
3	1	(Japan)	Jun Kochi	1	1
4	37	(Japan)	Kenshin Katata	0	0
4	34	(Chinese Taipei)	Chen Jih-yang	—	0
4	36	(Chinese Taipei)	Tsai Chih-hsin	—	0
Totals				13	13

=== Disciplinary record ===
No.	Pos.	Nat.	Name	TFPL			Total		
No.	Pos.	Nat.	Name	Booked	(yellow card) (yellow-red card)	Sent off (straight red)	Booked	(yellow card) (yellow-red card)	Sent off (straight red)
5	DF	(Japan)	Yugo Ichiyanagi	5			5		
4	DF	(Chinese Taipei)	Hung Tzu-kuei	4		1	4		1
7	DF	(Japan)	Keisuke Ogawa	4			4		
3	DF	(Chinese Taipei)	Chen Ting-yang	3			3		
6	DF	(Chinese Taipei)	Chao Ming-hsiu	3			3		
9	FW	(Chinese Taipei)	Li Mao	3			3		
17	MF	(Chinese Taipei)	Hsu Heng-pin	2		1	2		1
21	GK	(Chinese Taipei)	Tuan Yu	2			2		
24	DF	(Japan)	Kohei Ueda	2			2		
88	MF	(Chinese Taipei)	Lin Chien-liang	2			2		
1	GK	(Japan)	Jun Kochi	1			1		
8	MF	(Japan)	Yoshitaka Komori	1			1		
15	FW	(South Korea)	Mun Te-su	1			1		
30	FW	(Chinese Taipei)	Chen Chi-wei	1			1		
Totals				34		2	34		2

Ordered by (red card) , (second yellow card) and (yellow card)
(yellow card) = Number of bookings; (second yellow card) = Number of sending offs after a second yellow card; (red card) = Number of sending offs by a direct red card.

== Awards ==
Player	Position	Award	Ref.
(Chinese Taipei) Tuan Yu	Goalkeeper	Golden Gloves	
