= 2021 Taichung Futuro season =

Taichung Futuro
2021 season
- Owner: Yoshitaka Komori
- Head coach: Vom Ca-nhum
- TFPL: 3rd
- Top goalscorer: League: Shohei Yokoyama (5); All: Shohei Yokoyama (5)
- Biggest win: Land Home NTUS 0–3 Taichung Futuro; Land Home NTUS 1–4 Taichung Futuro
- Biggest defeat: Tainan City TSG 3–1 Taichung Futuro

The 2021 Taichung Futuro season was the club's 3rd season and their 3rd season in Taiwan Football Premier League.

== Kits ==
- Supplier: MIE Jersey
- Main Sponsor: Lihpao Resort

== Players ==
| N | Pos. | Nat. | Name | Age. | Since |
Goalkeepers
| 1 | GK | (Chinese Taipei) | Tuan Hsuan | 24 | 2021 |
| 11 | GK | (Chinese Taipei) | Lee Ming-wei | 24 | 2020 |
| 21 | GK | (Chinese Taipei) | Tuan Yu | 27 | 2019 |
| 77 | GK | (Japan) | Kenshin Katata | 22 | 2020 |
| 81 | GK | (Japan) | Jun Kochi | 38 | 2020 |
Defenders
| 2 | DF | (Chinese Taipei) | Wang Ruei | 28 | 2020 |
| 3 | DF | (Chinese Taipei) | Chen Ting-yang (captain) | 29 | 2019 |
| 4 | DF | (Chinese Taipei) | Wu Meng-chi | 22 | 2020 |
| 6 | DF | (Senegal) | Massamba Sambou | 35 | 2021 |
| 7 | DF | (Japan) | Keisuke Ogawa | 35 | 2019 |
| 20 | DF | (Chinese Taipei) | Chiu Po-jui | 22 | 2021 |
| 23 | DF | (Chinese Taipei) | Juang Ming-yan | 32 | 2020 |
Midfielders
| 5 | MF | (Japan) | Naoyuki Yamazaki | 30 | 2021 |
| 8 | MF | (Chinese Taipei) | Yoshitaka Komori | 34 | 2019 |
| 9 | MF | (Chinese Taipei) | Chen Hung-wei | 24 | 2021 |
| 13 | MF | (Chinese Taipei) | Su Hung-chi | 27 | 2021 |
| 14 | MF | (Chinese Taipei) | Liao Yi-shih | 26 | 2019 |
| 16 | MF | (Chinese Taipei) | Jiang Hao-ren | 24 | 2020 |
| 17 | MF | (Chinese Taipei) | Hsu Heng-pin | 28 | 2019 |
| 19 | MF | (Japan) | Seiji Fujiwara | 45 | 2019 |
| 22 | MF | (Japan) | Shohei Yokoyama | 28 | 2021 |
| 38 | MF | (Chinese Taipei) | Tu Shao-chieh | 22 | 2021 |
| 43 | MF | (Chinese Taipei) | Liang Meng-hsin | 18 | 2021 |
| 66 | MF | (Chinese Taipei) | Zeng Zi-hao | 24 | 2021 |
| 88 | MF | (Chinese Taipei) | Lin Chien-liang | 27 | 2019 |
Forwards
| 10 | FW | (South Korea) | Joo Ik-seong | 29 | 2020 |
| 15 | FW | (Chinese Taipei) | Huang Sheng-chieh | 22 | 2021 |
| 18 | FW | (Chinese Taipei) | Li Mao | 29 | 2019 |
| 24 | FW | (Chinese Taipei) | Jhih-jie Men-nuo | 28 | 2021 |
| 26 | FW | (Chinese Taipei) | Li Chung-yun | 27 | 2019 |
| 27 | FW | (Chinese Taipei) | Chen Hao-wei | 29 | 2021 |
| 30 | FW | (Chinese Taipei) | Chen Chi-wei | 21 | 2020 |
| 87 | FW | (Chinese Taipei) | Onur Dogan | 34 | 2021 |
| 89 | FW | (South Korea) | Mun Te-su | 27 | 2020 |

== Transfers ==
=== In ===
| No. | Pos. | Player | Transferred from | Source |
Preseason
| 1 | GK | Tuan Hsuan | (Chinese Taipei) Tainan City TSG | |
| 5 | MF | Naoyuki Yamazaki | – | |
| 6 | DF | Massamba Sambou | (Mongolia) Ulaanbaatar City | |
| 9 | MF | Chen Hung-wei | – | |
| 13 | MF | Su Hung-chi | – | |
| 15 | FW | Huang Sheng-chieh | (Chinese Taipei) Ming Chuan University | |
| 20 | DF | Chiu Po-jui | (Chinese Taipei) Ming Chuan University | |
| 24 | FW | Jhih-jie Men-nuo | – | |
| 27 | FW | Chen Hao-wei | (Hong Kong) Eastern | |
| 33 | DF | Filip Engelman | (Serbia) OFK Beograd | |
| 87 | FW | Onur Dogan | (Chinese Taipei) Tatung | |
Midseason
| 22 | MF | Shohei Yokoyama | – | |
| 38 | MF | Tu Shao-chieh | (Chinese Taipei) Andy Chen Academy | |
| 43 | MF | Liang Meng-hsin | (Chinese Taipei) Hualien High School | |
| 66 | MF | Zeng Zi-hao | – | |

=== Out ===
| No. | Pos. | Player | Transferred to | Source |
Preseason
| 4 | DF | Hung Tzu-kuei | (Chinese Taipei) CPC Corporation | |
| 5 | DF | Yugo Ichiyanagi | – | |
| 6 | DF | Chao Ming-hsiu | (Chinese Taipei) Taipower | |
| 10 | MF | Keita Yamauchi | (Japan) Esperanza | |
| 18 | MF | Kuo Yao-hua | – | |
| 24 | DF | Kohei Ueda | (Japan) YSCC Yokohama | |
| 31 | DF | Li Yi-ming | – | |
| 32 | MF | Calum Togneri | – | |
| 34 | GK | Chen Jih-yang | – | |
| 36 | GK | Tsai Chih-hsin | (Chinese Taipei) Inter Taoyuan | |
| 38 | MF | Tsai Hsien-chieh | (Chinese Taipei) Kaohsiung | |
Midseason
| 33 | DF | Filip Engelman | – | |

== Preseason and friendlies ==
| 28 February 2021 Friendly | Chinese Taipei | 1–1 | Taichung Futuro | New Taipei |
| | | | | Stadium: Fu Jen Catholic University |

== Competitions ==
=== Overall record ===
| Competition | First match | Last match | Starting round | Final position | Record | | | | | | | |
| Competition | First match | Last match | Starting round | Final position | Pld | W | D | L | GF | GA | GD | Win % |
|---|---|---|---|---|---|---|---|---|---|---|---|---|
| TFPL | 11 April 2021 | 19 December 2021 | Matchday 1 | 3rd | 14 | 8 | 2 | 4 | 20 | 11 | +9 | 57.14 |
| Total | | | | | 14 | 8 | 2 | 4 | 20 | 11 | +9 | 57.14 |

Source: TFPL

=== Taiwan Football Premier League ===
==== League table ====
| Pos | Team | Pld | W | D | L | GF | GA | GD | Pts | Qualification or relegation |
|---|---|---|---|---|---|---|---|---|---|---|
| 1 | Tainan City TSG (C) | 14 | 11 | 1 | 2 | 40 | 12 | +28 | 34 | Qualification for the AFC Cup group stage |
| 2 | Taipower | 14 | 9 | 4 | 1 | 25 | 6 | +19 | 31 | |
| 3 | Taichung Futuro | 14 | 8 | 2 | 4 | 20 | 11 | +9 | 26 | |
| 4 | Hang Yuen | 14 | 7 | 4 | 3 | 19 | 13 | +6 | 25 | |
| 5 | Tatung | 14 | 5 | 3 | 6 | 20 | 22 | −2 | 18 | |
| 6 | CPC Corporation | 14 | 4 | 2 | 8 | 18 | 24 | −6 | 14 | |
| 7 | Taipei Flight Skywalkers (R) | 14 | 1 | 2 | 11 | 2 | 23 | −21 | 5 | Transfer to 2022 Taiwan Football Premier League qualifiers |
| 8 | Land Home NTUS (R) | 14 | 1 | 2 | 11 | 8 | 41 | −33 | 5 | Relegation to Taiwan Second Division Football League |

(C) Champions; (R) Relegated

==== Results by round ====
| Round | 1 | 2 | 3 | 4 | 5 | 6 | 7 | 8 | 9 | 10 | 11 | 12 | 13 | 14 |
|---|---|---|---|---|---|---|---|---|---|---|---|---|---|---|
| Result | W | L | L | W | D | W | D | W | L | W | W | L | W | W |
| Position | 2 | 4 | 6 | 3 | 4 | 3 | 4 | 4 | 5 | 3 | 3 | 4 | 3 | 3 |

Source: TFPL
W = Win; D = Draw; L = Loss

==== Matches ====
| 11 April 2021 1 | CPC Corporation | 0–1 | Taichung Futuro | Kaohsiung |
| 18:30 (UTC+8) | Hsiao Cheng-hung (yellow card) 61'; Ling Wen-jui (yellow card) 70' | Recap | Ogawa (yellow card) 18' (yellow-red card) 42'; Yamazaki 36' | Stadium: National Stadium; Attendance: 500; Referee: Kuo Chan-yu |

| 14 April 2021 2 | Taichung Futuro | 0–1 | Tainan City TSG | Hsinchu County |
| 19:00 (UTC+8) | Engelman (yellow card) 48'; Li Mao (yellow card) 82' | Recap | Kouamé 63' | Stadium: National Taiwan University Zhubei Campus; Attendance: 22; Referee: Chen Hsin-chuan |

| 18 April 2021 3 | Hang Yuan | 1–0 | Taichung Futuro | New Taipei |
| 16:00 (UTC+8) | Hsu Yi 17'; Liu Chia-ming (yellow card) 53' | Recap | | Stadium: Fu Jen Catholic University; Attendance: 100; Referee: Kuo Chia-hao |

| 21 April 2021 4 | Taipei Flight Skywalkers | 0–1 | Taichung Futuro | Hsinchu County |
| 19:00 (UTC+8) | Cheng Chih-huan (yellow card) 45' | Recap | Dogan 40'; Ogawa (yellow card) 44' | Stadium: National Taiwan University Zhubei Campus; Attendance: 29; Referee: Chen Hsin-chuan |

| 25 April 2021 5 | Taipower | 1–1 | Taichung Futuro | Hsinchu County |
| 16:00 (UTC+8) | Lin Cheng-yi (yellow card) 71'; Lin Chien-hsun 79' (pen.) | Recap | Tuan Hsuan (yellow card) 77'; Dogan (yellow card) 87'; Chen Ting-yang 88' | Stadium: Hsinchu County Second Stadium; Attendance: 99; Referee: Yu Ming-hsun |

| 28 April 2021 6 | Land Home NTUS | 0–3 | Taichung Futuro | Hsinchu County |
| 16:00 (UTC+8) | Yang Ying-qun (yellow card) 80' | Recap | Dogan 17' (yellow card) 85'; Yamazaki 26'; Ogawa (yellow card) 44'; Joo Ik-seong 90+1' | Stadium: National Taiwan University Zhubei Campus; Attendance: 13; Referee: Kuo Chia-hao |

| 2 May 2021 7 | Taichung Futuro | 0–0 | Tatung | Hsinchu County |
| 16:30 (UTC+8) | Wu Meng-chi (yellow card) 88' | Recap | Huang Jyun-wun (yellow card) 65'; Harada (yellow card) 90+1' | Stadium: Hsinchu County Second Stadium; Attendance: 403; Referee: Chen Hsin-chuan |

| 5 May 2021 8 | CPC Corporation | 1–2 | Taichung Futuro | Kaohsiung |
| 16:00 (UTC+8) | Nuriev (yellow card) 27' (goal) 31'; Hung Tzu-kuei (yellow card) 36'; Cheng Chun-hsien (yellow card) 53'; Tsai Shuo-che (yellow card) 90+5' | Recap | Sambou 48'; Yamazaki 82'; Lin Chien-liang (yellow card) 88' | Stadium: National Stadium; Referee: Chen Hsin-chuan |

| 21 November 2021 9 | Tainan City TSG | 3–1 | Taichung Futuro | Kaohsiung |
| 16:00 (UTC+8) | Cheng Hao (yellow card) 31'; Yu Chia-huang 45+1'; Zumakulov 62'; Chen Jui-chieh 78' | Recap | Yamazaki 50'; Komori (yellow card) 71' | Stadium: National Stadium; Attendance: 92; Referee: Kuo Po-hung |

| 28 November 2021 10 | Hang Yuan | 0–1 | Taichung Futuro | New Taipei |
| 16:00 (UTC+8) | Liu Chia-ming (yellow card) 55'; Shimono (yellow card) 90+5' | Recap | Li Mao (yellow card) 70'; Joo Ik-seong (yellow card) 81' (goal) 84' | Stadium: Fu Jen Catholic University; Attendance: 92; Referee: Kuo Chia-hao |

| 1 December 2021 11 | Taichung Futuro | 2–0 | Taipei Flight Skywalkers | Hsinchu County |
| 18:00 (UTC+8) | Tu Shao-chieh (yellow card) 45+2'; Li Mao 55'; Sambou (yellow card) 65'; Chiu Po-jui 77' | Recap | | Stadium: National Taiwan University Zhubei Campus; Attendance: 26; Referee: Liu Hsiang-shao |

| 5 December 2021 12 | Taichung Futuro | 1–2 | Taipower | Hsinchu County |
| 16:00 (UTC+8) | Wang Ruei (yellow card) 88'; Huang Sheng-chieh 90+2' | Recap | Ko Yu-ting 41'; Lin Chien-hsun 85' (yellow card) 90+8'; Chiu I-huan (yellow card) 90'; Tseng Chih-wei (yellow card) 90+2' | Stadium: National Taiwan University Zhubei Campus; Attendance: 41; Referee: Kuo Chia-hao |

| 12 December 2021 13 | Land Home NTUS | 1–4 | Taichung Futuro | Taichung |
| 15:00 (UTC+8) | Chen Po-hsun 22'; Tseng Yun-hao (yellow card) 30'; Huang Tzu-ming (yellow card) 43' | Recap | Yokoyama 9', 45+2' (pen.), 64'; Chen Hao-wei 61' | Stadium: Taiyuan Football Field; Attendance: 140; Referee: Zhuang En-yi |

| 19 December 2021 14 | Tatung | 1–3 | Taichung Futuro | Hsinchu County |
| 15:00 (UTC+8) | Lee Pin-hsien (yellow card) 16'; Ouédraogo 17' | Recap | Chen Hung-wei 7'; Yokoyama (yellow card) 40' (goal) 48', 60'; Sambou (yellow card) 85' | Stadium: National Taiwan University Zhubei Campus; Referee: Liu Hsiang-shao |

== Statistics ==
=== Squad statistics ===
| No. | Pos | Nat | Player | Total | | TMFL | |
| No. | Pos | Nat | Player | Apps | Goals | Apps | Goals |
Goalkeepers
| 1 | GK | (Chinese Taipei) TPE | Tuan Hsuan | 10 | 0 | 10 | 0 |
| 11 | GK | (Chinese Taipei) TPE | Lee Ming-wei | 0 | 0 | 0 | 0 |
| 21 | GK | (Chinese Taipei) TPE | Tuan Yu | 1 | 0 | 1 | 0 |
| 77 | GK | (Japan) JPN | Kenshin Katata | 0 | 0 | 0 | 0 |
| 81 | GK | (Japan) JPN | Jun Kochi | 3 | 0 | 3 | 0 |
Defenders
| 2 | DF | (Chinese Taipei) TPE | Wang Ruei | 1 | 0 | 0+1 | 0 |
| 3 | DF | (Chinese Taipei) TPE | Chen Ting-yang | 14 | 1 | 14 | 1 |
| 4 | DF | (Chinese Taipei) TPE | Wu Meng-chi | 4 | 0 | 2+2 | 0 |
| 6 | DF | (Senegal) SEN | Massamba Sambou | 8 | 1 | 8 | 1 |
| 7 | DF | (Japan) JPN | Keisuke Ogawa | 7 | 0 | 6+1 | 0 |
| 20 | DF | (Chinese Taipei) TPE | Chiu Po-jui | 11 | 1 | 8+3 | 1 |
| 23 | DF | (Chinese Taipei) TPE | Juang Ming-yan | 0 | 0 | 0 | 0 |
Midfielders
| 5 | MF | (Japan) JPN | Naoyuki Yamazaki | 14 | 4 | 13+1 | 4 |
| 8 | MF | (Chinese Taipei) TPE | Yoshitaka Komori | 14 | 0 | 14 | 0 |
| 9 | MF | (Chinese Taipei) TPE | Chen Hung-wei | 12 | 1 | 7+5 | 1 |
| 13 | MF | (Chinese Taipei) TPE | Su Hung-chi | 0 | 0 | 0 | 0 |
| 14 | MF | (Chinese Taipei) TPE | Liao Yi-shih | 0 | 0 | 0 | 0 |
| 16 | MF | (Chinese Taipei) TPE | Jiang Hao-ren | 11 | 0 | 10+1 | 0 |
| 17 | MF | (Chinese Taipei) TPE | Hsu Heng-pin | 12 | 0 | 9+3 | 0 |
| 19 | MF | (Japan) JPN | Seiji Fujiwara | 0 | 0 | 0 | 0 |
| 22 | MF | (Japan) JPN | Shohei Yokoyama | 2 | 5 | 2 | 5 |
| 38 | MF | (Chinese Taipei) TPE | Tu Shao-chieh | 6 | 0 | 6 | 0 |
| 43 | MF | (Chinese Taipei) TPE | Liang Meng-hsin | 5 | 0 | 5 | 0 |
| 66 | MF | (Chinese Taipei) TPE | Zeng Zi-hao | 0 | 0 | 0 | 0 |
| 88 | MF | (Chinese Taipei) TPE | Lin Chien-liang | 3 | 0 | 1+2 | 0 |
Forwards
| 10 | FW | (South Korea) KOR | Joo Ik-seong | 12 | 2 | 6+6 | 2 |
| 15 | FW | (Chinese Taipei) TPE | Huang Sheng-chieh | 5 | 1 | 1+4 | 1 |
| 18 | FW | (Chinese Taipei) TPE | Li Mao | 8 | 1 | 6+2 | 1 |
| 24 | FW | (Chinese Taipei) TPE | Jhih-jie Men-nuo | 0 | 0 | 0 | 0 |
| 26 | FW | (Chinese Taipei) TPE | Li Chung-yun | 2 | 0 | 0+2 | 0 |
| 27 | FW | (Chinese Taipei) TPE | Chen Hao-wei | 12 | 1 | 7+5 | 1 |
| 30 | FW | (Chinese Taipei) TPE | Chen Chi-wei | 0 | 0 | 0 | 0 |
| 87 | FW | (Chinese Taipei) TPE | Onur Dogan | 12 | 2 | 11+1 | 2 |
| 89 | FW | (South Korea) KOR | Mun Te-su | 4 | 0 | 0+4 | 0 |
Players who left during the season but made an appearance
| 33 | DF | (Serbia) SRB | Filip Engelman | 5 | 0 | 4+1 | 0 |
Own goals (0)

=== Goalscorers ===
| Rank | No. | Pos. | Nat. | Player | TMFL | Total |
|---|---|---|---|---|---|---|
| 1 | 22 | MF | (Japan) | Shohei Yokoyama | 5 | 5 |
| 2 | 5 | MF | (Japan) | Naoyuki Yamazaki | 4 | 4 |
| 3 | 10 | FW | (South Korea) | Joo Ik-seong | 2 | 2 |
| 3 | 87 | FW | (Chinese Taipei) | Onur Dogan | 2 | 2 |
| 5 | 3 | DF | (Chinese Taipei) | Chen Ting-yang | 1 | 1 |
| 5 | 6 | DF | (Senegal) | Massamba Sambou | 1 | 1 |
| 5 | 9 | MF | (Chinese Taipei) | Chen Hung-wei | 1 | 1 |
| 5 | 15 | FW | (Chinese Taipei) | Huang Sheng-chieh | 1 | 1 |
| 5 | 18 | FW | (Chinese Taipei) | Li Mao | 1 | 1 |
| 5 | 20 | DF | (Chinese Taipei) | Chiu Po-jui | 1 | 1 |
| 5 | 27 | FW | (Chinese Taipei) | Chen Hao-wei | 1 | 1 |
| Own goals (from the opponents) | | | | | 0 | 0 |
| Totals | | | | | 20 | 20 |

=== Hat-tricks ===
| Player | Against | Result | Date | Competition | Ref |
|---|---|---|---|---|---|
| (Japan) Shohei Yokoyama | Land Home NTUS | 4–1 | 12 December 2021 | Taiwan Football Premier League | |

=== Cleansheets ===
| Rank | No. | Nat. | Player | TFPL | Total |
|---|---|---|---|---|---|
| 1 | 1 | (Chinese Taipei) | Tuan Hsuan | 4 | 4 |
| 2 | 81 | (Japan) | Jun Kochi | 2 | 2 |
| 3 | 21 | (Chinese Taipei) | Tuan Yu | 0 | 0 |
| 3 | 11 | (Chinese Taipei) | Lee Ming-wei | — | 0 |
| 3 | 77 | (Japan) | Kenshin Katata | — | 0 |
| Totals | | | | 6 | 6 |

=== Disciplinary record ===
| No. | Pos. | Nat. | Name | TFPL | | | Total | | |
| No. | Pos. | Nat. | Name | Booked | (yellow card) (yellow-red card) | Sent off (straight red) | Booked | (yellow card) (yellow-red card) | Sent off (straight red) |
|---|---|---|---|---|---|---|---|---|---|
| 6 | DF | (Senegal) | Massamba Sambou | 2 | | | 2 | | |
| 8 | MF | (Chinese Taipei) | Yoshitaka Komori | 2 | | | 2 | | |
| 18 | FW | (Chinese Taipei) | Li Mao | 2 | | | 2 | | |
| 87 | FW | (Chinese Taipei) | Onur Dogan | 2 | | | 2 | | |
| 7 | DF | (Japan) | Keisuke Ogawa | 1 | 1 | | 1 | 1 | |
| 1 | GK | (Chinese Taipei) | Tuan Hsuan | 1 | | | 1 | | |
| 2 | DF | (Chinese Taipei) | Wang Ruei | 1 | | | 1 | | |
| 4 | DF | (Chinese Taipei) | Wu Meng-chi | 1 | | | 1 | | |
| 10 | FW | (South Korea) | Joo Ik-seong | 1 | | | 1 | | |
| 22 | MF | (Japan) | Shohei Yokoyama | 1 | | | 1 | | |
| 33 | DF | (Serbia) | Filip Engelman | 1 | | | 1 | | |
| 38 | MF | (Chinese Taipei) | Tu Shao-chieh | 1 | | | 1 | | |
| 88 | MF | (Chinese Taipei) | Lin Chien-liang | 1 | | | 1 | | |
| Totals | | | | 17 | 1 | | 17 | 1 | |

Ordered by (red card) , (second yellow card) and (yellow card)
(yellow card) = Number of bookings; (second yellow card) = Number of sending offs after a second yellow card; (red card) = Number of sending offs by a direct red card.
