= 2022 Taichung Futuro season =

Taichung Futuro
2022 season
- Owner: Yoshitaka Komori
- Head coach: Vom Ca-nhum
- TFPL: 2nd
- Top goalscorer: League: Benchy Estama (18); All: Benchy Estama (18)
- Biggest win: AC Taipei 1–5 Taichung Futuro; Taichung Futuro 4–0 Ming Chuan University; Hang Yuan 1–5 Taichung Futuro
- Biggest defeat: Tainan City TSG 1–0 Taichung Futuro

The 2022 Taichung Futuro season was the club's 4th season and their 4th season in Taiwan Football Premier League.

== Kits ==
- Supplier: MIE Jersey
- Main Sponsor: Lihpao Resort

== Players ==
| N | Pos. | Nat. | Name | Age. | Since |
Goalkeepers
| 1 | GK | (Chinese Taipei) | Pan Wen-chieh | 30 | 2022 |
| 21 | GK | (Chinese Taipei) | Tuan Yu | 28 | 2019 |
| 62 | GK | (Chinese Taipei) | Lee Ming-wei | 25 | 2020 |
| 81 | GK | (Japan) | Jun Kochi | 39 | 2020 |
Defenders
| 2 | DF | (Japan) | Takeo Miyazaki | 26 | 2022 |
| 3 | DF | (Chinese Taipei) | Chen Ting-yang (captain) | 30 | 2019 |
| 4 | DF | (Chinese Taipei) | Wang Ruei | 29 | 2020 |
| 5 | DF | (Chinese Taipei) | Cheng Hao | 25 | 2022 |
| 7 | DF | (Japan) | Keisuke Ogawa | 36 | 2019 |
| 23 | DF | (Chinese Taipei) | Juang Ming-yan | 33 | 2020 |
Midfielders
| 6 | MF | (Chinese Taipei) | Tu Shao-chieh | 23 | 2021 |
| 8 | MF | (Chinese Taipei) | Yoshitaka Komori | 35 | 2019 |
| 9 | MF | (Chinese Taipei) | Chen Hung-wei | 25 | 2021 |
| 11 | MF | (Chinese Taipei) | Wu Chun-ching | 33 | 2022 |
| 13 | MF | (Japan) | Koki Narita | 28 | 2022 |
| 17 | MF | (Chinese Taipei) | Hsu Heng-pin | 29 | 2019 |
| 19 | MF | (Japan) | Seiji Fujiwara | 46 | 2019 |
| 20 | MF | (Chile) | Matias Godoy | 28 | 2022 |
| 22 | MF | (Japan) | Shohei Yokoyama | 29 | 2021 |
| 43 | MF | (Chinese Taipei) | Liang Meng-hsin | 19 | 2021 |
Forwards
| 10 | FW | (Chinese Taipei) | Chen Hao-wei | 30 | 2021 |
| 15 | FW | (Japan) | Takayuki Morimoto | 34 | 2022 |
| 18 | FW | (Chinese Taipei) | Li Mao | 30 | 2019 |
| 26 | FW | (Japan) | Amari Oki | 22 | 2022 |
| 77 | FW | (Chinese Taipei) | Onur Dogan | 35 | 2021 |
| 80 | FW | (Chinese Taipei) | Chen Sheng-wei | 27 | 2022 |
| 99 | FW | (Haiti) | Benchy Estama | 28 | 2022 |

== Transfers ==
=== In ===
| No. | Pos. | Player | Transferred from | Source |
Preseason
| 1 | GK | Pan Wen-chieh | (Chinese Taipei) Tainan City | |
| 2 | DF | Takeo Miyazaki | (Cambodia) Soltilo Angkor | |
| 5 | DF | Cheng Hao | (Chinese Taipei) Tainan City | |
| 11 | MF | Wu Chun-ching | (Chinese Taipei) Tainan City | |
| 13 | MF | Koki Narita | (Thailand) Khon Kaen | |
| 80 | FW | Chen Sheng-wei | (Chinese Taipei) Inter Taoyuan | |
| 99 | FW | Benchy Estama | (Chinese Taipei) Tainan City | |
Midseason
| 15 | FW | Takayuki Morimoto | – | |
| 20 | MF | Matias Godoy | (Chinese Taipei) CPC Corporation | |
| 26 | FW | Amari Oki | – | |

=== Out ===
| No. | Pos. | Player | Transferred to | Source |
Preseason
| 1 | GK | Tuan Hsuan | (Chinese Taipei) Tainan City | |
| 4 | DF | Wu Meng-chi | (Chinese Taipei) AC Taipei | |
| 5 | MF | Naoyuki Yamazaki | (Chinese Taipei) Leopard Cat | |
| 6 | DF | Massamba Sambou | – | |
| 10 | FW | Joo Ik-seong | (Chinese Taipei) Hang Yuen | |
| 13 | MF | Su Hung-chi | – | |
| 14 | MF | Liao Yi-shih | – | |
| 15 | FW | Huang Sheng-chieh | (Chinese Taipei) AC Taipei | |
| 16 | MF | Jiang Hao-ren | – | |
| 20 | DF | Chiu Po-jui | (Chinese Taipei) Taipower | |
| 24 | FW | Jhih-jie Men-nuo | – | |
| 26 | FW | Li Chung-yun | – | |
| 30 | FW | Chen Chi-wei | – | |
| 66 | MF | Zeng Zi-hao | – | |
| 77 | GK | Kenshin Katata | (Chinese Taipei) AC Taipei | |
| 88 | MF | Lin Chien-liang | – | |
| 89 | FW | Mun Te-su | – | |

== Preseason and friendlies ==
| 4 April 2022 Friendly | Taichung Futuro | 7–0 | Taichung City | Taichung |
| | | Report | | Stadium: Taiyuan Football Field |

== Competitions ==
=== Overall record ===
| Competition | First match | Last match | Starting round | Final position | Record | | | | | | | |
| Competition | First match | Last match | Starting round | Final position | Pld | W | D | L | GF | GA | GD | Win % |
|---|---|---|---|---|---|---|---|---|---|---|---|---|
| TFPL | 17 April 2022 | 27 November 2022 | Matchday 1 | 2nd | 18 | 10 | 7 | 1 | 36 | 11 | +25 | 55.56 |
| Total | | | | | 18 | 10 | 7 | 1 | 36 | 11 | +25 | 55.56 |

Source: TFPL

=== Taiwan Football Premier League ===
==== League table ====
| Pos | Team | Pld | W | D | L | GF | GA | GD | Pts | Qualification or relegation |
|---|---|---|---|---|---|---|---|---|---|---|
| 1 | Tainan City TSG (C) | 18 | 11 | 5 | 2 | 47 | 19 | +28 | 38 | Qualification for the AFC Cup group stage |
| 2 | Taichung Futuro | 18 | 10 | 7 | 1 | 36 | 11 | +25 | 37 | Qualification for the AFC Cup qualifying play-offs |
| 3 | Taipower | 18 | 8 | 7 | 3 | 25 | 18 | +7 | 31 | |
| 4 | Hang Yuen | 18 | 8 | 5 | 5 | 37 | 30 | +7 | 29 | |
| 5 | Leopard Cat | 18 | 6 | 6 | 6 | 23 | 26 | −3 | 24 | |
| 6 | AC Taipei | 18 | 1 | 4 | 13 | 21 | 51 | −30 | 7 | |
| 7 | Ming Chuan University | 18 | 1 | 2 | 15 | 11 | 45 | −34 | 5 | Transfer to 2023 Taiwan Football Premier League qualifiers |

(C) Champions

==== Results by round ====
| Round | 1 | 2 | 3 | 4 | 5 | 6 | 7 | 8 | 9 | 10 | 11 | 12 | 13 | 14 | 15 | 16 | 17 | 18 | 19 | 20 | 21 |
|---|---|---|---|---|---|---|---|---|---|---|---|---|---|---|---|---|---|---|---|---|---|
| Result | D | D | W | W | X | D | D | W | D | D | W | X | W | W | W | D | W | W | X | L | W |
| Position | 3 | 5 | 3 | 2 | 2 | 2 | 4 | 3 | 1 | 1 | 1 | 1 | 1 | 1 | 1 | 1 | 1 | 1 | 1 | 2 | 2 |

Source: TFPL
W = Win; D = Draw; L = Loss; X = No match in this matchday

==== Matches ====
| 17 April 2022 1 | Taichung Futuro | 1–1 | Leopard Cat | Kaohsiung |
| 19:00 (UTC+8) | Ogawa (yellow card) 26'; Yokoyama 38'; Komori (yellow card) 56' | Recap | Lin Chih-hsuan (yellow card) 9'; Huang Chu-hsuan (yellow card) 31'; Lan Hao-yu (yellow card) 44'; Wei Pei-lun 51'; Chen Yen-jui (yellow card) 89' | Stadium: National Stadium; Attendance: 149; Referee: Kuo Chan-yu |

| 24 April 2022 2 | Taipower | 0–0 | Taichung Futuro | New Taipei |
| 15:00 (UTC+8) | | Recap | | Stadium: Fu Jen Catholic University; Attendance: 56; Referee: Yu Ming-hsun |

| 1 May 2022 3 | AC Taipei | 1–5 | Taichung Futuro | Taoyuan |
| 16:00 (UTC+8) | Wu Lung-ming 56' | Recap | Li Mao 1'; Estama 25', 43', 90+2' (pen.); Hsu Heng-pin 88' | Stadium: Ming Chuan University; Attendance: 42; Referee: Lee Tsung-ying |

| 8 May 2022 4 | Taichung Futuro | 4–0 | Ming Chuan University | Kaohsiung |
| 16:00 (UTC+8) | Dogan 29'; Yokoyama 57'; Hsieh Peng-lung 70' (o.g.); Estama 72' | Recap | | Stadium: National Stadium; Attendance: 64; Referee: Kuo Chan-yu |

| 22 May 2022 6 | Taichung Futuro | 0–0 | Tainan City TSG | Taichung |
| 16:00 (UTC+8) | Chen Ting-yang (yellow card) 34'; Komori (yellow card) 45+1' | Recap | | Stadium: Taiyuan Football Field; Attendance: 168; Referee: Hsu Min-yu |

| 26 June 2022 7 | Hang Yuen | 0–0 | Taichung Futuro | New Taipei |
| 16:00 (UTC+8) | Judelin Aveska (yellow card) 87' | Recap | | Stadium: Fu Jen Catholic University; Attendance: 196; Referee: Chen Hsin-chuan |

| 17 July 2022 8 | Taichung Futuro | 3–0 | Leopard Cat | Taichung |
| 15:00 (UTC+8) | Ogawa 44'; Estama 90' (pen.), 90+7' | Recap | Huang Chu-hsuan (yellow card) 90+1'; Harada (yellow card) 90+1' | Stadium: Taiyuan Football Field; Attendance: 217; Referee: Kuo Chan-yu |

| 24 July 2022 10 | Taichung Futuro | 3–3 | AC Taipei | Taichung |
| 19:00 (UTC+8) | Estama 18', 38' (pen.); Chen Ting-yang 62' | Recap | Lee Tsung-yang 8'; Wu Pei-hsi 42'; Huang Sheng-chieh 81' | Stadium: Taiyuan Football Field; Attendance: 127; Referee: Yu Ming-hsun |

| 31 July 2022 11 | Ming Chuan University | 0–1 | Taichung Futuro | Taoyuan |
| 18:00 (UTC+8) | | Recap | Estama 82' (pen.); Tu Shao-chieh (yellow card) 86' | Stadium: Ming Chuan University; Attendance: 27; Referee: Chen Hsin-chuan |

| 7 August 2022 13 | Tainan City TSG | 0–3 | Taichung Futuro | Tainan |
| 16:00 (UTC+8) | Pai Shao-yu (yellow card) 21' (yellow-red card) 39'; Chen Wei-chuan (yellow card) 29'; Zumakulov (yellow card) 34'; Chen Wei-jen (yellow card) 39'; Traore (yellow card) 73' | Recap | Dogan 7'; Miyazaki 21'; Estama 32'; Kochi (red card) 39'; Tu Shao-chieh (yellow card) 90+1' | Stadium: Siao-Long Football Stadium; Attendance: 75; Referee: Yu Ming-hsun |

| 14 August 2022 14 | Taichung Futuro | 4–2 | Hang Yuen | Taichung |
| 16:00 (UTC+8) | Dogan 19'; Tu Shao-chieh (yellow card) 39'; Wu Chun-ching (yellow card) 49'; Cheng Hao (yellow card) 66'; Estama 71'; Narita 88' (pen.); Chen Hao-wei 90+6' | Recap | Wu Yen-shu 68'; Joo Ik-seong 86' | Stadium: Taituan Football Field; Attendance: 204; Referee: Kuo Chia-hao |

| 21 August 2022 9 | Taichung Futuro | 0–0 | Taipower | Kaohsiung |
| 16:00 (UTC+8) | Chen Ting-yang (yellow card) 42'; Miyazaki (yellow card) 45'; Wu Chun-ching (yellow card) 89' | Recap | Lin Cheng-yi (yellow card) 90+3' | Stadium: National Stadium; Attendance: 405; Referee: Kuo Chan-yu |

| 19 October 2022 15 | Leopard Cat | 1–2 | Taichung Futuro | Taoyuan |
| 18:30 (UTC+8) | Rabre (yellow card) 42'; Fukasawa (yellow card) 45'; Wei Pei-lun 56' | Recap | Estama 13' (pen.); Chen Hao-wei 40'; Wu Chun-ching (yellow card) 45+3' | Stadium: Ming Chuan University; Attendance: 105; Referee: Yu Ming-hsun |

| 23 October 2022 16 | Taipower | 0–0 | Taichung Futuro | Kaohsiung |
| : (UTC+8) | Lin Cheng-yi (yellow card) 70'; Lin Chien-hsun (yellow card) 90+3' | Recap | Li Mao (yellow card) 40'; Cheng Hao (yellow card) 46'; Estama (yellow card) 80' | Stadium: National Stadium; Referee: Kuo Chan-yu |

| 30 October 2022 17 | AC Taipei | 1–2 | Taichung Futuro | Taoyuan |
| 16:00 (UTC+8) | Huang Wei-jie 8' | Recap | Estama 14', 51' | Stadium: Ming Chuan University; Referee: Ko Chuan-yao |

| 6 November 2022 18 | Ming Chuan University | 0–3 | Taichung Futuro | Taoyuan |
| 18:00 (UTC+8) | | Recap | Estama 14', 45'; Narita 31'; Godoy (yellow card) 77' | Stadium: Ming Chuan University; Referee: Kuo Chia-hao |

| 20 November 2022 20 | Tainan City TSG | 1–0 | Taichung Futuro | Tainan |
| 15:00 (UTC+8) | Ahn Byung-keon (yellow card) 33'; Pan Wen-chieh 60' (o.g.); Tsai Shuo-che (yellow card) 71' | Recap | | Stadium: Tainan Municipal Football Field; Referee: Yang Shu-ting |

| 27 November 2022 21 | Hang Yuan | 1–5 | Taichung Futuro | New Taipei |
| 15:00 (UTC+8) | Yang Chia-pao (yellow card) 30'; Ando (yellow card) 70'; Pan Yen-hung 78' | Recap | Morimoto (yellow card) 17'; Chen Ting-yang (yellow card) 27'; Li Mao 31' (yellow card) 70'; Estama 34', 64'; Yang Chia-pao 51' (o.g.); Tu Shao-chieh (yellow card) 67'; Yokoyama 72' | Stadium: Fu Jen Catholic University; Referee: Yu Ming-hsun |

== Statistics ==
=== Squad statistics ===
| No. | Pos | Nat | Player | Total | | TMFL | |
| No. | Pos | Nat | Player | Apps | Goals | Apps | Goals |
Goalkeepers
| 1 | GK | (Chinese Taipei) TPE | Pan Wen-chieh | 18 | 0 | 18 | 0 |
| 21 | GK | (Chinese Taipei) TPE | Tuan Yu | 2 | 0 | 0+2 | 0 |
| 62 | GK | (Chinese Taipei) TPE | Lee Ming-wei | 0 | 0 | 0 | 0 |
| 81 | GK | (Japan) JPN | Jun Kochi | 0 | 0 | 0 | 0 |
Defenders
| 2 | DF | (Japan) JPN | Takeo Miyazaki | 16 | 1 | 13+3 | 1 |
| 3 | DF | (Chinese Taipei) TPE | Chen Ting-yang | 17 | 1 | 17 | 1 |
| 4 | DF | (Chinese Taipei) TPE | Wang Ruei | 8 | 0 | 5+3 | 0 |
| 5 | DF | (Chinese Taipei) TPE | Cheng Hao | 12 | 0 | 7+5 | 0 |
| 7 | DF | (Japan) JPN | Keisuke Ogawa | 17 | 1 | 16+1 | 1 |
| 23 | DF | (Chinese Taipei) TPE | Juang Ming-yan | 0 | 0 | 0 | 0 |
Midfielders
| 6 | MF | (Chinese Taipei) TPE | Tu Shao-chieh | 16 | 0 | 11+5 | 0 |
| 8 | MF | (Chinese Taipei) TPE | Yoshitaka Komori | 11 | 0 | 6+5 | 0 |
| 9 | MF | (Chinese Taipei) TPE | Chen Hung-wei | 5 | 0 | 0+5 | 0 |
| 11 | MF | (Chinese Taipei) TPE | Wu Chun-ching | 17 | 0 | 17 | 0 |
| 13 | MF | (Japan) JPN | Koki Narita | 15 | 2 | 7+8 | 2 |
| 17 | MF | (Chinese Taipei) TPE | Hsu Heng-pin | 8 | 1 | 1+7 | 1 |
| 19 | MF | (Japan) JPN | Seiji Fujiwara | 1 | 0 | 0+1 | 0 |
| 20 | MF | (Chile) CHI | Matias Godoy | 2 | 0 | 0+2 | 0 |
| 22 | MF | (Japan) JPN | Shohei Yokoyama | 16 | 3 | 13+3 | 3 |
| 43 | MF | (Chinese Taipei) TPE | Liang Meng-hsin | 16 | 0 | 14+2 | 0 |
Forwards
| 10 | FW | (Chinese Taipei) TPE | Chen Hao-wei | 17 | 2 | 10+7 | 2 |
| 15 | FW | (Japan) JPN | Takayuki Morimoto | 6 | 0 | 3+3 | 0 |
| 18 | FW | (Chinese Taipei) TPE | Li Mao | 16 | 2 | 16 | 2 |
| 26 | FW | (Japan) JPN | Amari Oki | 1 | 0 | 0+1 | 0 |
| 77 | FW | (Chinese Taipei) TPE | Onur Dogan | 16 | 3 | 6+10 | 3 |
| 80 | FW | (Chinese Taipei) TPE | Chen Sheng-wei | 2 | 0 | 0+2 | 0 |
| 99 | FW | (Haiti) HAI | Benchy Estama | 18 | 18 | 18 | 18 |
Own goals (1)

=== Goalscorers ===
| Rank | No. | Pos. | Nat. | Player | TMFL | Total |
|---|---|---|---|---|---|---|
| 1 | 99 | FW | (Haiti) | Benchy Estama | 18 | 18 |
| 2 | 22 | MF | (Japan) | Shohei Yokoyama | 3 | 3 |
| 2 | 77 | FW | (Chinese Taipei) | Onur Dogan | 3 | 3 |
| 4 | 10 | FW | (Chinese Taipei) | Chen Hao-wei | 2 | 2 |
| 4 | 13 | MF | (Japan) | Koki Narita | 2 | 2 |
| 4 | 18 | FW | (Chinese Taipei) | Li Mao | 2 | 2 |
| 7 | 2 | DF | (Japan) | Takeo Miyazaki | 1 | 1 |
| 7 | 3 | DF | (Chinese Taipei) | Chen Ting-yang | 1 | 1 |
| 7 | 7 | DF | (Japan) | Keisuke Ogawa | 1 | 1 |
| 7 | 17 | MF | (Chinese Taipei) | Hsu Heng-pin | 1 | 1 |
| Own goals (from the opponents) | | | | | 2 | 2 |
| Totals | | | | | 36 | 36 |

=== Hat-tricks ===
| Player | Against | Result | Date | Competition | Ref |
|---|---|---|---|---|---|
| (Haiti) Benchy Estama | AC Taipei | 5–1 | 1 May 2022 | Taiwan Football Premier League | |

=== Cleansheets ===
| Rank | No. | Nat. | Player | TFPL | Total |
|---|---|---|---|---|---|
| 1 | 1 | (Chinese Taipei) | Pan Wen-chieh | 11 | 11 |
| 2 | 21 | (Chinese Taipei) | Tuan Yu | 1 | 1 |
| 3 | 62 | (Chinese Taipei) | Lee Ming-wei | — | 0 |
| 3 | 81 | (Japan) | Jun Kochi | — | 0 |
| Totals | | | | 12 | 12 |

=== Disciplinary record ===
| No. | Pos. | Nat. | Name | TFPL | | | Total | | |
| No. | Pos. | Nat. | Name | Booked | (yellow card) (yellow-red card) | Sent off (straight red) | Booked | (yellow card) (yellow-red card) | Sent off (straight red) |
|---|---|---|---|---|---|---|---|---|---|
| 5 | MF | (Chinese Taipei) | Tu Shao-chieh | 5 | | | 5 | | |
| 3 | DF | (Chinese Taipei) | Chen Ting-yang | 3 | | | 3 | | |
| 11 | MF | (Chinese Taipei) | Wu Chun-ching | 3 | | | 3 | | |
| 5 | DF | (Chinese Taipei) | Cheng Hao | 2 | | | 2 | | |
| 8 | MF | (Chinese Taipei) | Yoshitaka Komori | 2 | | | 2 | | |
| 18 | FW | (Chinese Taipei) | Li Mao | 2 | | | 2 | | |
| 2 | DF | (Japan) | Takeo Miyazaki | 1 | | | 1 | | |
| 7 | DF | (Japan) | Keisuke Ogawa | 1 | | | 1 | | |
| 15 | FW | (Japan) | Takayuki Morimoto | 1 | | | 1 | | |
| 20 | MF | (Chile) | Matias Godoy | 1 | | | 1 | | |
| 99 | FW | (Haiti) | Benchy Estama | 1 | | | 1 | | |
| 81 | GK | (Japan) | Jun Kochi | | | 1 | | | 1 |
| Coach | | (Chinese Taipei) | Juang Ming-yan | 2 | | | 2 | | |
| Totals | | | | 24 | | 1 | 24 | | 1 |

Ordered by (red card) , (second yellow card) and (yellow card)
(yellow card) = Number of bookings; (second yellow card) = Number of sending offs after a second yellow card; (red card) = Number of sending offs by a direct red card.

== Awards ==
| Player | Position | Award | Ref. |
|---|---|---|---|
| (Chinese Taipei) Pan Wen-chieh | Goalkeeper | Golden Gloves | |
