= 2019 Taichung Futuro season =

Taichung Futuro
2019 season
- Owner: Yoshitaka Komori
- Head coach: Juang Ming-yan
- TFPL: 5th
- Top goalscorer: League: Chen Sheng-wei (7); Li Mao (7); All: Chen Sheng-wei (7); Li Mao (7)
- Biggest win: Taichung Futuro 5–0 Ming Chuan University; Taichung Futuro 5–0 Ming Chuan University
- Biggest defeat: Tatung 5–0 Taichung Futuro

The 2019 Taichung Futuro season was the club's 1st season and their 1st season in Taiwan Football Premier League.

== Kits ==
- Supplier: Yonex
- Main Sponsor: Sweeten Real Estate Development

== Management team ==
Position	Name
Head coach	(Chinese Taipei) Juang Ming-yan
Assistant coach	(Chinese Taipei) Chen Ting-wei
Team Assistant	(Japan) Takashi Kato
Kit Manager	(Japan) Kaori Katsu
Athletic Trainer	(Chinese Taipei) Lin En

- Last updated: 8 May 2024

== Players ==
N	Pos.	Nat.	Name	Age.	Since
Goalkeepers
1	GK	(Chinese Taipei)	Lin Ting-Hsun	26	2019
18	GK	(Japan)	Shunkun Tani	26	2019
21	GK	(Chinese Taipei)	Tuan Yu	25	2019
Defenders
2	DF	(Honduras)	Luis Galo	27	2019
3	DF	(Chinese Taipei)	Chen Ting-yang	27	2019
4	DF	(Chinese Taipei)	Hung Tzu-kuei	26	2019
5	DF	(Japan)	Yugo Ichiyanagi	34	2019
6	DF	(Chinese Taipei)	Chao Ming-hsiu	22	2019
7	DF	(Japan)	Keisuke Ogawa	33	2019
55	DF	(Chinese Taipei)	Wang Kuan-ju	23	2019
Midfielders
8	MF	(Japan)	Yoshitaka Komori	32	2019
11	MF	(Northern Ireland)	Calum Togneri	30	2019
14	MF	(Chinese Taipei)	Liao Yi-shih	24	2019
15	MF	(Japan)	Shun Takada	25	2019
17	MF	(Chinese Taipei)	Hsu Heng-pin	26	2019
19	MF	(Japan)	Seiji Fujiwara	43	2019
22	MF	(Chinese Taipei)	Tu Kuang-yu		2019
29	MF	(Chinese Taipei)	Chou Ching-shun	23	2019
88	MF	(Chinese Taipei)	Lin Chien-liang	25	2019
Forwards
9	FW	(Japan)	Taisei Kaneko	21	2019
10	FW	(Chinese Taipei)	Chen Chao-an	24	2019
13	FW	(Chinese Taipei)	Shih Chun-chieh	23	2019
16	FW	(Chinese Taipei)	Chen Ting-wei	25	2019
26	FW	(Chinese Taipei)	Li Chung-yun	25	2019
27	FW	(Chinese Taipei)	Li Kai-jie	23	2019
45	FW	(Chinese Taipei)	Chen Sheng-wei	24	2019
96	FW	(Chinese Taipei)	Li Mao (captain)	27	2019

== Transfers ==
=== In ===
No.	Pos.	Player	Transferred from	Fee	Source
Preseason
1	GK	Lin Ting-hsun	–		
4	DF	Hung Tzu-kuei	(Chinese Taipei) NTUS		
5	DF	Yugo Ichiyanagi	(Japan) Thespakusatsu Gunma		
7	DF	Keisuke Ogawa	(Malaysia) Sabah		
8	MF	Yoshitaka Komori	(Chinese Taipei) NTUS		
9	DF	Lee Hsiang-wei	(Chinese Taipei) Tainan City		
10	FW	Chen Chao-an	(Chinese Taipei) NTSC		
11	MF	Calum Togneri	–		
13	FW	Shih Chun-chieh	–		
14	MF	Liao Yi-shih	(Chinese Taipei) NTSC		
15	MF	Shun Takada	–		
16	FW	Chen Ting-wei	(Chinese Taipei) NTSC		
17	MF	Hsu Heng-pin	(Chinese Taipei) NTSC		
19	MF	Seiji Fujiwara	–		
21	GK	Tuan Yu	(Chinese Taipei) NTSC		
22	MF	Tu Kuang-yu	–		
26	FW	Li Chung-yun	–		
27	FW	Li Kai-jie	(Chinese Taipei) NTUS		
28	MF	Wahab Jarjou	(Chinese Taipei) Taicheng Lions		
29	MF	Chou Ching-shun	(Chinese Taipei) NTUS		
30	MF	Liao Tzu-hao	–		
31	GK	Tsai Shuo-che	(Chinese Taipei) NTUS		
42	MF	Fadera Siaka	–		
45	FW	Chen Sheng-wei	(Chinese Taipei) NTUS		
55	DF	Wang Kuan-ju	(Chinese Taipei) NTUS		
88	FW	Lin Chien-liang	–		
96	FW	Li Mao	(Chinese Taipei) Taipower		
Midseason
2	DF	Luis Galo	(Chinese Taipei) Taipei Red Lions	€3,000	
3	DF	Chen Ting-yang	(Hong Kong) Lee Man		
6	DF	Chao Ming-hsiu	(Chinese Taipei) NTUS		

=== Out ===
No.	Pos.	Player	Transferred to	Source
Midseason
9	DF	Lee Hsiang-wei	(Chinese Taipei) Taipower	
28	MF	Wahab Jarjou	–	
30	MF	Liao Tzu-hao	–	
31	GK	Tsai Shuo-che	(Chinese Taipei) Tatung	
42	MF	Fadera Siaka	–	

=== Loans in ===
No.	Pos.	Player	Loaned from	On loan until	Source
Midseason
9	FW	Taisei Kaneko	(Japan) YSCC Yokohama	End of season	
18	GK	Shunkun Tani	(Japan) YSCC Yokohama	End of season	

== Preseason and friendlies ==
1 January 2019 Meizhou Hakka Cup International Invitation	Meizhou Hakka (China)	1–1 (5–3 p)	(Chinese Taipei) Taichung Futuro	Meizhou
20:00 (UTC+8)				Stadium: Wuhua County Olympic Sports Centre

4 January 2019 Meizhou Hakka Cup International Invitation	Persatuan Ka Yin (Malaysia)	0–2	(Chinese Taipei) Taichung Futuro	Meizhou
			Li Mao; Takada	Stadium: Wuhua County Olympic Sports Centre

7 January 2019 Friendly	Gafanha (Portugal)	1–0	(Chinese Taipei) Taichung Futuro	Meizhou
14:00 (UTC+8)				Stadium: Chengjiang Elementary School

== Competitions ==
=== Overall record ===
Competition	First match	Last match	Starting round	Final position	Record							
Competition	First match	Last match	Starting round	Final position	Pld	W	D	L	GF	GA	GD	Win %
TFPL	1 December 2018	1 December 2019	Qualifiers match 1	5th	24	10	4	10	43	27	+16	41.67
Total					24	10	4	10	43	27	+16	41.67

Source: TFPL

=== Taiwan Football Premier League ===
==== Qualifiers ====
Pos	Team	Pld	W	L	GF	GA	GD	Pts	Qualification or relegation
1	Taichung Futuro	3	2	1	6	1	+5	5	Qualification for the 2019 Taiwan Football Premier League
2	Ming Chuan University	3	2	1	7	3	+4	5	Qualification for the 2019 Taiwan Football Premier League
3	Royal Blues	3	1	2	3	5	−2	4	
4	Desafio	3	1	2	3	10	−7	4	

1 December 2018 Match 1	Taichung Futuro	3–0	Ming Chuan University	Taoyuan
16:00 (UTC+8)	Chen Ting-wei 43'; Lee Hsiang-wei 45+2'; Li Mao 52'			Stadium: National Taiwan Sport University

8 December 2018 Match 3	Desafio	0–2	Taichung Futuro	Taoyuan
15:00 (UTC+8)			Chen Ting-wei 1'; Lee Hsiang-wei 15'	Stadium: National Taiwan Sport University

15 December 2018 Match 4	Royal Blues	1–1 (4–2 p)	Taichung Futuro	Taoyuan
16:00 (UTC+8)	Murphy 90+6'		Chen Ting-wei 18'	Stadium: National Taiwan Sport University

==== League table ====
Pos	Team	Pld	W	D	L	GF	GA	GD	Pts	Qualification or relegation
1	Tatung (C)	21	16	4	1	75	18	+57	52	Qualification for the AFC Cup group stage
2	Taipower	21	15	4	2	47	19	+28	49	Qualification for the AFC Cup qualifying play-offs
3	Hang Yuen	21	11	8	2	65	31	+34	41	
4	Tainan City TSG	21	10	3	8	43	44	−1	33	
5	Taichung Futuro	21	8	4	9	37	26	+11	28	
6	NTUS	21	4	3	14	23	59	−36	15	
7	Ming Chuan University	21	3	2	16	20	75	−55	11	Transfer to 2020 Taiwan Football Premier League qualifiers
8	Taipei Red Lions	21	1	4	16	20	58	−38	7	Transfer to 2020 Taiwan Football Premier League qualifiers

(C) Champions

==== Results by round ====
Round	1	2	3	4	5	6	7	8	9	10	11	12	13	14	15	16	17	18	19	20	21
Result	D	L	L	L	W	W	D	D	L	L	L	W	W	W	D	L	L	L	W	W	W
Position	5	7	7	7	5	5	5	5	5	5	5	5	5	5	5	5	5	5	5	5	5

Source: TFPL
W = Win; D = Draw; L = Loss

==== Matches ====
14 April 2019 1	NTUS	1–1	Taichung Futuro	Hsinchu County
16:00 (UTC+8)	Otomo 60'	Recap	Lee Hsiang-wei 50'	Stadium: Hsinchu County Second Stadium; Referee: Kao Jung-fang

28 April 2019 2	Tainan City TSG	1–0	Taichung Futuro	Tainan
19:00 (UTC+8)	Ichiyanagi 40' (o.g.)			Stadium: Tainan Municipal Football Field; Referee: Kuo Chan-yu

5 May 2019 3	Taichung Futuro	0–1	Tatung	Hsinchu County
19:00 (UTC+8)			Chen Jui-chieh 45'	Stadium: Hsinchu County Second Stadium; Referee: Lee Tsung-ying

12 May 2019 4	Taipower	3–1	Taichung Futuro	Kaohsiung
19:00 (UTC+8)	Lin Chang-lun 49'; Ko Yu-ting 57', 76'		Chen Chao-an 36'	Stadium: National Stadium; Referee: Chen Chia-hao

19 May 2019 5	Ming Chuan University	0–4	Taichung Futuro	Kaohsiung
16:00 (UTC+8)			Chen Sheng-wei 2', 35', 54'; Hung Tzu-kuei 89'	Stadium: National Stadium; Referee: Kuo Po-hung

26 May 2019 6	Taichung Futuro	4–0	Taipei Red Lions	Kaohsiung
19:00 (UTC+8)	Li Mao 40' (pen.), 62'; Li Kai-jie 50'; Li Chung-yun 90'			Stadium: National Stadium; Referee: Yu Ming-hsun

16 June 2019 7	Taichung Futuro	1–1	Hang Yuan	Hsinchu County
16:00 (UTC+8)	Lee Hsiang-wei 90+5'		Estama 45+3'	Stadium: Hsinchu County Second Stadium; Referee: Chen Hsin-chuan

23 June 2019 8	Hang Yuan	2–2	Taichung Futuro	Taipei
16:00 (UTC+8)	Estama 68' (pen.); Hsu Yi 76'		Hung Tzu-kuei 16'; Lopez 46' (o.g.)	Stadium: Taipei Municipal Stadium; Referee: Kao Jung-fang

30 June 2019 9	Taichung Futuro	2–3	Tainan City TSG	Hsinchu County
16:00 (UTC+8)	Li Mao 30', 83'		Pai Shao-yu 8'; Huang Cheng-tsung 65'; Kuo Po-wei 76'	Stadium: Hsinchu County Second Stadium; Referee: Yu Ming-hsun

28 July 2019 11	Taichung Futuro	1–2	Taipower	Hsinchu County
16:00 (UTC+8)	Chen Chao-an 1'		Chiu I-huan 3'; Tseng Chih-wei 90+3'	Stadium: Hsinchu County Second Stadium; Referee: Yu Ming-hsun

4 August 2019 12	Taichung Futuro	5–0	Ming Chuan University	Hsinchu County
16:00 (UTC+8)	Li Mao 2'; Chen Sheng-wei 54', 58'; Chen Chao-an 68'; Takada 85'			Stadium: Hsinchu County Second Stadium; Referee: Chen Hsin-chuan

11 August 2019 13	Taipei Red Lions	0–1	Taichung Futuro	Hsinchu County
16:00 (UTC+8)			Chen Chao-an 45+1'	Stadium: Hsinchu County Second Stadium

14 August 2019 14	Taichung Futuro	3–0	NTUS	Taichung
16:00 (UTC+8)	Lee Hsiang-wei 24'; Takada 55'; Hung Tzu-kuei 79'			Stadium: Taiyuan Football Field; Referee: Lin Te-en

21 August 2019 10	Tatung	5–0	Taichung Futuro	New Taipei
19:00 (UTC+8)	Chen Wei-chuan 17'; Fenelus 29', 36'; Chang Hao-wei 44'; Kouame 64'			Stadium: Fu Jen Catholic University; Referee: Chen Hsin-chuan

12 September 2019 15	Taichung Futuro	1–1	Hang Yuan	New Taipei
19:00 (UTC+8)	Chen Chao-an 2'		Estama 20'	Stadium: Fu Jen Catholic University; Referee: Yu Ming-hsun

15 September 2019 16	Tainan City TSG	2–1	Taichung Futuro	Kaohsiung
16:00 (UTC+8)	Godoy 62'; Wu Chun-ching 88'		Li Mao 3'	Stadium: National Stadium; Referee: Kuo Chan-yu

22 September 2019 17	Taichung Futuro	0–1	Tatung	Hsinchu County
19:00 (UTC+8)			Fenelus 61'	Stadium: Hsinchu County Second Stadium; Referee: Lee Tsung-ying

29 September 2019 18	Taipower	3–0	Taichung Futuro	Kaohsiung
19:00 (UTC+8)	Huang Han-sheng 4'; Lin Chang-lun 9' (pen.); Lee Hsiang-wei 75'			Stadium: National Stadium; Referee: Chen Chia-hao

3 November 2019 19	Taichung Futuro	5–0	Ming Chuan University	Hsinchu County
19:00 (UTC+8)	Kaneko 32', 79'; Chen Sheng-wei 50'; Chao Ming-hsiu 64'; Ichiyanagi 69'			Stadium: Hsinchu County Second Stadium; Referee: Hsu Min-yu

24 November 2019 20	Taipei Red Lions	0–2	Taichung Futuro	Hsinchu County
19:00 (UTC+8)			Chen Chao-an 18'; Chen Sheng-wei 42'	Stadium: Hsinchu County Second Stadium; Referee: Lin Te-en

1 December 2019 21	NTUS	0–3	Taichung Futuro	Kaohsiung
16:00 (UTC+8)			Galo 14'; Takada 28'; Li Mao 35'	Stadium: National Stadium; Referee: Chen Chia-hao

== Statistics ==
=== Squad statistics ===
No.	Pos	Nat	Player	Total		TMFL (Note: Qualifiers stats were excluded.)	
No.	Pos	Nat	Player	Apps	Goals	Apps	Goals
Goalkeepers
1	GK	(Chinese Taipei) TPE	Lin Ting-Hsun	0	0	0	0
18	GK	(Japan) JPN	Shunkun Tani	7	0	6+1	0
21	GK	(Chinese Taipei) TPE	Tuan Yu	14	0	11+3	0
Defenders
2	DF	(Honduras) HON	Luis Galo	6	1	5+1	1
3	DF	(Chinese Taipei) TPE	Chen Ting-yang	5	0	3+2	0
4	DF	(Chinese Taipei) TPE	Hung Tzu-kuei	21	3	18+3	3
5	DF	(Japan) JPN	Yugo Ichiyanagi	19	1	19	1
6	DF	(Chinese Taipei) TPE	Chao Ming-hsiu	7	1	7	1
7	DF	(Japan) JPN	Keisuke Ogawa	17	0	15+2	0
55	DF	(Chinese Taipei) TPE	Wang Kuan-ju	19	0	13+6	0
Midfielders
8	MF	(Japan) JPN	Yoshitaka Komori	21	0	21	0
11	MF	(Northern Ireland) NIR	Calum Togneri	8	0	2+6	0
14	MF	(Chinese Taipei) TPE	Liao Yi-shih	4	0	0+4	0
15	MF	(Japan) JPN	Shun Takada	19	3	19	3
17	MF	(Chinese Taipei) TPE	Hsu Heng-pin	1	0	1	0
19	MF	(Japan) JPN	Seiji Fujiwara	1	0	0+1	0
22	MF	(Chinese Taipei) TPE	Tu Kuang-yu	2	0	0+2	0
29	MF	(Chinese Taipei) TPE	Chou Ching-shun	4	0	1+3	0
88	MF	(Chinese Taipei) TPE	Lin Chien-liang	10	0	1+9	0
Forwards
9	FW	(Japan) JPN	Taisei Kaneko	5	2	4+1	2
10	FW	(Chinese Taipei) TPE	Chen Chao-an	20	6	20	6
13	FW	(Chinese Taipei) TPE	Shih Chun-chieh	0	0	0	0
16	FW	(Chinese Taipei) TPE	Chen Ting-wei	9	0	6+3	0
26	FW	(Chinese Taipei) TPE	Li Chung-yun	14	1	0+14	1
27	FW	(Chinese Taipei) TPE	Li Kai-jie	15	1	11+4	1
45	FW	(Chinese Taipei) TPE	Chen Sheng-wei	19	7	17+2	7
96	FW	(Chinese Taipei) TPE	Li Mao	18	7	15+3	7
Players who left during the season but made an appearance
9	DF	(Chinese Taipei) TPE	Lee Hsiang-wei	12	3	12	3
30	MF	(Chinese Taipei) TPE	Liao Tzu-hao	1	0	0+1	0
31	GK	(Chinese Taipei) TPE	Tsai Shuo-che	4	0	4	0
42	MF	(The Gambia) GAM	Fadera Siaka	1	0	0+1	0
Own goals (1)

=== Goalscorers ===
Rank	No.	Pos.	Nat.	Player	TFPL (Note: Qualifiers stats were excluded.)	Total
1	45	FW	(Chinese Taipei)	Chen Sheng-wei	7	7
1	96	FW	(Chinese Taipei)	Li Mao	7	7
3	10	FW	(Chinese Taipei)	Chen Chao-an	6	6
4	4	DF	(Chinese Taipei)	Hung Tzu-kuei	3	3
4	9	DF	(Chinese Taipei)	Lee Hsiang-wei	3	3
4	15	MF	(Japan)	Shun Takada	3	3
7	9	FW	(Japan)	Taisei Kaneko	2	2
8	2	DF	(Honduras)	Luis Galo	1	1
8	5	DF	(Japan)	Yugo Ichiyanagi	1	1
8	6	DF	(Chinese Taipei)	Chao Ming-hsiu	1	1
8	26	FW	(Chinese Taipei)	Li Chung-yun	1	1
8	27	FW	(Chinese Taipei)	Li Kai-jie	1	1
Own goals (from the opponents)					1	1
Totals					37	37

=== Hat-tricks ===
Player	Against	Result	Date	Competition	Ref
(Chinese Taipei) Chen Sheng-wei	Ming Chuan University	0–4	19 May 2019	Taiwan Football Premier League	

=== Cleansheets ===
Rank	No.	Nat.	Player	TFPL (Note: Qualifiers stats were excluded.)	Total
1	21	(Chinese Taipei)	Tuan Yu	7	7
2	18	(Japan)	Shunkun Tani	3	3
3	31	(Chinese Taipei)	Tsai Shuo-che	0	0
3	1	(Chinese Taipei)	Lin Ting-hsun	—	0
Totals				10	10
