= 2026 FIFA World Cup qualification – AFC first round =

International football competition

Tournament details
- Dates: 12–17 October 2023
- Teams: 20 (from 1 confederation)

Tournament statistics
- Matches played: 20
- Goals scored: 51 (2.55 per match)
- Attendance: 138,247 (6,912 per match)
- Top scorer(s): (Indonesia) Dimas Drajad (Indonesia) Ramadhan Sananta (3 goals each)

The AFC first round of 2026 FIFA World Cup qualification, which also served as the first round of 2027 AFC Asian Cup qualification, was played from 12 to 17 October 2023.

== Format ==
A total of twenty teams were drawn into ten home-and-away ties, the winners of which advanced to the second round. As the second round draw occurred on the same date as the first round draw, each winner already knew their second round schedule.

== Schedule ==
The schedule was as follows:

Matchday	Date(s)	Matches
Matchday 1	12 October 2023	1 v 2
Matchday 2	17 October 2023	2 v 1

== Draw ==
The draw for the first round was held on 27 July 2023 in Kuala Lumpur, Malaysia.

These 20 teams were divided into ten pairings, with each pair playing home and away across 12 and 17 October 2023. The numbers in parentheses indicate the FIFA Men's World Ranking of July 2023.

Note: Bolded teams qualified for the second round.

Pot 1	Pot 2
**Hong Kong** (149); **Indonesia** (150); **Chinese Taipei** (153); Maldives (155); **Yemen** (156); **Afghanistan** (157); **Singapore** (158); **Myanmar** (160); **Nepal** (175); Cambodia (176)	Macau (182); Mongolia (183); Bhutan (185); Laos (187); **Bangladesh** (189); Brunei (190); Timor-Leste (192); **Pakistan** (201); Guam (203); Sri Lanka (204) (Note: Sri Lanka was suspended for government interference in football, but was provisionally included in the draw, pending a resolution. After the issue was settled, the ban was lifted, allowing the team to participate.)

== Summary ==
The ten winners advanced to the second round of qualifying.

Team 1	Agg.	Team 2	1st leg	2nd leg
Afghanistan	2–0	Mongolia	1–0	1–0
Maldives	2–3	Bangladesh	1–1	1–2
Singapore	3–1	Guam	2–1	1–0
Yemen	4–1	Sri Lanka	3–0	1–1
Myanmar	5–1	Macau	5–1	0–0
Cambodia	0–1	Pakistan	0–0	0–1
Chinese Taipei	7–0	Timor-Leste	4–0	3–0
Indonesia	12–0	Brunei	6–0	6–0
Hong Kong	4–2	Bhutan	4–0	0–2
Nepal	2–1	Laos	1–1	1–0

== Matches ==
12 October 2023
19:00 UTC+5

Afghanistan	1–0	Mongolia
Sharza 60'	Report (FIFA); Report (AFC)

Pamir Stadium, Dushanbe (Tajikistan) (Note: Afghanistan played their home game at a neutral venue due to the ongoing Taliban offensive.)
Attendance: 1,456
Referee: Qasim Al-Hatmi (Oman)
17 October 2023
15:00 UTC+8

Mongolia	0–1	Afghanistan
	Report (FIFA); Report (AFC)	Noor 72'

MFF Football Centre, Ulaanbaatar
Attendance: 2,185
Referee: Hassan Akrami (Iran)

Afghanistan won 2–0 on aggregate and advanced to the second round.

12 October 2023
16:00 UTC+5

Maldives	1–1	Bangladesh
Nazeem 87'	Report (FIFA); Report (AFC)	Uddin 90+2'

National Football Stadium, Malé
Attendance: 2,500
Referee: Vahid Kazemi (Iran)
17 October 2023
17:45 UTC+6

Bangladesh	2–1	Maldives
Hossain 11'; Fahim 46'	Report (FIFA); Report (AFC)	Aisam 36'

Bashundhara Kings Arena, Dhaka
Attendance: 6,729
Referee: Ammar Mahfoodh (Bahrain)

Bangladesh won 3–2 on aggregate and advanced to the second round.

12 October 2023
19:30 UTC+8

Singapore	2–1	Guam
Van Huizen 35'; Mahler 41'	Report (FIFA); Report (AFC)	Cunliffe 90'

National Stadium, Singapore
Attendance: 10,355
Referee: Mohammad Ghabayen (Jordan)
17 October 2023
14:45 UTC+10

Guam	0–1	Singapore
	Report (FIFA); Report (AFC)	Shawal 81'

GFA National Training Center, Dededo
Attendance: 1,012
Referee: Chen Hsin-chuan (Chinese Taipei)

Singapore won 3–1 on aggregate and advanced to the second round.

12 October 2023
20:00 UTC+3

Yemen	3–0	Sri Lanka
Maher 33'; Al-Gahwashi 67'; Al-Matari 90+3'	Report (FIFA); Report (AFC)

Damac Club Stadium, Khamis Mushait (Saudi Arabia) (Note: Yemen played their home game at a neutral venue due to the ongoing civil war in Yemen.)
Attendance: 1,526
Referee: Nasrullo Kabirov (Tajikistan)
17 October 2023
15:00 UTC+5:30

Sri Lanka	1–1	Yemen
Rathnayake 89'	Report (FIFA); Report (AFC)	Al-Matari 4'

Colombo Racecourse, Colombo
Attendance: 3,000
Referee: Clifford Daypuyat (Philippines)

Yemen won 4–1 on aggregate and advanced to the second round.

12 October 2023
16:00 UTC+6:30

Myanmar	5–1	Macau
Lwin Moe Aung 39', 90+5'; Soe Moe Kyaw 62'; Aung Kaung Mann 81'; Nay Moe Naing 90+1'	Report (FIFA); Report (AFC)	Torrão 55'

Thuwunna Stadium, Yangon
Attendance: 6,213
Referee: Pranjal Banerjee (India)
17 October 2023
19:30 UTC+8

Macau	0–0	Myanmar
	Report (FIFA); Report (AFC)

Estádio Campo Desportivo, Macau
Attendance: 2,187
Referee: Salim Al-Majarafi (Oman)

Myanmar won 5–1 on aggregate and advanced to the second round.

12 October 2023
19:00 UTC+7

Cambodia	0–0	Pakistan
	Report (FIFA); Report (AFC)

Olympic Stadium, Phnom Penh
Attendance: 11,718
Referee: Baraa Aisha (Palestine)
17 October 2023
14:00 UTC+5

Pakistan	1–0	Cambodia
Hamid 68'	Report (FIFA); Report (AFC)

Jinnah Sports Stadium, Islamabad
Attendance: 9,562
Referee: Feras Taweel (Syria)

Pakistan won 1–0 on aggregate and advanced to the second round.

12 October 2023
19:00 UTC+8

Chinese Taipei	4–0	Timor-Leste
Yu Yao-hsing 4', 60'; Chen Ting-yang 57'; Ko Yu-ting 88'	Report (FIFA); Report (AFC)

National Stadium, Kaohsiung
Attendance: 1,894
Referee: Ismaeel Habib Ali (Bahrain)
17 October 2023
19:00 UTC+8

Timor-Leste	0–3	Chinese Taipei
	Report (FIFA); Report (AFC)	Yu Chia-huang 18'; Wu Yen-shu 21'; Kouamé 24'

National Stadium, Kaohsiung (Taiwan) (Note: Timor-Leste played their home game in Kaohsiung, due to the National Stadium in Dili failing to meet FIFA standards.)
Attendance: 745
Referee: Tejas Nagvenkar (India)

Chinese Taipei won 7–0 on aggregate and advanced to the second round.

12 October 2023
19:00 UTC+7

Indonesia	6–0	Brunei
Drajad 7', 72', 90+2'; Ridho 12'; Sananta 63' (pen.), 67'	Report (FIFA); Report (AFC)

Gelora Bung Karno Stadium, Jakarta
Attendance: 23,318
Referee: Bijan Heydari (Iran)
17 October 2023
20:15 UTC+8

Brunei	0–6	Indonesia
	Report (FIFA); Report (AFC)	Caraka 6', 44'; Egy 42'; Witan 47' (pen.); Ridho 63'; Sananta 82'

Hassanal Bolkiah National Stadium, Bandar Seri Begawan
Attendance: 17,281
Referee: Ahmed Faisal Al-Ali (Jordan)

Indonesia won 12–0 on aggregate and advanced to the second round.

12 October 2023
20:00 UTC+8

Hong Kong	4–0	Bhutan
Udebuluzor 10', 16'; S. Chan 28'; Norbu 35' (o.g.)	Report (FIFA); Report (AFC)

Hong Kong Stadium, Hong Kong
Attendance: 10,259
Referee: Razlan Joffri Ali (Malaysia)
17 October 2023
18:00 UTC+6

Bhutan	2–0	Hong Kong
Gyeltshen 28'; Chogyal 47'	Report (FIFA); Report (AFC)

Changlimithang Stadium, Thimphu
Attendance: 5,300
Referee: Thoriq Alkatiri (Indonesia)

Hong Kong won 4–2 on aggregate and advanced to the second round.

12 October 2023
17:30 UTC+5:45

Nepal	1–1	Laos
Bista 48'	Report (FIFA); Report (AFC)	Bounkong 33'

Dasharath Rangasala, Kathmandu
Attendance: 11,235
Referee: Nivon Robesh Gamini (Sri Lanka)
17 October 2023
19:00 UTC+7

Laos	0–1	Nepal
	Report (FIFA); Report (AFC)	Dangi 53'

New Laos National Stadium, Vientiane
Attendance: 9,772
Referee: Ali Reda (Lebanon)

Nepal won 2–1 on aggregate and advanced to the second round.

== Ranking of best losing teams ==
The first round doubled as preliminary qualifying for the 2027 AFC Asian Cup. As originally planned, the top-ranked losing team would progress directly to the third round of Asian Cup qualifying, while the remainder would join the Northern Mariana Islands in the play-off round. However, Guam withdrew and the Northern Mariana Islands were not included in the draw for the play-off round announced on 1 May 2024. This resulted in the top three losing teams (Bhutan, Maldives, and Laos) moving directly to the third round, and the remaining six teams entering the play-off round.

Pos	Team	Pld	W	D	L	GF	GA	GD	Pts	Qualification
1	Bhutan	2	1	0	1	2	4	−2	3	Asian Cup qualifying third round
2	Maldives	2	0	1	1	2	3	−1	1	Asian Cup qualifying third round
3	Laos	2	0	1	1	1	2	−1	1	Asian Cup qualifying third round
4	Cambodia	2	0	1	1	0	1	−1	1	Asian Cup qualifying play-off round
5	Sri Lanka	2	0	1	1	1	4	−3	1	Asian Cup qualifying play-off round
6	Macau	2	0	1	1	1	5	−4	1	Asian Cup qualifying play-off round
7	Guam	2	0	0	2	1	3	−2	0	Withdrew from play-off round
8	Mongolia	2	0	0	2	0	2	−2	0	Asian Cup qualifying play-off round
9	Timor-Leste	2	0	0	2	0	7	−7	0	Asian Cup qualifying play-off round
10	Brunei	2	0	0	2	0	12	−12	0	Asian Cup qualifying play-off round

Source: AFC
Rules for classification: 1) Points; 2) Goal difference; 3) Goals scored; 4) Lower disciplinary points total; 5) Drawing of lots.

== Goalscorers ==
There were 51 goals scored in 20 matches, for an average of 2.55 goals per match.

3 goals

- (Indonesia national football team) Dimas Drajad
- (Indonesia national football team) Ramadhan Sananta

2 goals

- (Chinese Taipei national football team) Yu Yao-hsing
- (Hong Kong national football team) Michael Udebuluzor
- (Indonesia national football team) Hokky Caraka
- (Indonesia national football team) Rizky Ridho
- (Myanmar national football team) Lwin Moe Aung
- (Yemen national football team) Abdulwasea Al-Matari

1 goal

- (Afghanistan national football team) Farshad Noor
- (Afghanistan national football team) Jabar Sharza
- (Bangladesh national football team) Foysal Ahmed Fahim
- (Bangladesh national football team) Rakib Hossain
- (Bangladesh national football team) Md Saad Uddin
- (Bhutan national football team) Lobzang Chogyal
- (Bhutan national football team) Chencho Gyeltshen
- (Chinese Taipei national football team) Ange Kouamé
- (Chinese Taipei national football team) Chen Ting-yang
- (Chinese Taipei national football team) Ko Yu-ting
- (Chinese Taipei national football team) Wu Yen-shu
- (Chinese Taipei national football team) Yu Chia-huang
- (Guam national football team) Jason Cunliffe
- (Hong Kong national football team) Shinichi Chan
- (Indonesia national football team) Egy Maulana Vikri
- (Indonesia national football team) Witan Sulaeman
- (Laos national football team) Bounphachan Bounkong
- (Macau national football team) Niki Torrão
- (Maldives national football team) Aisam Ibrahim
- (Maldives national football team) Hassan Nazeem
- (Myanmar national football team) Aung Kaung Mann
- (Myanmar national football team) Nay Moe Naing
- (Myanmar national football team) Soe Moe Kyaw
- (Nepal national football team) Anjan Bista
- (Nepal national football team) Manish Dangi
- (Pakistan national football team) Harun Hamid
- (Singapore national football team) Shawal Anuar
- (Singapore national football team) Jacob Mahler
- (Singapore national football team) Christopher van Huizen
- (Sri Lanka national football team) Charitha Rathnayake
- (Yemen national football team) Nasser Al-Gahwashi
- (Yemen national football team) Ahmed Maher

1 own goal

- (Bhutan national football team) Tenzin Norbu (against Hong Kong)

== Discipline ==
A player was automatically suspended for the next match for the following infractions:

- Receiving a red card (red card suspensions may be extended for serious infractions)
- Receiving two yellow cards in two different matches (yellow card suspensions are carried forward to further qualification rounds, but not the finals or any other future international matches)

The following suspension was served during the first round:

Team	Player	Infraction	Suspended for matches
Mongolia	Tsend-Ayuush Khürelbaatar	(red card) vs Afghanistan (12 October 2023)	vs Afghanistan (17 October 2023) vs Azerbaijan (22 March 2024)
