= Lee Jian-liang =

Taiwanese footballer

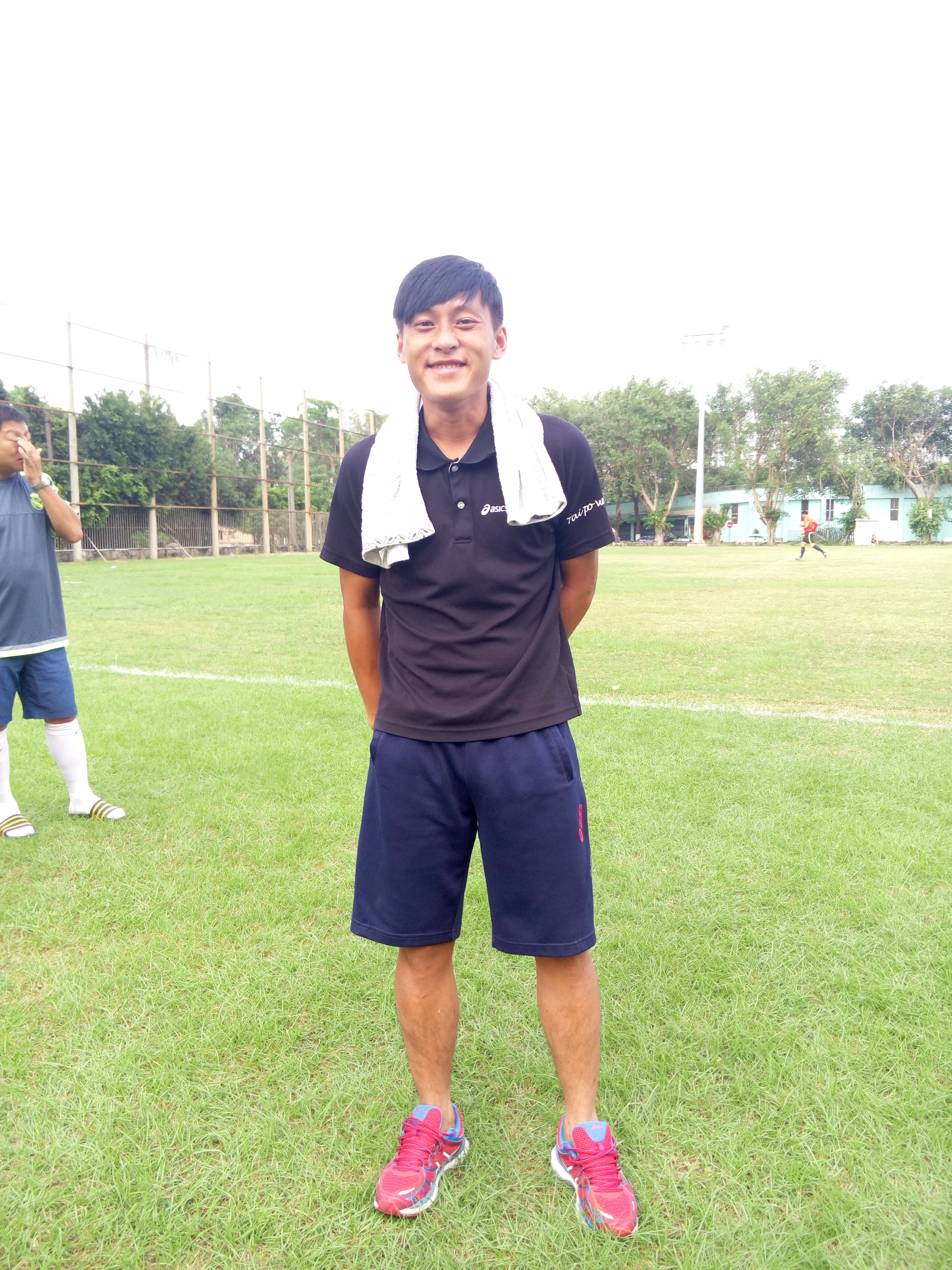
- Lee Jian-liang in 2015

Personal information
- Date of birth: 10 August 1991 (age 35)
- Place of birth: Hualien, Taiwan
- Height: 1.68 m (5 ft 6 in)
- Position: Defender

Team information
- Current team: Taiwan Power Company

Senior career*
Years	Team	Apps	(Gls)
2010–2013	NTCPE F.C.		
2013–2014	NSTC Tainan		
2014–	Taiwan Power Company		

International career^{‡}
2015–	Chinese Taipei	4	(0)
- * Club domestic league appearances and goals ‡ National team caps and goals as of 30 June 2016

Lee Jian-liang (Chinese: 李健良; born 10 August 1991) is a Taiwanese footballer who currently plays as a defender for the national and club level. Lee is an indigenous Taiwanese and is of Truku descent.
