= Filip Engelman =

Serbian footballer

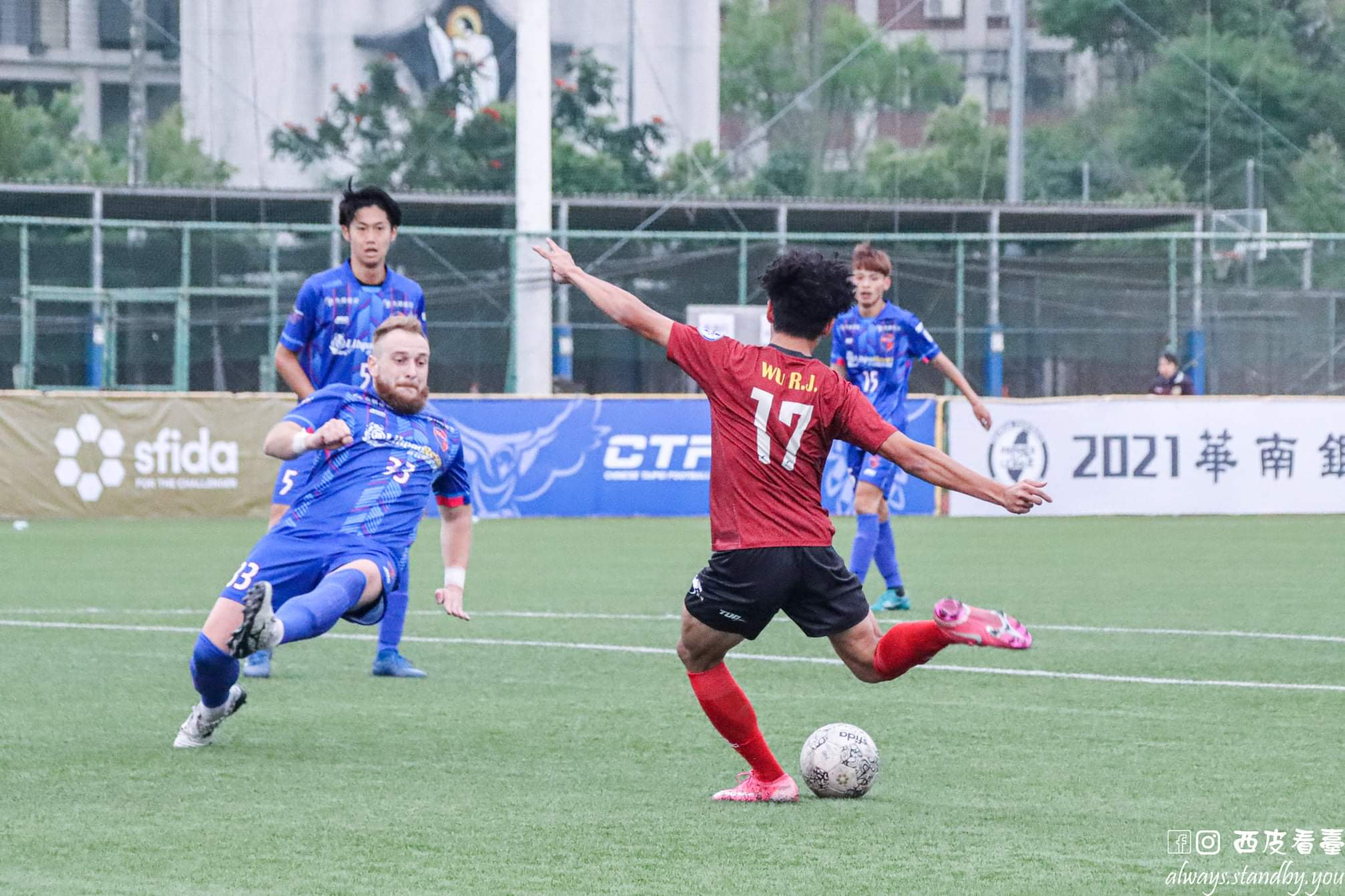
- Filip Engelman.jpg

Personal information
- Full name: Željko Filip Engelman
- Date of birth: 9 February 1991 (age 35)
- Place of birth: Belgrade, SR Serbia, SFR Yugoslavia
- Height: 1.88 m (6 ft 2 in)
- Position: Centre-back

Senior career*
Years	Team	Apps	(Gls)
2015	Jezero		
2016	Mladost Antin	4	(0)
2016	Bjelovar	2	(0)
2017	Cosmos Nowotaniec		
2018	Slavija Sarajevo	2	(0)
2018	Ulaanbaatar		
2021	Taichung Futuro		
- * Club domestic league appearances and goals as of 2 November 2019

Željko Filip Engelman (Serbian Cyrillic: Жељко Филип Енгелман; born 9 February 1991) is a Serbian professional footballer who plays as a centre-back.

== Club career ==
In 2015, Engelman restarted his international career this time in Montenegro for Jezero, making his official debut in a 0–0 draw with OFK Igalo. In January 2016 he moved to Croatia where he played with Mladost Antin, where he debuted in a loss against Međimurje 0–2. After that he moved to Bjelovar in a season where the club had a historical result in the Croatian Cup. After the first round where they won against Marsonia, in the next round they won against NK Zagreb with 4–0, in the next round they played against Dinamo Zagreb and lost in a hard game with 1–2. After that he made a transfer to Poland club Cosmos Nowotaniec. He then returned one more time to Croatia to Vukovar 1991.

In January 2018, Engelman signed for Bosnian and Herzegovinian club Slavija Sarajevo. He debuted in a Prva Liga RS match against Sutjeska Foča in a 1–2 loss, playing 90 minutes. He signed in May for Mongolian club Ulaanbaatar.
