= Huang Tzu-ming =

Taiwanese football player (born 2000)

Personal information
- Date of birth: 18 November 2000 (age 26)
- Place of birth: Taichung, Taiwan
- Position: Defender

Team information
- Current team: Taiwan Power Company F.C.

Senior career*
Years	Team	Apps	(Gls)
-2019	Hualien Vocational School of Agriculture		
2019–2023	Hasus TSU		
2023	Brew Kashima		
2024-	Taipower		

International career^{‡}
2023–	Chinese Taipei	14	(0)
- * Club domestic league appearances and goals as of 25 May 2026 ‡ National team caps and goals as of 13 November 2026

Huang Tzu-ming (Chinese: 黃子銘; born 18 November 2000) is a Taiwanese footballer who plays as a defender for Taiwan Power Company F.C. and the Chinese Taipei national team.

== Early life ==
Huang's mother died after suffering from illness when he was an elementary school student.

== College career ==
Huang attended the National Taiwan University of Sport.

== Club career ==
In 2020, Huang had the opportunity to trial for a Portuguese side, C.D. Cova da Piedade.

== International career ==
Huang has represented Chinese Taipei internationally at youth level, and captained the under-23 team.

== Style of play ==
Huang mainly operates as a defender and is known for his strength and leadership.

== Personal life ==
Huang has four siblings.
