= Wu Yen-shu =

Taiwanese footballer (born 1999)

Wu Yen-shu 吳彥澍
Personal information
- Date of birth: 21 October 1999 (age 27)
- Place of birth: Taitung County, Taiwan
- Height: 1.72 m (5 ft 8 in)
- Position: Midfielder

Team information
- Current team: Dalian K'un City
- Number: 8

Youth career
- –2019: Hualien High School

Senior career*
Years	Team	Apps	(Gls)
2019–2023	Hang Yuan	59	(12)
2023	Liaoning Shenyang Urban	9	(0)
2024	Taipower	6	(3)
2024	Heilongjiang Ice City	14	(0)
2025–	Dalian K'un City	56	(3)

International career^{‡}
2018–	Chinese Taipei	16	(3)
- * Club domestic league appearances and goals as of 14 November 2026 ‡ National team caps and goals as of 13 November 2026

Wu Yen-shu (Chinese: 吳彥澍; born 21 October 1999) is a Taiwanese footballer who plays as a midfielder for Dalian K'un City and the Chinese Taipei national team.

== Early life ==
Wu attended Hualien High School.

== Club career ==
Wu was regarded as a Taiwan prospect. He trialed for Japanese J3 League side FC Ryukyu.

== International career ==
Wu was called up to represent Taiwan internationally at under-23 level at the age of seventeen.

=== International goals ===
No.	Date	Venue	Opponent	Score	Result	Competition
1.	19 June 2023	Rizal Memorial Stadium, Manila, Philippines	Philippines	1–0	3–2	Friendly
2.	17 October 2023	National Stadium, Kaohsiung, Taiwan	Timor-Leste	2–0	3–0	2026 FIFA World Cup qualification
3.	26 March 2024	Dolen Omurzakov Stadium, Bishkek, Kyrgyzstan	Kyrgyzstan	1–4	1–5	2026 FIFA World Cup qualification

== Style of play ==
Wu has been the free-kick taker for the Chinese Taipei national football team.

== Personal life ==
Wu has worked at a convenience store.
