= CPC Corporation F.C. =

Taiwanese football club

CPC Corporation
- Full name: Chinese Petroleum Corporation Football Club
- Founded: 2020; 6 years ago
- Ground: Various
- Owner: CPC Corporation
- Coach: Zhong Jian-Wu
- League: Taiwan Football Challenge League
- 2021: Taiwan Football Premier League, 6th of 8
Home colours	Away colours

CPC Corporation Football Club (Chinese: 台灣中油足球隊) was a Taiwanese professional football club which last competed in the Taiwan Football Premier League. It was named after the main sponsor, the CPC Corporation.

== History ==
The team is a founder of the Taiwan Football Challenge League, participating in the league's inaugural season, and winning the 2020 Challenge League title in their first attempt. The next season, now debuting in the first division, they finished at the 6th place, escaping the relegation risk by table position. However, they withdrew in 2022, supposedly due to changes in its internal business strategy.

== 2021 squad ==
Note: Flags indicate national team as defined under FIFA eligibility rules; some limited exceptions apply. Players may hold more than one non-FIFA nationality.

No.	Pos.	Nation	Player
1	GK	TPE	Hung Yen-hsiang
2	DF	TPE	Yen Ting-yung
5	FW	TPE	Cheng Chun-hsien
7	FW	FRA	Zacchary Meftah
8	MF	TPE	Pan Yu-ting
10	MF	CHI	Matias Godoy
11	MF	TPE	Ro Ji-xian
13	DF	TPE	Wang Kuan-ju
14	DF	TPE	Ling Wen-jui
15	DF	TPE	Yang Chih-heng
16	DF	TPE	Hsiao Cheng-hung
17	MF	TPE	Chen Kai-wen
18	MF	TPE	Tseng Chung-chih

No.	Pos.	Nation	Player
19	FW	TPE	Chou Cheng
20	MF	TPE	Wang Sheng-han
21	MF	MAR	Soufiane Khoulal
22	MF	TPE	Yeh Yu-hung
23	DF	TPE	Yu Chun-hsiang
24	MF	TPE	Chou Ching-shun
26	MF	TPE	Yen Ting-han
28	MF	ENG	Jake Clarke
30	GK	BRA	Rafael Rocci
31	GK	TPE	Tsai Shuo-che
32	GK	TPE	Kung Chen-chung
33	DF	TPE	Chen Chia-chun
35	MF	TPE	Hsu Huan-sheng
69	MF	TPE	Wei Chen-hsuan
80	DF	TPE	Wang Hsiung-chu
