= Chen Chao-an =

Taiwanese footballer

Chen Chao-an 陳昭安
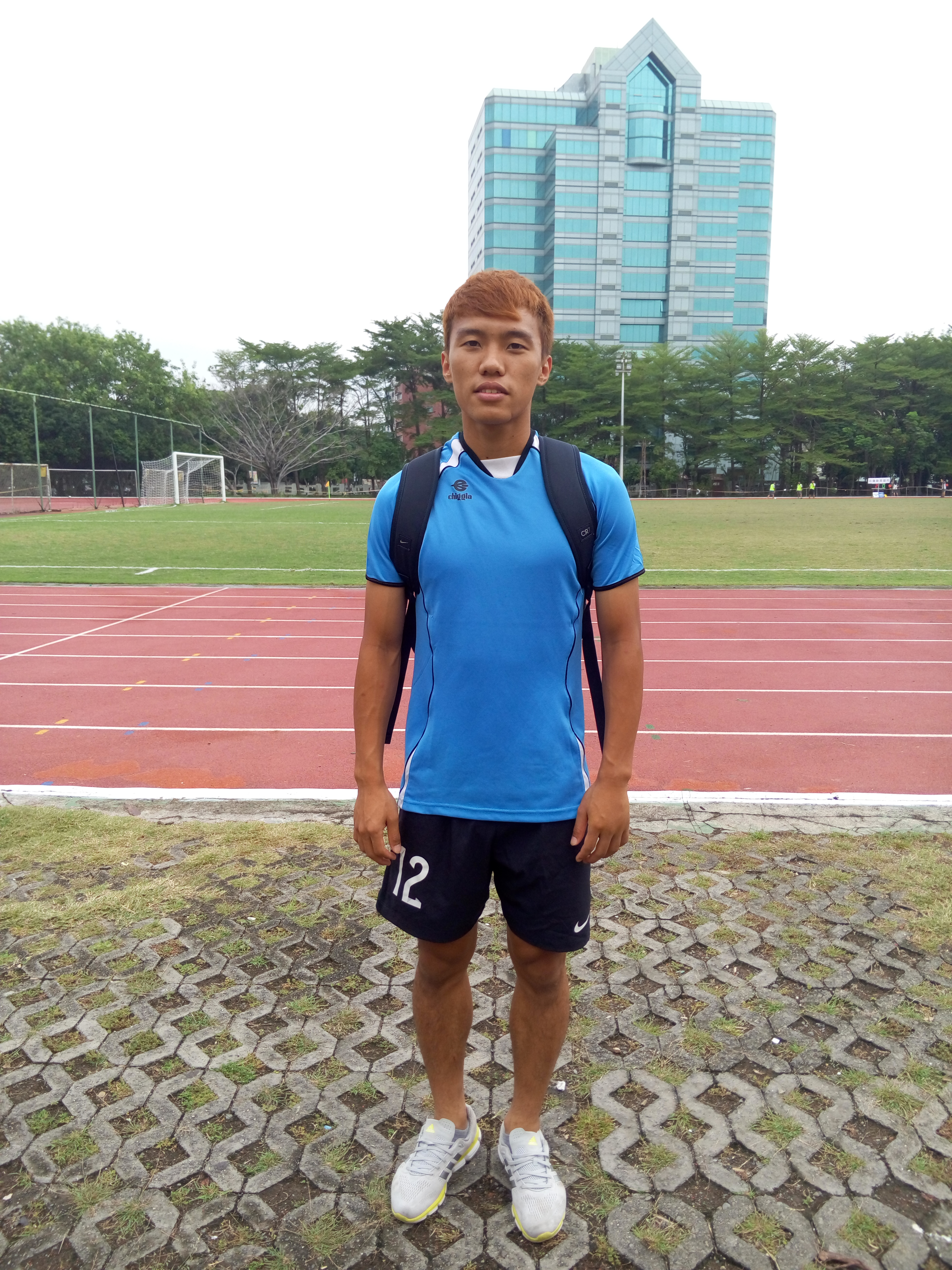
- Chen in 2015

Personal information
- Date of birth: 22 June 1995 (age 31)
- Place of birth: Taichung, Taiwan
- Height: 1.77 m (5 ft 10 in)
- Position: Forward

Senior career*
Years	Team	Apps	(Gls)
2012–2014	National Taiwan Sport University		
2015–2016	Hunan Billows	13	(0)
2018	National Sports Training Center F.C.		
2019	Taichung FUTURO	20	(6)

International career^{‡}
2015–	Chinese Taipei	13	(3)
- * Club domestic league appearances and goals ‡ National team caps and goals as of 27 August 2019

Chen Chao-an (Chinese: 陳昭安; pinyin: Chén Zhāo'ān; born 22 June 1995) is a Taiwanese footballer who currently plays as a striker for the Chinese Taipei national football team.

== International career ==
=== International goals ===
Scores and results list Chinese Taipei's goal tally first.

No	Date	Venue	Opponent	Score	Result	Competition
1.	19 March 2016	Taipei Municipal Stadium, Tapei, Taiwan	Guam	1–0	3–2	Friendly
2.	9 November 2016	Mong Kok Stadium, Mong Kok, Hong Kong	Hong Kong	2–4	2–4	2017 EAFF E-1 Football Championship qualification
3.	10 June 2017	Jalan Besar Stadium, Kallang, Singapore	Singapore	2–1	2–1	2019 AFC Asian Cup qualification
4.	29 August 2019	National Stadium, Kaohsiung, Taiwan	Guam	2–0	3–0	Friendly
