= Chen Hao-wei =

Taiwanese footballer

Chen Hao-wei 陳浩瑋
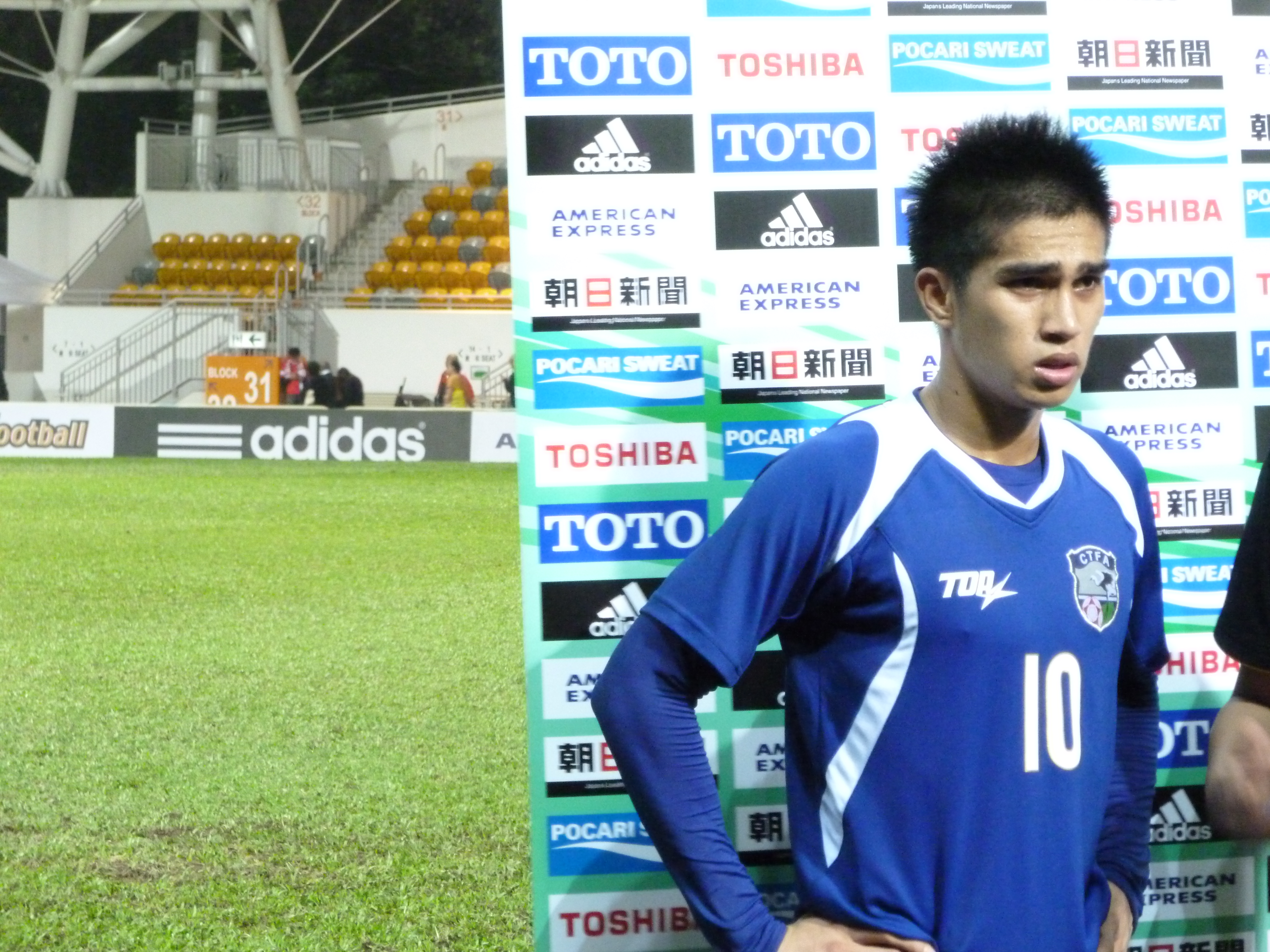

Personal information
- Full name: Chen Hao-wei
- Date of birth: 30 April 1992 (age 34)
- Place of birth: Hualien, Taiwan
- Height: 1.70 m (5 ft 7 in)
- Positions: Winger; center forward

Team information
- Current team: Shijiazhuang Gongfu (on loan from Ningbo FC)
- Number: 38

Youth career
- 2004–2007: Mei Lun Junior High School
- 2007–2010: National Hualien Agricultural High School
- 2009–2010: → Mogi Mirim (loan)

Senior career*
Years	Team	Apps	(Gls)
2011	Taipei PEC		
2012–2018	Beijing Enterprises	100	(12)
2019	Hang Yuen	9	(4)
2019–2020	Eastern	9	(0)
2021–2023	Taichung Futuro	29	(3)
2023	Dongguan United	15	(3)
2024–2025	Qingdao Red Lions	49	(6)
2026–	Ningbo FC	3	(0)
2026–	→ Shijiazhuang Gongfu (loan)	2	(0)

International career^{‡}
2011	Chinese Taipei U-23	2	(0)
2011–	Chinese Taipei	56	(8)
- * Club domestic league appearances and goals as of 14 November 2026 ‡ National team caps and goals as of 13 November 2026

Chen Hao-wei (Chinese: 陳浩瑋; pinyin: Chén Hàowěi; born 30 April 1992) is a Taiwanese professional footballer who currently plays as a center forward for China League One club Shijiazhuang Gongfu, on loan from Ningbo FC, and the Chinese Taipei national team.

== Club career ==
=== Eastern ===
On 17 July 2019, Eastern unveiled Chen as one of their newest players. He signed a two-year contract with the club.On 11 December 2020, Chen left the club.

=== China League One ===
On 23 July 2026, Chen was loaned to China League One side Shijiazhuang Gongfu.

== Honours ==
Eastern

- Hong Kong Senior Shield: 2019–20
- Hong Kong FA Cup: 2019–20

== Personal life ==
Chen is a member of the Amis people hailing from Fenglin Township and is also fluently speaks the native language in addition to Chinese. He is also a Christian who thanks his family and God for success.

== Career statistics ==
=== Club ===
Statistics accurate as of match played 11 December 2020.

Club performance			League		Cup		League Cup		Continental		Total	
Season	Club	League	Apps	Goals	Apps	Goals	Apps	Goals	Apps	Goals	Apps	Goals
Chinese Taipei			League		Cup		League Cup		Asia		Total	
2011	Taipei PEC	Intercity Football League			-		-		-			
China PR			League		FA Cup		CSL Cup		Asia		Total	
2012	Beijing Baxy/Beijing Enterprises	China League One	17	4	1	1	-		-		18	5
2013	Beijing Baxy/Beijing Enterprises	China League One	13	0	0	0	-		-		13	0
2014	Beijing Baxy/Beijing Enterprises	China League One	9	0	1	0	-		-		10	0
2015	Beijing Baxy/Beijing Enterprises	China League One	18	4	6	0	-		-		24	4
2016	Beijing Baxy/Beijing Enterprises	China League One	24	2	2	1	-		-		26	3
2017	Beijing Baxy/Beijing Enterprises	China League One	15	2	1	0	-		-		16	2
2018	Beijing Baxy/Beijing Enterprises	China League One	4	0	1	0	-		-		5	0
Chinese Taipei			League		Cup		League Cup		Asia		Total	
2019	Hang Yuen	Taiwan Premier League	9	4	-		-		0	0	9	4
Hong Kong			League		FA Cup		Senior Shield & Sapling Cup		Asia		Total	
2019–20	Eastern	Hong Kong Premier League	8	0	3	1	5	2	-		16	3
2020–21	Eastern	Hong Kong Premier League	1	0	0	0	1	0	0	0	2	0
Chinese Taipei			League		Cup		League Cup		Asia		Total	
2021	Taichung Futuro	Taiwan Premier League	0	0	-		-		-		0	0
Total	Chinese Taipei		9	4	0	0	0	0	6	0	9	4
Total	China PR		100	12	12	2	0	0	0	0	112	14
Total	Hong Kong		9	0	3	1	6	2	0	0	18	3
Career total			118	16	15	3	6	2	6	0	139	21

=== International ===
As of match played 14 December 2024

National team	Year	Apps	Goals
Chinese Taipei	2011	4	0
Chinese Taipei	2012	4	1
Chinese Taipei	2014	3	1
Chinese Taipei	2015	8	2
Chinese Taipei	2016	7	1
Chinese Taipei	2017	8	1
Chinese Taipei	2018	8	0
Chinese Taipei	2019	7	2
Chinese Taipei	2023	1	0
Chinese Taipei	2024	5	0
Chinese Taipei	2025	0	0
Total		55	8

Scores and results list Chinese Taipei's goal tally first.

List of international goals scored by Chen Hao-wei
No.	Date	Venue	Opponent	Score	Result	Competition
1.	1 December 2012	Mong Kok Stadium, Mong Kok, Hong Kong	North Korea	1–5	1–6	2013 EAFF East Asian Cup qualification
2.	13 November 2014	Taipei Municipal Stadium, Taipei, Taiwan	Guam	1–2	1–2	2015 EAFF East Asian Cup qualification
3.	9 October 2015	Taipei Municipal Stadium, Taipei, Taiwan	Macau	2–1	5–1	Friendly
4.	9 October 2015	Taipei Municipal Stadium, Taipei, Taiwan	Macau	5–1	5–1	Friendly
5.	11 October 2016	National Stadium, Kaohsiung, Taiwan	Timor-Leste	2–0	2–1	2019 AFC Asian Cup qualification
6.	5 October 2017	Taipei Municipal Stadium, Taipei, Taiwan	Mongolia	1–1	4–2	Friendly
7.	11 June 2019	Mong Kok Stadium, Mong Kok, Hong Kong	Hong Kong	1–0	2–0	Friendly
8.	11 June 2019	Mong Kok Stadium, Mong Kok, Hong Kong	Hong Kong	2–0	2–0	Friendly
