= Vom Ca-nhum =

East Timorese-Taiwanese footballer and manager

Vom Ca-nhum 王家中
Personal information
- Full name: Vom Ca-nhum
- Date of birth: 1965 (age 60–61)
- Place of birth: Portuguese Timor

Managerial career
- Years: Team
- 2018–2019: Chinese Taipei U-19
- 2018–2019: Chinese Taipei (caretaker)
- 2019–2020: Shanxi Metropolis
- 2020–2021: Chinese Taipei
- 2020–2022: Taichung Futuro
- 2023–2024: Rangers

Vom Ca-nhum (Chinese: 王家中; born 1965) is a Taiwanese football manager and former professional footballer.

== Early life ==
Vom was born to a Taiwanese father and an East Timorese mother.

== Managerial career ==
In 2019, Vom was appointed manager of Shanxi Metropolis, becoming the first Taiwanese manager to coach a Chinese team.

In February 2020, Vom was appointed as Chinese Taipei head coach, having been one of only a small number of coaches on the island with an AFC Pro A coaching license.

In July 2020, Vom succeeded Toshiaki Imai as manager of Taiwan Football Premier League team Taichung Futuro.

On 13 May 2023, Rangers director Philip Lee announced that Vom would be the head coach of the club for 2023–24 AFC Champions League matches in order to fulfil AFC License requirements. The AFC mandates that all head coaches in the Champions League carry an AFC Pro License.

On 7 July 2023, it was announced that Vom would be the head coach of Rangers for the entire 2023–24 season.

== Managerial statistics ==
As of match played 15 June 2021

Managerial record by team and tenure
Team	From	To	Record					Ref.
Team	From	To	P	W	D	L	Win %	Ref.
Chinese Taipei U19	1 October 2018	3 April 2019	3	0	0	3	0.0	
Shanxi Longjin F.C.	4 April 2019	6 May 2019	4	0	1	3	0.0	
Chinese Taipei	14 February 2020	2 October 2021	3	0	0	3	0.0	
Tong Jie FC	1 July 2020	18 July 2020	1	0	0	1	0.0	
Taichung Futuro F.C.	19 July 2020	Present	10	6	0	4	60.0	
Total			22	7	1	14	31.8	—
