= Hung Tzu-kuei =

Taiwanese footballer (born 1993)

Personal information
- Date of birth: 1 June 1993 (age 33)
- Place of birth: Taichung, Taiwan
- Height: 1.83 m (6 ft 0 in)
- Position: Defender

Team information
- Current team: CPC Corporation

Senior career*
Years	Team	Apps	(Gls)
2015–2019	Hasus TSU		
2019–2020	Taichung Futuro	41	(4)
2021–	CPC Corporation	0	(0)

International career^{‡}
2016–	Chinese Taipei	14	(0)
- * Club domestic league appearances and goals ‡ National team caps and goals as of 28 August 2019

Hung Tzu-kuei (Chinese: 洪子貴; born 1 June 1993) is a Taiwanese footballer who currently plays as a defender for Taiwanese club CPC Corporation and the Chinese Taipei national football team.

== Life and club career ==
Hung is of Paiwan background. He studied at Kaohsiung's Alian Junior High School and Lujhu Senior High. After leaving school, he joined the army for family reason, even though he was offered a place at the National Taiwan University of Sport. However, he decided that the army life is not for him, and returned to study at the University and joined the football team of the university.

He joined Taichung Futuro in 2019.

== International career ==
Hung had been previously selected for U19 national team.

Hung made his senior international debut for Chinese Taipei on October 8, 2016, in a 2019 Asian Cup qualifying play-off match against Timor-Leste.
