= Chao Ming-hsiu =

Taiwanese footballer

Personal information
- Date of birth: 9 July 1997 (age 29)
- Place of birth: Taichung, Taiwan
- Height: 1.77 m (5 ft 10 in)
- Position: Midfielder

Team information
- Current team: Taipower

Senior career*
Years	Team	Apps	(Gls)
–2016	NTUPES		
2017	NSTC		
2018–2019	NTUPES		
2019–2020	Futuro	19	(1)
2021–	Taipower		

International career^{‡}
2017–	Chinese Taipei	10	(0)
- * Club domestic league appearances and goals ‡ National team caps and goals as of 13 November 2026

Chao Ming-hsiu (Chinese: 趙明修; born 9 July 1997) is a Taiwanese footballer who plays as a midfielder for Taipower and the Chinese Taipei national team.

== Career ==
In 2018, Chao after trialed for Japanese side FC Ryukyu. In 2019, he trialed for Cova da Piedade in Portugal.

== International goals ==
No.	Date	Venue	Opponent	Score	Result	Competition
1.	28 September 2015	Rajamangala Stadium, Bangkok, Thailand	Northern Mariana Islands	5–0	10–0	2016 AFC U-19 Championship qualification
2.	28 September 2015	Rajamangala Stadium, Bangkok, Thailand	Northern Mariana Islands	6–0	10–0	2016 AFC U-19 Championship qualification
