= Tu Shao-chieh =

Taiwanese footballer

Personal information
- Full name: Tu Shao-chieh
- Date of birth: 2 January 1999 (age 27)
- Place of birth: Taipei, Taiwan
- Position: Defender

Team information
- Current team: Taipower

Senior career*
Years	Team	Apps	(Gls)
2018–2020	Ming Chuan University		
2021	AC Taipei	5	(1)
2021–2022	Taichung Futuro	22	(0)
2023–	Taipower	0	(0)

International career^{‡}
2018–2020	Chinese Taipei U20	2	(0)
2018	Chinese Taipei U23	3	(0)
2018–	Chinese Taipei	14	(0)
- * Club domestic league appearances and goals as of 1 September 2023 ‡ National team caps and goals as of 13 November 2026

Tu Shao-chieh (born 2 January 1999) is a Taiwanese professional soccer player who plays as a defender for Taipower and the Chinese Taipei national team.

== International goals ==
No.	Date	Venue	Opponent	Score	Result	Competition
1.	8 November 2017	Hsinchu County Second Stadium, Zhubei, Taiwan	Macau	1–0	2–0	2018 AFC U-19 Championship qualification
