= Jhon Benchy =

Taiwanese footballer (born 1994)

Jhon Benchy 約翰·班奇
Personal information
- Full name: Jhon Miky Benchy Estama
- Date of birth: 14 June 1994 (age 32)
- Place of birth: Anse-à-Galets, Haiti
- Height: 1.69 m (5 ft 7 in)
- Position: Forward

Team information
- Current team: Kaohsiung Attackers
- Number: 9

Youth career
- New York Red Bulls

Senior career*
Years	Team	Apps	(Gls)
2009–2011	Violette		
2011–2013	New York Red Bulls II	1	(0)
2013–2017	Don Bosco		
2017	Cibao		
2017–2018	Don Bosco		
2018	Violette		
2019	Hang Yuan		
2020–2022	Tainan City	33	(24)
2022–2024	Taichung Futuro	31	(27)
2024	Taipei Vikings	6	(3)
2024–2025	Hang Yuan	11	(7)
2025	→ Tainan City (loan)		
2025–2026	Tainan City	19	(10)
2026–	Kaohsiung Attackers		

International career^{‡}
2010–2011	Haiti U17	2	(0)
2013	Haiti U20	2	(0)
2015	Haiti U23	2	(0)
2024–	Chinese Taipei	9	(1)
- * Club domestic league appearances and goals as of 13 July 2026 ‡ National team caps and goals as of 13 November 2026

Jhon Miky Benchy Estama (Chinese: 約翰·米基·班奇·埃斯塔馬; born 14 June 1994) is a professional footballer who plays as a forward for Taiwan Football Premier League club Kaohsiung Attackers. Besides Haiti, he has played in Dominican Republic and Taiwan. Born in Haiti, he plays for the Chinese Taipei national team. He previously represented Haiti at age-limited international levels.

== Club career ==
At the age of 15, Benchy signed for Haitian top flight side Violette, where they suffered relegation to the Haitian second division. After that, he joined the youth academy of the New York Red Bulls in the United States. In 2015, he trained with a Belgian team.

In 2017, Benchy signed for Dominican Republic club Cibao. After that, he signed for Don Bosco. Before the 2019 season, Estama signed for Hang Yuen in Taiwan, where he was top scorer. Before the 2020 season, he left Hang Yuen. After that, he signed for Taiwan Steel, helping them win the league. Before the 2022 season, he signed for Taichung Futuro.

== International career ==
Benchy was a Haiti youth international, but refused to represent senior team internationally, due to not wanting to be used as a political tool. Having played in Taiwan for the last five years, Benchy became eligible to represent Chinese Taipei and was called up to the centralised training camp in September 2024.

== International goals ==
No.	Date	Venue	Opponent	Score	Result	Competition
1.	11 December 2024	Mong Kok Stadium, Mong Kok, Hong Kong	Mongolia	2–0	4–0	2025 EAFF E-1 Football Championship
