= Keisuke Ogawa =

Japanese footballer

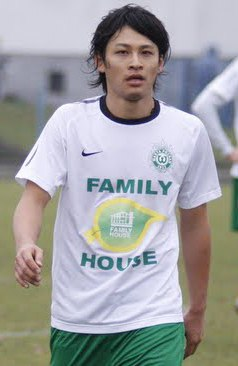
- Keisuke Ogawa on trial at Poland club, Warta Poznań

Personal information
- Full name: Keisuke Ogawa
- Date of birth: 5 September 1986 (age 40)
- Place of birth: Itami, Japan
- Height: 1.78 m (5 ft 10 in)
- Positions: Midfielder; defender

Team information
- Current team: Taichung Futuro
- Number: 7

Senior career*
Years	Team	Apps	(Gls)
2004–2007	Kobe FC		
2007–2010	Albirex Niigata Singapore		
2010–2012	Pattaya United		
2013	Jūrmala		
2013	Sloboda Užice		
2014	Liepāja		
2014	Chiangrai United		
2015	PKNS		
2016–2017	Yadanarbon		
2018	Sabah		
2019–	Taichung Futuro	96	(1)
- * Club domestic league appearances and goals as of 25 May 2026

Keisuke Ogawa (Japanese: 小川圭佑; born 5 September 1986) is a Japanese footballer, who plays for Taichung Futuro.

== Career ==
Born in Itami, Japan, Ogawa played for Kobe FC in the Japanese regional league after graduating from Hannan University prior to joining Albirex Niigata Singapore where he played between 2007 and 2010.

In 2010 he joined Pattaya United in the Thai Premier League where he played until the end of 2012.

During the winter break of the 2012–13 season he moved to Europe and joined FC Jūrmala. He quickly became a regular and made 9 appearances with Jurmala in the 2013 Latvian Higher League before leaving the club in summer. He came along with Shohei Okuno to Serbia and after a successful trial period they both signed with FK Sloboda Užice. But he failed to make an appearance during the six months at the club and left during the winter transfer window.
