= Chen Ting-yang =

Taiwanese footballer (born 1992)

Chen Ting-Yang 陳庭揚
Personal information
- Full name: Chen Ting-Yang
- Date of birth: 28 September 1992 (age 34)
- Place of birth: Hualien, Taiwan
- Height: 1.80 m (5 ft 11 in)
- Positions: Defender; midfielder

Team information
- Current team: Taichung Futuro
- Number: 3

Senior career*
Years	Team	Apps	(Gls)
2010–2015	Taiwan University of Sport		
2015–2016	National Sports Training Center		
2016–2017	Taiwan University of Sport		
2017–2019	Taipower		
2019	Lee Man	1	(0)
2019–	Taichung Futuro	107	(8)

International career^{‡}
2013–	Chinese Taipei	61	(5)
2018	Chinese Taipei U23 (WC)	3	(0)
- * Club domestic league appearances and goals as of 25 May 2026 ‡ National team caps and goals as of 13 November 2026

Chen Ting-Yang (Chinese: 陳庭揚; born 28 September 1992) is a Taiwanese footballer who currently plays as a midfielder or a defender for Taiwan Football Premier League club Taichung Futuro and the Chinese Taipei national team.

== International career ==
=== International goals ===
Scores and results list Chinese Taipei's goal tally first.

No.	Date	Venue	Opponent	Score	Result	Competition
1.	3 December 2017	Taipei Municipal Stadium, Taipei, Chinese Taipei	Philippines	3–0	3–0	2017 CTFA International Tournament
2.	4 December 2017	Taipei Municipal Stadium, Taipei, Chinese Taipei	Timor-Leste	2–1	3–1	2017 CTFA International Tournament
3.	11 November 2018	Taipei Municipal Stadium, Taipei, Chinese Taipei	Hong Kong	1–1	1–2	2019 EAFF E-1 Football Championship qualification
4.	16 June 2023	National Stadium, Kaohsiung, Taiwan	Thailand	2–2	4–0	Friendly
5.	12 October 2023	National Stadium, Kaohsiung, Taiwan	Timor-Leste	2–0	4–0	2026 FIFA World Cup qualification

== Honours ==
=== Club ===
Lee Man

- Hong Kong Sapling Cup: 2018–19
