= National Taiwan University of Sport F.C. =

Taiwanese football club

Land Home NTUS
- Full name: National Taiwan University of Sport Football Team
- Nickname: NTUS
- Founded: 1996; 30 years ago
- Coach: Chao Jung-jui
- 2023: 2nd of 8
Home colours	Away colours

National Taiwan University of Sport Football Team (Chinese: 臺體大男子足球隊), is a university-made football club based in Taichung, Taiwan, attached to National Taiwan University of Sport. The team had played in CTFA league system until 2023, in which they transferred their playing spot to Taichung Rock in 2024.

== 2023 squad ==
Note: Flags indicate national team as defined under FIFA eligibility rules; some limited exceptions apply. Players may hold more than one non-FIFA nationality.

No.	Pos.	Nation	Player
1	MF	TPE	Huang Huai-hsien
2	MF	TPE	Cheng Kai-yi
6	MF	TPE	Lin Chia-le
7	MF	TPE	Lin Shih-chieh
9	FW	TPE	Liang Hao-teng
10	MF	TPE	Chiang Chun-yao
12	MF	TPE	Huang Yu-po
13	MF	TPE	Hsueh Jen-yu
14	DF	TPE	Liu Chun-yu
15	MF	TPE	Wang Tzu-chun
16	MF	TPE	Sun En-chi
17	MF	TPE	Hsu Tzu-yu
18	MF	TPE	Shih Ching-tang

No.	Pos.	Nation	Player
20	MF	TPE	Lu En-wei
21	MF	TPE	Ko Yueh-ting
22	MF	TPE	Lin Cheng-jui
23	MF	TPE	Li Yu-lin
26	FW	TPE	Li Wei-lun
27	MF	TPE	Yen Chen-wei
30	MF	TPE	Hsu Hung-ming
35	MF	TPE	Li Hung-chun
37	MF	PAR	Alessandro Espillaga
39	MF	TPE	Chen Po-ying
42	MF	TPE	Chen Chih-wei
44	DF	TPE	Chen Po-wei
-	GK	TPE	Tsai Yu-hsiang

== League records ==
=== Year-by-year ===
Season	Team name	League											Position	International/Continental	
Season	Team name	Div	League	Pld	W	D	L	GF	GA	GD	Pts	PPG	Position	International/Continental	
1997	Taiwan Physical Education College	1	National League	14	6	3	5	19	15	+4	21	1.50	3rd	Did not qualify	
1998	Taiwan Physical Education College	1	National League										3rd	Did not qualify	
1999	Taiwan Physical Education College	1	National League										4th	Did not qualify	
2000–01	Wei Dan	1	National League	12	6	1	5	27	15	+12	19	1.58	3rd	Did not qualify	
2004	Taiwan Physical Education College	1	National League										4th	Did not qualify	
2005	Taiwan Physical Education College	1	National League	14	7	1	6	27	23	+4	22	1.57	5th	Did not qualify	
2008	Molten Tso I	1	Enterprise League	14	10	0	4	31	8	+23	30	2.14	3rd	Did not qualify	
2008	Chia Cheng Hsin	1	Intercity League	10	6	1	3	32	12	+20	19	1.90	2nd	Did not qualify	
2009	Kaohsiung City Yoedy	1	Intercity League	15	11	1	3	44	14	+30	34	2.27	1st	Did not qualify	
2010	Hasus TSU	1	Intercity League	13	6	1	6	39	16	+23	19	1.46	5th	AFC President's Cup	GS
2011	Hasus TSU	1	Intercity League	12	6	2	4	40	27	+13	20	1.67	3rd	Did not qualify	
2012	National Taiwan University of Physical Education	1	Intercity League	12	5	2	5	28	23	+5	17	1.42	4th	Did not qualify	
2013	Taichung City Dragon	1	Intercity League	14	10	1	3	44	14	+30	31	2.21	3rd	Did not qualify	
2014	Taichung	1	Intercity League	14	8	3	3	52	14	+38	27	1.93	3rd	Did not qualify	
2015–16	National Taiwan University of Sport	1	Intercity League	14	8	3	3	41	17	+24	27	1.93	3rd	Did not qualify	
2017	NTUS Opotech	1	TPFL	28	13	6	9	46	36	+10	45	1.61	3rd	Did not qualify	
2018	NTUS Opotech	1	TFPL	21	8	5	8	49	38	+11	29	1.38	4th	Did not qualify	
2019	National Taiwan University of Sport	1	TFPL	21	4	3	14	23	59	-36	15	0.71	6th	Did not qualify	
2020	Land Home NTUS	1	TFPL	21	6	2	13	27	50	-23	20	0.95	6th	Did not qualify	
2021	Land Home NTUS	1	TFPL	14	1	2	11	8	41	–33	5	0.36	8th	Did not qualify	
2022	Land Home NTUS	2	Division 2	14	11	2	1	52	12	+40	35	2.50	2nd	Did not qualify	
2023	Land Home NTUS	2	Division 2	10	6	3	1	30	11	+19	21	2.10	2nd	Did not qualify	
Total	—	—	—	—	—	—	—	—	—	—	—	—	—	—	—

=== International competition ===
Season	Competition	Round	Club	Home	Away	Aggregate	Ref.
2010	AFC President's Cup	Group A	(Kyrgyzstan) Dordoi-Dynamo	0–5		4th out of 4	
2010	AFC President's Cup	Group A	(Bangladesh) Abahani Limited	0–0		4th out of 4	
2010	AFC President's Cup	Group A	(Nepal) New Road Team	3–4		4th out of 4	

== Honours ==
Type	Competition	Titles	Seasons
Domestic	Intercity Football League	1	2009
College	University Football Association	10	1997, 2000, 2005, 2006, 2007, 2008, 2009, 2015, 2022, 2024
