= Chinese Taipei national football team results =

- Win Draw Loss

This article details the fixtures and results of the Chinese Taipei national football team. (Note: The Chinese Taipei Football Association joined FIFA in 1954 and originally entered a national team under the name Taiwan. In 1982, the national team was renamed Chinese Taipei. For results prior to 1982, see Taiwan national football team results.)

== 2020s ==
=== 2026 ===
11 November 2026 Casper Cup	Vietnam	2–0	Chinese Taipei	Ninh Bình, Vietnam
19:00 UTC+7	Olaha Mạnh Đức 21'; Nguyễn Đình Bắc 58'	Report		Stadium: Thiên Trường Stadium; Referee: Nawal Zubir (Malaysia)

31 March 2027 AFC Asian Cup Q	Chinese Taipei	1–3	Sri Lanka	Taipei, Taiwan
18:30 UTC+8	Yu Yao-hsing 55'	Report; Report (AFC)	Suresh 18'; Senthurvasan 26'; Tiao 53' (o.g.)	Stadium: Taipei Municipal Stadium; Attendance: 1,556; Referee: Jansen Foo (Singapore)

=== 2025 ===
25 March 2027 AFC Asian Cup Q	Chinese Taipei	1–2	Turkmenistan	Kaohsiung, Taiwan
18:30 UTC+8	Ange Kouamé 48'	Report	Elman Tagayev 64'; Yazgylych Gurbanov 83'	Stadium: National Stadium; Attendance: 1,897; Referee: Abdulhadi Al-Ruaile (Qatar)

5 June Friendly	Macau	0–2	Chinese Taipei	Taipei, Taiwan
		Report

10 June 2027 AFC Asian Cup Q	Sri Lanka	3–1	Chinese Taipei	Colombo, Sri Lanka
15:45 UTC+5:30	Rajamohan 49'; De Silva 53'; Razeek 59'	Report; Report (AFC)	Huang Wei-chieh 70'	Stadium: Colombo Racecourse; Attendance: 3,710; Referee: Daniel Elder (Australia)

5 September Friendly	Indonesia	6–0	Chinese Taipei	Surabaya, Indonesia
20:30 UTC+7	Amat 4'; Chao Ming-hsiu 23' (o.g.); Klok 33'; Reijnders 38'; Sananta 58'; Walsh 60'	Report		Stadium: Gelora Bung Tomo Stadium; Referee: Ryo Tanimoto (Japan)

9 October 2027 AFC Asian Cup Q	Thailand	2–0	Chinese Taipei	Bangkok, Thailand
19:30 UTC+7	Seksan 51'; Chanathip 78'	Report; Report (AFC)		Stadium: Rajamangala Stadium; Attendance: 13,970; Referee: Amir Arab Baraghi (Iran)

14 October 2027 AFC Asian Cup Q	Chinese Taipei	1–6	Thailand	Taipei, Taiwan
2026-11-12 07:32 UTC	Kuo Po-wei 46'	Report; Report (AFC)	Teerasak 4', 62', 76'; Seksan 25'; Supachok 45+1'; Huang Tzu-ming 90+3' (o.g.)	Stadium: Taipei Municipal Stadium; Attendance: 4,563; Referee: Omar Al Yaqoubi (Oman)

18 November 2027 AFC Asian Cup Q	Turkmenistan	3–1	Chinese Taipei	Arkadag, Turkmenistan
18:45 UTC+5	Myratberdiýew 13'; Tagaýew 53'; Diniýew 78'	Report; Report (AFC)	Kouamé 45+2'	Stadium: Arkadag Stadium; Attendance: 10,000; Referee: Yousif Saeed Hasan (Iraq)

=== 2024 ===
14 December 2025 EAFF E-1 Preliminary	Hong Kong	2–1	Chinese Taipei	Mong Kok, Hong Kong
20:00 UTC+8	Orr 19'; Tsui Wang Kit 87'	Report	Yu Yao-hsing 29'	Stadium: Mong Kok Stadium; Attendance: 5,637; Referee: Chae Sang-hyeop (South Korea)

11 December 2025 EAFF E-1 Preliminary	Chinese Taipei	4–0	Mongolia	Mong Kok, Hong Kong
20:00 UTC+8	Kouamé 42', 83'; Estama 59'; Yu Yao-hsing 76'	Report		Stadium: Mong Kok Stadium; Attendance: 892; Referee: Du Jianxin (China)

18 November Friendly	Singapore	2–3	Chinese Taipei	Kallang, Singapore
20:00 UTC+8	Irfan 86'; Shawal 90+3'	Report	Tiao 22'; Sandberg 79'; Kouamé 90+1'	Stadium: National Stadium; Attendance: 6,764; Referee: Sami Ahmed Aljurays (Saudi Arabia)

11 October Friendly	Cambodia	3–2	Chinese Taipei	Phnom Penh, Cambodia
19:00 UTC+7	Ratanak 48', 88'; Chanthea 62'	Report	Ogawa 44' (o.g.); Chen 83'	Stadium: Phnom Penh Olympic Stadium

11 June 2026 World Cup qualification	Malaysia	3–1	Chinese Taipei	Kuala Lumpur, Malaysia
21:00 UTC+8	Safawi 53'; Paulo Josué 69'; Adib 90+6'	Report	Yu Yao-hsing 20'	Stadium: Bukit Jalil National Stadium; Attendance: 14,731; Referee: Abdullah Jamali (Kuwait)

6 June 2026 World Cup qualification	Chinese Taipei	0–3	Oman	Taipei, Taiwan
19:00 UTC+8		Report	Al-Mushaifri 31', 55'; Al-Yahmadi 75'	Stadium: Taipei Municipal Stadium; Attendance: 5,700; Referee: Zaid Thamer Mohammed (Iraq)

26 March 2026 World Cup qualification	Kyrgyzstan	5–1	Chinese Taipei	Bishkek, Kyrgyzstan
20:00 UTC+6	Kojo 17', 38', 45'; Brauzman 79'; Ki. Merk 90+5'	Report	Wu Yen-shu 87' (pen.)	Stadium: Dolen Omurzakov Stadium; Attendance: 13,657; Referee: Ammar Mahfoodh (Bahrain)

21 March 2026 World Cup qualification	Chinese Taipei	0–2	Kyrgyzstan	Kaohsiung, Taiwan
14:00 UTC+6		Report	Kichin 54' (pen.); Ka. Merk 80'	Stadium: Nanzih Football Stadium; Attendance: 1,028; Referee: Yahya Al-Mulla (United Arab Emirates)

=== 2023 ===
21 November 2026 World Cup qualification	Chinese Taipei	0–1	Malaysia	Taipei, Taiwan
19:00 UTC+8		Report	Darren Lok 72'	Stadium: Taipei Municipal Stadium, Attendance: 9,521; Referee: Majed Al-Shamrani (Saudi Arabia)

16 November 2026 World Cup qualification	Oman	3–0	Chinese Taipei	Muscat, Oman
19:00 UTC+4	Al-Malki 17'; Pan Wen-Chieh 41' (o.g.); Saleh 90+1'	Report		Stadium: Sultan Qaboos Sports Complex; Attendance: 4,155; Referee: Sadullo Gulmurodi (Tajikistan)

17 October 2026 World Cup qualification	Timor-Leste	0–3 (0–7 agg.)	Chinese Taipei	Kaohsiung, Taiwan
19:00		Report	Yu Chia-Huang 18'; Wu Yen-Shu 21'; Kouamé 24'	Stadium: National Stadium; Attendance: 745; Referee: Tejas Nagvenkar (India)

12 October 2026 World Cup qualification	Chinese Taipei	4–0	Timor-Leste	Kaohsiung, Taiwan
19:00	Yu Yao-Hsing 4', 60'; Chen Ting-Yang 57'; Ko Yu-Ting 88'	Report		Stadium: National Stadium; Attendance: 1,894; Referee: Ismaeel Habib Ali (Bahrain)

12 September Friendly	Singapore	3–1	Chinese Taipei	Bishan, Singapore
19:30 UTC+8	Song Ui-young 42' (pen.); Lionel Tan 65'; Shawal 81'	Report	Kouamé 29'	Stadium: Bishan Stadium; Attendance: 2,189; Referee: Pineda Mick Jon (Philippines)

8 September Friendly	Chinese Taipei	1–1	Philippines	Kaohsiung, Taiwan
19:30 UTC+8	Pai Shao-yu 90+4'	Report	Reichelt 18'	Stadium: National Stadium; Referee: Lê Vũ Linh (Vietnam)

19 June Friendly	Philippines	2–3	Chinese Taipei	Manila, Philippines
19:00 UTC+8	Ott 12' (pen.); Reichelt 39'	Report	Wu Yen-shu 2'; Yu Yao-hsing 57'; Lin Ming-wei 90'	Stadium: Rizal Memorial Stadium

16 June Friendly	Chinese Taipei	2–2	Thailand	Kaohsiung, Taiwan
19:00 UTC+8	Kaman 48' (o.g.); Chen Ting-Yang 87'		Dangda 62'; Wang Ruei 84' (og.)	Stadium: National Stadium; Attendance: 6,762; Referee: Liu Kwok Man (Hong Kong)

=== 2022 ===
14 December Friendly	Thailand	0–1	Chinese Taipei	Pathum Thani, Thailand
20:30 UTC+7			Chen Jui-Chieh 72'	Stadium: Thammasat Stadium; Referee: Mohd Amirul Izwan bin Yaacob (Malaysia)

=== 2021 ===
11 October 2021 2023 AFCQ PO	Chinese Taipei	0–3	Indonesia	Buriram, Thailand
20:00 UTC+8		Report	Egy 27'; Kambuaya 55'; Witan 90+3'	Stadium: Buriram Stadium; Attendance: 0 Referee: Mohammad Arafah (Jordan)

7 October 2021 2023 AFCQ PO	Indonesia	2–1	Chinese Taipei	Buriram, Thailand
19:00 UTC+7	Rumakiek 16'; Evan Dimas 48'	Report	Hsu Heng-Pin 90'	Stadium: Buriram Stadium; Attendance: 0 Referee: Payam Heydari (Iran)

3 June 2021 2022 FIFA World Cup qualification – AFC second round	Nepal	2–0	Chinese Taipei	Kuwait City, Kuwait
19:00 UTC+3	An. Bista 3' (pen.); N. Shrestha 80'	Report (FIFA); Report (AFC)		Stadium: Al Kuwait Sports Club Stadium; Referee: Kim Woo-sung (South Korea)

7 June 2021 2022 FIFA World Cup qualification – AFC second round	Australia	5–1	Chinese Taipei	Kuwait City, Kuwait
22:00 UTC+3	Souttar 12'; Maclaren 27' (pen.); Sainsbury 41'; Duke 46', 84'	Report (FIFA); Report (AFC)	Gao Wei-jie 62'	Stadium: Jaber Al-Ahmad International Stadium; Referee: Saoud Al-Adba (Qatar)

15 June 2021 2022 FIFA World Cup qualification – AFC second round	Chinese Taipei	1–2	Kuwait	Kuwait City, Kuwait
22:00 UTC+3	Wu Chun-ching 51'	Report (FIFA); Report (AFC)	Nasser 14', 71'	Stadium: Jaber Al-Ahmad International Stadium; Referee: Ahmed Al-Kaf (Oman)

== 2010s ==
=== 2019 ===
19 March 2019 Friendly	Myanmar	0–0	Chinese Taipei	Mandalay, Myanmar
19:00 UTC+6:30				Stadium: Mandalarthiri Stadium

24 March 2019 Friendly	Chinese Taipei	0–1	Solomon Islands	Taipei, Taiwan
18:00			Totori 39' (pen.)	Stadium: Taipei Municipal Stadium; Attendance: 2,398

6 June 2019 Friendly	Chinese Taipei	1–1	Nepal	Kaohsiung, Taiwan
19:00 (UTC+8)	Wu Chun-ching 40'		Rijal 69'	Stadium: National Stadium

11 June 2019 Friendly	Hong Kong	0–2	Chinese Taipei	Hong Kong
20:00 (UTC+8)		Report	Chen Hao-wei 35', 45+2'	Stadium: Mong Kok Stadium; Attendance: 2,421; Referee: Kim Woo-sung (South Korea)

5 September 2019 2022 WCQ R2	Chinese Taipei	1–2	Jordan	Taipei, Taiwan
19:10 UTC+8	Wen Chih-hao 81'	Report (FIFA); Report (AFC)	Faisal 19'; Samir 37'	Stadium: Taipei Municipal Stadium; Attendance: 5,520; Referee: Yusuke Araki (Japan)

10 September 2019 2022 WCQ R2	Chinese Taipei	0–2	Nepal	Taipei, Taiwan
19:10 UTC+8		Report (FIFA); Report (AFC)	Bista 4', 62'	Stadium: Taipei Municipal Stadium; Attendance: 4,780; Referee: Yaqoob Abdul Baki (Oman)

15 October 2019 2022 WCQ R2	Chinese Taipei	1–7	Australia	Kaohsiung, Taiwan
19:10 UTC+8	Chen Yi-wei 21'	Report (FIFA); Report (AFC)	Taggart 12', 19'; Irvine 34', 37'; Maclaren 84'; Souttar 73', 89'	Stadium: National Stadium; Attendance: 3,251; Referee: Mongkolchai Pechsri (Thailand)

14 November 2019 2022 WCQ R2	Kuwait	9–0	Chinese Taipei	Kuwait City, Kuwait
19:00 UTC+3	Nasser 22', 59'; Al Ansari 42'; Al Faneeni 49'; Al-Mutawa 55'; Al-Harbi 62'; Al-Khaldi 73'; Chen Wei-chuan 77' (o.g.); Al-Azemi 73'	Report (FIFA); Report (AFC)		Stadium: Jaber Al-Ahmad International Stadium; Attendance: 7,500; Referee: Mohd Amirul Izwan Yaacob (Malaysia)

19 November 2019 2022 WCQ R2	Jordan	5–0	Chinese Taipei	Amman, Jordan
18:00 UTC+2	Faisal 4', 75'; Ersan 25'; Al-Arab 43'; Al-Dardour 62'	Report (FIFA); Report (AFC)		Stadium: King Abdullah II Stadium; Attendance: 2,289; Referee: Mohammed Abdulla Hassan Mohamed (United Arab Emirates)

=== 2018 ===
27 March 2018 2019 AFC Asian Cup qualification – third round	Chinese Taipei	1–0	Singapore	Taipei, Taiwan
19:00 UTC+8	Chen Po-liang 37'	Report		Stadium: Taipei Municipal Stadium; Attendance: 8,139; Referee: Pranjal Banerjee (India)

1 June 2018 2018 Hero Intercontinental Cup	India	5–0	Chinese Taipei	Mumbai, India
20:00 UTC+5:30	Chhetri 14', 34', 62'; U. Singh 48'; Halder 78'	Report		Stadium: Mumbai Football Arena; Attendance: 2,569; Referee: Nivon Robesh Gamini (Sri Lanka)

5 June 2018 2018 Hero Intercontinental Cup	Chinese Taipei	0–1	New Zealand	Mumbai, India
20:00 UTC+5:30		Report	Bevan 36' (pen.)	Stadium: Mumbai Football Arena; Referee: C. R. Srikrishna (India)

8 June 2018 2018 Hero Intercontinental Cup	Chinese Taipei	0–4	Kenya	Mumbai, India
20:00 UTC+5:30		Report	Odhiambo 52'; Atudo 55' (pen.), 88'; Otieno 70'	Stadium: Mumbai Football Arena, Mumbai; Referee: Santhosh Kumar (India)

7 September 2018 Friendly	Chinese Taipei	2–0	Malaysia	Taipei, Republic of China
19:00 UTC+8	Wu Chun-ching 13'; Chu En-le 53'	Report		Stadium: Taipei Municipal Stadium; Attendance: 3,688; Referee: Murad Al Zawahreh (Jordan)

11 November 2018 2019 EAFF E-1 Football Championship – Second Round	Chinese Taipei	1–2	Hong Kong	Taipei, Republic of China
18:10 UTC+8	Chen Ting-yang 81'	Report	McKee 65'; Chung Wai Keung 84'	Stadium: Taipei Municipal Stadium; Attendance: 1,793; Referee: Chae Sang-hyeop (South Korea)

13 November 2018 2019 EAFF E-1 Football Championship – Second Round	Chinese Taipei	2–1	Mongolia	Taipei, Republic of China
19:10 UTC+8	Chu En-Le 8', 10'	Report	Norjmoogiin Tsedenbal 62'	Stadium: Taipei Municipal Stadium; Attendance: 1,157; Referee: Razlan Joffri Ali (Malaysia)

16 November 2018 2019 EAFF E-1 Football Championship – Second Round	Chinese Taipei	0–2	North Korea	Taipei, Republic of China
19:10 UTC+8		Report	Jong Il-gwan 48'; Jang Kuk-chol 73'	Stadium: Taipei Municipal Stadium; Attendance: 2,016; Referee: Minoru Tōjō (Japan)

=== 2017 ===
22 March 2017 Friendly	Vietnam	1–1	Chinese Taipei	Hanoi, Vietnam
19:30 UTC+7	Nguyễn Công Phượng 89'		Lee Pin-hsien 84'	Stadium: Hàng Đẫy Stadium

26 March 2017 2019 AFC Asian Cup qualification – third round	Chinese Taipei	1–3	Turkmenistan	Taipei, Taiwan
18:07 UTC+8	Chen Po-liang 45+3' (pen.)		Annadurdyýew 23'; Mingazow 24'; Chen Chia-chun 83' (o.g.)	Stadium: National Stadium; Referee: Kim Hee-gon (South Korea)

13 June 2017 2019 AFC Asian Cup qualification – third round	Singapore	1–2	Chinese Taipei	Kallang, Singapore
TBC TBC	Hariss Harun 6'		Xavier Chen 31'; Chen Chao-an 60'	Stadium: Jalan Besar Stadium; Attendance: 5,234; Referee: Ahmed Faisal (Jordan)

5 September 2017 2019 AFC Asian Cup qualification – third round	Bahrain	5–0	Chinese Taipei	Riffa, Bahrain
TBC TBC	Al-Aswad 11'; Madan 45+4'; Abduljabbar 56', 89'; Helal 74'			Stadium: Bahrain National Stadium; Attendance: 362; Referee: Nagor Amir Noor Mohamed (Malaysia)

5 October 2017 Friendly	Chinese Taipei	4–2	Mongolia	Taipei, Taiwan
18:00 UTC+8	Chen Hao-wei 42'; Chen Po-liang 52', 57' (pen.); Jiang Sin-long 86'		Mönkh-Erdene 5'; Naranbold 75'	Stadium: National Stadium

10 October 2017 2019 AFC Asian Cup qualification – third round	Chinese Taipei	2–1	Bahrain	Taipei, Taiwan
19:00 UTC+8	Chen Po-liang 90'; Chu En-le 90+3'	Report	Abdul-Latif 19' (pen.)	Stadium: National Stadium; Attendance: 7,908; Referee: Hiroyuki Kimura (Japan)

14 November 2017 2019 AFC Asian Cup qualification – third round	Turkmenistan	2–1	Chinese Taipei	Balkanabat, Turkmenistan
TBC TBC	Ýagşyýew 21'; Annadurdyýew 39'		Chen Po-liang 88' (pen.)	Stadium: Sport Toplumy Stadium

3 December 2017 2017 CTFA International Tournament	Chinese Taipei	3–0	Philippines	Taipei, Taiwan
19:00 UTC+8	Li Mao 37', 62'; Chen Ting-yang 81'			Stadium: Taipei Municipal Stadium

4 December 2017 2017 CTFA International Tournament	Chinese Taipei	3–1	Timor-Leste	Taipei, Taiwan
19:00 UTC+8	Wen Chih-hao 25'; Chen Ting-yang 63'; Chen Po-liang 77'		Gama 58'	Stadium: Taipei Municipal Stadium

5 December 2017 2017 CTFA International Tournament	Chinese Taipei	2–0	Laos	Taipei, Taiwan
19:00 UTC+8	Li Mao 9', 12'			Stadium: Taipei Municipal Stadium

=== 2016 ===
19 March 2016 Friendly	Chinese Taipei	3–2	Guam	Taipei, Taiwan
19:00 UTC+8	Chen Chao-an 5'; Wu Chun-ching 61'; Chen Wei-chuan 80'		Lee 34'; Malcolm 44'	Stadium: Taipei Municipal Stadium; Attendance: 4,584; Referee: (Hong Kong) Lau Fong-hei

24 March 2016 2018 FIFA World Cup qualification – AFC second round	Vietnam	4–1	Chinese Taipei	Hanoi, Vietnam
19:00 UTC+7	Lê Công Vinh 8', 90+1'; Nguyễn Văn Toàn 29', 42'	Report (FIFA); Report (AFC)	Wu Chun-ching 7'	Stadium: Mỹ Đình National Stadium; Attendance: 18,350; Referee: (Jordan) Adham Makhadmeh

2 June 2016 2019 AFC Asian Cup qualification – play-off round	Chinese Taipei	2–2	Cambodia	Kaohsiung, Taiwan
19:00 UTC+8	Huang Wei-min 6'; Chen Po-liang 22'	(AFC)	Sokpheng 8'; Chhoeun 31'	Stadium: National Stadium; Attendance: 3,564; Referee: (India) Pranjal Banerjee

7 June 2016 2019 AFC Asian Cup qualification – play-off round	Cambodia	2–0	Chinese Taipei	Phnom Penh, Cambodia
19:00 UTC+7	Hong Pheng 11'; Prak Mony Udom 60' (pen.)			Stadium: Olympic Stadium; Referee: (Jordan) Ahmed Al-Ali

30 June 2016 2017 EAFF East Asian Cup – First Round	Chinese Taipei	8–1	Northern Mariana Islands	Dededo, Guam
17:00 UTC+10	Wu Chun-ching 30', 56'; Chen Wei-chuan 36'; Lin Chieh-hsun 40', 63', 81', 90+2'; Chen Yi-wei 45'		Schuler 90'	Stadium: GFA National Training Center; Referee: (Mongolia) Khash Erdene Bold

2 July 2016 2017 EAFF East Asian Cup – First Round	Mongolia	0–2	Chinese Taipei	Dededo, Guam
17:00 UTC+10			Lin Chieh-hsun 57'; Lin Shih-kai 89'	Stadium: GFA National Training Center; Referee: (Japan) Takuto Okabe

4 July 2016 2017 EAFF East Asian Cup – First Round	Chinese Taipei	3–2	Macau	Dededo, Guam
17:00 UTC+10	Lin Chieh-Hsun 36', 64'; Tsai Shuo-Che 88'		Chan Man 8'; Lei Ka Him 77'	Stadium: GFA National Training Center

8 October 2016 2019 AFC Asian Cup qualification – play-off round	Timor-Leste	1–2	Chinese Taipei	Kaohsiung, Taiwan
19:00 UTC+8	Rufino 5'	Report	Wu Chun-Ching 8', 38'	Stadium: National Stadium; Attendance: 2,849; Referee: (Vietnam) Võ Minh Trí

11 October 2016 2019 AFC Asian Cup qualification – play-off round	Chinese Taipei	2–1	Timor-Leste	Kaohsiung, Taiwan
19:00 UTC+8	Chen Yi-wei 10'; Chen Hao-wei 75'		Jose Oliveira 85'	Stadium: National Stadium; Attendance: 1,000; Referee: (South Korea) Kim Hee-gon

6 November 2016 2017 EAFF East Asian Cup – Second Round	North Korea	2–0	Chinese Taipei	Hong Kong
15:00 UTC+8	Jong Il-gwan 16'; Sim Hyon-jin 87'			Stadium: Mong Kok Stadium

9 November 2016 2017 EAFF East Asian Cup – Second Round	Hong Kong	4–2	Chinese Taipei	Hong Kong
17:30 UTC+8	Alex 21', 48', 70', 71'		Chen Po-liang 62'; Chen Chao-an 88'	Stadium: Mong Kok Stadium; Attendance: 3,354; Referee: Wang Di (China)

12 November 2016 2017 EAFF East Asian Cup – Second Round	Chinese Taipei	2–0	Guam	Hong Kong
15:00 UTC+8	Wu Chun-ching 26'; Lin Chien-hsun 80'			Stadium: Hong Kong Stadium; Referee: Tumenbayar Doljinsuren (Mongolia)

=== 2015 ===
12 March 2015 2018 FIFA World Cup qualification – AFC first round	Chinese Taipei	0–1	Brunei	Kaohsiung, Taiwan
19:00 UTC+8			Adi Said 36'	Stadium: National Stadium; Attendance: 6,273; Referee: Rowan Arumughan (India)

17 March 2015 2018 FIFA World Cup qualification – AFC first round	Brunei	0–2	Chinese Taipei	Bandar Seri Begawan, Brunei
20:15 UTC+8			Wang Ruei 37'; Chu En-Le 53'	Stadium: Sultan Hassanal Bolkiah Stadium; Attendance: 18,000; Referee: (Saudi Arabia) Turki Al-Khudhayr

16 June 2015 2018 FIFA World Cup qualification – AFC second round	Chinese Taipei	0–2	Thailand	Taipei, Taiwan
19:30 UTC+8			Dangda 21', 39'	Stadium: Taipei Municipal Stadium; Attendance: 18,168; Referee: (Kuwait) Ali Shaban

3 September 2015 2018 FIFA World Cup qualification – AFC second round	Iraq	5–1	Chinese Taipei	Tehran, Iran
17:00 UTC+4:30	Adnan 37'; Hosni 59'; Yasin 80'; Mahmoud 88'; Meram 90+1' (pen.)		Wen Chih-hao 86'	Stadium: Azadi Stadium (Note: Iraq played their home matches in Iran due to security concerns from the Iraqi insurgency.); Attendance: 4,200; Referee: (Oman) Yaqoob Abdul Baki

8 September 2015 2018 FIFA World Cup qualification – AFC second round	Chinese Taipei	1–2	Vietnam	Taipei, Taiwan
19:00 UTC+8	Wu Chun-ching 82'		Đinh Tiến Thành 53'; Trần Phi Sơn 90+2'	Stadium: Taipei Municipal Stadium; Attendance: 20,239; Referee: (South Korea) Kim Dae-yong

9 October 2015 Friendly	Chinese Taipei	5–1	Macau	Taipei, Taiwan
19:00 UTC+8	Wen Chih-hao 22'; Chen Hao-Wei 42', 71'; Xavier Chen 61'; Onur Dogan 68'		Lam Ka Seng 17'	Stadium: Taipei Municipal Stadium

12 November 2015 2018 FIFA World Cup qualification – AFC second round	Thailand	4–2	Chinese Taipei	Bangkok, Thailand
19:00 UTC+7	Teerasil 41'; Pokklaw 52'; Adisak 72'; Tana 74'		Yaki Yen 3'; Hung Kai-chun 65'	Stadium: Rajamangala Stadium; Attendance: 50,000; Referee: (Kyrgyzstan) Dmitriy Mashentsev

17 November 2015 2018 FIFA World Cup qualification – AFC second round	Chinese Taipei	0–2	Iraq	Kaohsiung, Taiwan
19:00 UTC+8			Ismail 19'; Mahmoud 85'	Stadium: National Stadium; Attendance: 11,960; Referee: (Japan) Jumpei Iida

=== 2014 ===
3 September 2014 2014 Philippine Peace Cup	Philippines	5–1	Chinese Taipei	Manila, Philippines
	Gier 24'; J.Younghusband 37'; Chen Yi Wei 65' (o.g.); Hartmann 74', 88'		Yen Ho-Sen 80'	Stadium: Rizal Memorial Stadium; Referee: (Cambodia) Chanketya Thong

6 September 2014 2014 Philippine Peace Cup	Chinese Taipei	3–7 (a.e.t.)	Palestine	Manila, Philippines
	Wu Pai-ho 53' (pen.); Yen Ho-Sen 76'; Lin Chang-Lun 86'		Mereles 5'; Wridat 9', 107', 112', 117'; Abuhabib 90+2'; Bahdari 109'	Stadium: Rizal Memorial Stadium; Referee: (Indonesia) Thoriq Munir Al Katiri

8 October 2014 Friendly	Chinese Taipei	0–2	Cambodia	Taipei, Taiwan
			Chan Vathanaka 90+1', 90+3'	Stadium: Taipei Municipal Stadium; Attendance: 5,000; Referee: (Hong Kong) Ho Wai Sing

13 November 2014 2015 EAFF East Asian Cup	Chinese Taipei	1–2	Guam	Taipei, Taiwan
19:00 UTC+8	Chen Hao-wei 57'		Cunliffe 14' (pen.); Malcolm 42'	Stadium: Taipei Municipal Stadium; Attendance: 2,405; Referee: (South Korea) Kim Dae-yong

16 November 2014 2015 EAFF East Asian Cup	Chinese Taipei	0–1	Hong Kong	Taipei, Taiwan
19:00 UTC+8			Lam Ka Wai 54' (pen.)	Stadium: Taipei Municipal Stadium; Attendance: 8,860; Referee: (North Korea) Kim Song-ho

19 November 2014 2015 EAFF East Asian Cup	Chinese Taipei	0–0	North Korea	Taipei, Taiwan
19:00 UTC+8				Stadium: Taipei Municipal Stadium; Attendance: 5,807; Referee: (Japan) Hiroyuki Kimura

=== 2013 ===
2 March 2013 2014 AFC Challenge Cup qualification	India	2–1	Chinese Taipei	Yangon, Myanmar
16:00	Jewel 40'; Robin Singh 90'	Report	Lee Tai-lin 54'	Stadium: Thuwunna Stadium; Attendance: 1,000; Referee: Fahad Al-Mirdasi (Saudi Arabia)

4 March 2013 2014 AFC Challenge Cup qualification	Myanmar	1–1	Chinese Taipei	Yangon, Myanmar
18:45	Soe Kyaw Kyaw 18'	Report	Lee Meng-chian 80' (pen.)	Stadium: Thuwunna Stadium; Attendance: 3,000; Referee: Ko Hyung-Jin (Korea Republic)

6 March 2013 2014 AFC Challenge Cup qualification	Chinese Taipei	0–3	Guam	Yangon, Myanmar
16:00		Report	Cunliffe 16', 79'; Mariano 56'	Stadium: Thuwunna Stadium; Attendance: 700; Referee: Fahad Al-Mirdasi (Saudi Arabia)

11 October 2013 2013 Philippine Peace Cup	Philippines	1–2	Chinese Taipei	Bacolod, Philippines
19:00	J. Younghusband 45+3'	Report	Li-Mao 14'; Lin Chang-Lun 65'	Stadium: Panaad Stadium

13 October 2013 2013 Philippine Peace Cup	Chinese Taipei	0–1	Pakistan	Bacolod, Philippines
16:00		Report	Rehman 7'	Stadium: Panaad Stadium

=== 2012 ===
29 February 2012 Friendly	Hong Kong	5–1	Chinese Taipei	Mong Kok, Hong Kong
20:00 UTC+08:00	Chan Siu Ki 2', 5', 82'; Lee Hong Lim 16'; Chan Man Fai 47'		Kuo Yin-hung 45'	Stadium: Mong Kok Stadium

25 September 2012 2012 Philippine Peace Cup	Chinese Taipei	2–2	Macau	Manila, Philippines
16:00 UTC+08:00	Lo Chih-en 48'; Yang Chao-hsun 89' (pen.)		R. Torrão 45'; Chan Kin Seng 57'	Stadium: Rizal Memorial Stadium; Referee: Jovanie Villagracia (Philippines)

27 September 2012 2012 Philippine Peace Cup	Chinese Taipei	2–0	Guam	Manila, Philippines
16:00 UTC+08:00	Lo Chih-an 11'; S. Guerrero 45' (o.g.)			Stadium: Rizal Memorial Stadium; Referee: Steve Supresencia (Philippines)

29 September 2012 2012 Philippine Peace Cup	Philippines	3–1	Chinese Taipei	Manila, Philippines
19:30 UTC+08:00	Wolf 10'; Caligdong 34'; Porteria 43'		Chang Han 51'	Stadium: Rizal Memorial Stadium; Referee: Phung Dinh Dung (Vietnam)

1 December 2012 2013 EAFF East Asian Cup Semi-Final	North Korea	6–1	Chinese Taipei	Mong Kok, Hong Kong
17:10 UTC+08:00	An Il-Bom 28'; Pak Song-Chol 34'; Ri Kwang-Hyok 42'; Pak Nam-Chol I 65'; Ri Myong-Jun 67', 89'		Chen Hao-Wei 79'	Stadium: Mong Kok Stadium; Attendance: 3,040; Referee: Wang Zhe (China PR)

5 December 2012 2013 EAFF East Asian Cup Semi-Final	Chinese Taipei	1–1	Guam	So Kon Po, Hong Kong
17:50 UTC+08:00	Lo Chih-An 90+2'		Naputi 67'	Stadium: Hong Kong Stadium; Attendance: 989; Referee: Kim Dae-Yong (Korea Republic)

7 December 2012 2013 EAFF East Asian Cup Semi-Final	Hong Kong	2–0	Chinese Taipei	So Kon Po, Hong Kong
20:30 UTC+08:00	Chan Wai Ho 24'; Lee Hong Lim 25'			Stadium: Hong Kong Stadium; Attendance: 2,315; Referee: Jumpei Iida (Japan)

9 December 2012 2013 EAFF East Asian Cup Semi-Final	Australia	8–0	Chinese Taipei	So Kon Po, Hong Kong
17:00 UTC+08:00	Garcia 11'; Cornthwaite 17'; Taggart 20', 29'; Behich 34', 57'; Mooy 47'; Yang Chao-hsun 82' (o.g.)			Stadium: Hong Kong Stadium; Attendance: 3,345; Referee: Kim Dae-Yong (Korea Republic)

=== 2011 ===
10 February 2011 2012 AFC Challenge Cup qualification	Chinese Taipei	5–2	Laos	Kaohsiung, Taiwan
19:00 UTC+08:00	Lin Cheng-yi 10'; Chang Han 22', 56'; Chen Po-liang 44'; Lo Chih-an 49'		Thongkhen 65'; Syvilay 73'	Stadium: National Stadium; Attendance: 1,000; Referee: Ng Chiu Kok (Hong Kong)

16 February 2011 2012 AFC Challenge Cup qualification	Laos	1–1	Chinese Taipei	Vientiane, Laos
18:00 UTC+7	Vongchiengkham 82'		Chen Po-liang 65'	Stadium: National Sports Complex, Vientiane; Attendance: 15,300; Referee: Mohd Nafeez Abdul Wahab (Malaysia)

21 March 2011 2012 AFC Challenge Cup qualification	India	3–0	Chinese Taipei	Petaling Jaya, Malaysia
19:30 UTC+07:00	Lalpekhlua 32'; Chhetri 76'; Shaikh 88'			Stadium: MBPJ Stadium; Attendance: 50; Referee: Mohd Nafeez Abdul Wahab (Malaysia)

23 March 2011 2012 AFC Challenge Cup qualification	Chinese Taipei	0–2	Turkmenistan	Petaling Jaya, Malaysia
19:30 UTC+07:00			Şamyradow 73'; Hangeldiýew 76'	Stadium: MBPJ Stadium; Attendance: 100; Referee: Viktor Serazitdinov (Uzbekistan)

25 March 2011 2012 AFC Challenge Cup qualification	Pakistan	2–0	Chinese Taipei	Petaling Jaya, Malaysia
19:30 UTC+07:00	Mehmood 26'; Bashir 67'			Stadium: MBPJ Stadium; Attendance: 50; Referee: Mohammad Al Rshaidat (Jordan)

29 June 2011 2014 FIFA World Cup qualification – AFC first round	Malaysia	2–1	Chinese Taipei	Kuala Lumpur, Malaysia
20:45 UTC+08:00	Safiq 29'; Aidil 54'		Chen Po-liang 76'	Stadium: National Stadium; Attendance: 45,000; Referee: Chaiya Mahapab (Thailand)

3 July 2011 2014 FIFA World Cup qualification – AFC first round	Chinese Taipei	3–2	Malaysia	Taipei, Taiwan
19:00 UTC+08:00	Chang Han 31'; Chen Po-liang 44' (pen.); X. Chen 75' (pen.)		Aidil 8'; Safiq 40'	Stadium: Municipal Stadium; Attendance: 16,768; Referee: Vo Minh Tri (Vietnam)

18 July 2011 Friendly	Singapore	3–2	Chinese Taipei	Singapore, Singapore
19:30 UTC+08:00	Duric 17', 54'; Fazrul Nawaz 82'		Lo Chih-an 48'; Chiang Shih-lu 62'	Stadium: Jalan Besar Stadium

30 September 2011 2011 Long Teng Cup	Chinese Taipei	3–0	Macau	Kaohsiung, Taiwan
19:00 UTC+08:00	Chiu I-huan 11'; Chen Po-liang 31'; Wu Chun-ching 45+2'			Stadium: Kaohsiung National Stadium

2 October 2011 2011 Long Teng Cup	Chinese Taipei	0–0	Philippines	Kaohsiung, Taiwan
19:00 UTC+08:00				Stadium: Kaohsiung National Stadium

4 October 2011 2011 Long Teng Cup	Chinese Taipei	0–6	Hong Kong	Kaohsiung, Taiwan
19:00 UTC+08:00			Chan Siu Ki 14'; Kwok Kin Pong 25'; Chan Wai Ho 40'; Lee Hong Lim 42', 68'; Lo Kwan Yee 76'	Stadium: Kaohsiung National Stadium

=== 2010 ===
16 January 2010 Friendly	Chinese Taipei	0–0	Philippines	Kaohsiung, Taiwan
				Stadium: Kaohsiung National Stadium

8 October 2010 2010 Long Teng Cup	Chinese Taipei	7–1	Macau	Kaohsiung, Taiwan
19:30 UTC+08:00	Lin Cheng-yi 16'; Lo Chih-en 43'; Lo Chih-an 45'; Chen Po-hao 46', 77'; Chang Han 55'; Chen Po-liang 67'		Leong Ka Hang 82'	Stadium: Kaohsiung National Stadium

10 October 2010 2010 Long Teng Cup	Chinese Taipei	1–1	Philippines	Kaohsiung, Taiwan
19:30 UTC+08:00	Lo Chih-an 48'		Araneta 90+3'	Stadium: Kaohsiung National Stadium

12 October 2010 2010 Long Teng Cup	Chinese Taipei	1–1	Hong Kong	Kaohsiung, Taiwan
19:00 UTC+08:00	Lo Chih-an 40'		Lo Kwan Yee 75' (pen.)	Stadium: Kaohsiung National Stadium

24 November 2010 Friendly	Indonesia	2–0	Chinese Taipei	Palembang, Indonesia
	Gonzáles 10'; Firman 18' (pen.)			Stadium: Gelora Sriwijaya Stadium; Referee: Sukhbir Singh (Singapore)

== Key ==
Key to matches

- Att. = Match attendance
- (H) = Home ground
- (A) = Away ground
- (N) = Neutral ground

Key to record by opponent

- Pld = Games played
- W = Games won
- D = Games drawn
- L = Games lost
- GF = Goals for
- GA = Goals against

== A-International results ==
Chinese Taipei's score is shown first in each case.

No.	Date	Venue	Opponents	Score	Competition	Chinese Taipei scorers	Att.	Ref.
102	7 May 1981	Taipei Municipal Stadium, Taipei (H)	New Zealand	0–0	1982 FIFA World Cup qualification		12,000	
103	30 May 1981	Mount Smart Stadium, Auckland (A)	New Zealand	0–2	1982 FIFA World Cup qualification		3,077	
104	6 June 1981	Govind Park, Ba (A)	Fiji	1–2	1982 FIFA World Cup qualification	Chang Kuo Chi	6,000	
105	10 June 1981	Hindmarsh Stadium, Adelaide (A)	Australia	2–3	1982 FIFA World Cup qualification	Duh Deng-Sheng (2)	3,200	
106	15 June 1981	Senayan Stadium, Jakarta (A)	Indonesia	0–1	1982 FIFA World Cup qualification		14,000	
107	18 June 1981	Philippines (A)	Philippines	2–0	Friendly	Unknown	—	
108	28 June 1981	Taipei Municipal Stadium, Taipei (H)	Indonesia	2–0	1982 FIFA World Cup qualification	Deng Chyan, Jyn Tson	7,500	
109	4 August 1981	Taipei Municipal Stadium, Taipei (H)	Fiji	0–0	1982 FIFA World Cup qualification		5,600	
110	6 September 1981	Taipei Municipal Stadium, Taipei (H)	Australia	0–0	1982 FIFA World Cup qualification		7,000	
111	6 May 1983	Indonesia (A)	Indonesia	2–0	Friendly	Unknown	—	
112	21 August 1983	Taipei Municipal Stadium, Taipei (H)	Papua New Guinea	3–3	1984 Summer Olympics qualification	Wu Shui-chi, Tu Teng-chuan, Wang Tun-cheng	—	
113	23 August 1983	Taipei Municipal Stadium, Taipei (H)	Papua New Guinea	0–0 (4–2p)	1984 Summer Olympics qualification		—	
114	15 September 1983	National Stadium, Tokyo (A)	Japan	0–2	1984 Summer Olympics qualification		—	
115	20 September 1983	Taipei Municipal Stadium, Taipei (H)	Japan	1–1	1984 Summer Olympics qualification	Du Denggen	—	
116	1 October 1983	Mount Smart Stadium, Auckland (A)	New Zealand	0–2	1984 Summer Olympics qualification		—	
117	12 October 1983	Taipei Municipal Stadium, Taipei (H)	New Zealand	1–1	1984 Summer Olympics qualification	Lee Tsung-Chih	—	
118	3 September 1985	Ramat Gan Stadium, Ramat Gan (H)	Israel	0–6	1986 FIFA World Cup qualification		30,000	
119	8 September 1985	Ramat Gan Stadium, Ramat Gan (A)	Israel	0–5	1986 FIFA World Cup qualification		10,000	
120	5 October 1985	Mount Smart Stadium, Auckland (H)	New Zealand	1–5	1986 FIFA World Cup qualification	Chen Sing-an	5,152	>
121	12 October 1985	Queen Elizabeth II Park, Christchurch (A)	New Zealand	0–5	1986 FIFA World Cup qualification		5,200	
122	23 October 1985	Hindmarsh Stadium, Adelaide (H)	Australia	0–7	1986 FIFA World Cup qualification		2,000	
123	27 October 1985	St George Stadium, Sydney (A)	Australia	0–8	1986 FIFA World Cup qualification		2,694	
124	14 September 1986	Taipei (H)	Bahrain	1–1	Friendly	Unknown	—	
125	16 September 1986	Taipei (H)	Bahrain	0–1	Friendly		—	
126	15 November 1987	Taipei (H)	Australia	0–3	1988 Summer Olympics qualification		—	
127	26 February 1988	Canberra Stadium, Canberra (A)	Australia	0–3	1988 Summer Olympics qualification		—	
128	2 March 1988	St George Stadium, Sydney (N)	Western Samoa	5–0	1988 Summer Olympics qualification	Miao Chin-Chung (3), Pan Yung-I, Chien I-Shiu	—	
129	6 March 1988	Olympic Park Stadium, Melbourne (N)	New Zealand	0–1	1988 Summer Olympics qualification		—	
130	9 March 1988	Hindmarsh Stadium, Adelaide (A)	Australia	2–3	1988 Summer Olympics qualification	Wu Chau-In, Chien I-Shiu	—	
131	13 March 1988	Sydney Football Stadium, Sydney (N)	Israel	1–5	1988 Summer Olympics qualification	Chen Sing-an	—	
132	20 March 1988	Queen Elizabeth II Park, Christchurch (A)	New Zealand	0–2	1988 Summer Olympics qualification		—	
133	23 March 1988	Athletic Park, Wellington (N)	Israel	0–9	1988 Summer Olympics qualification		—	
134	27 March 1988	Eden Park, Auckland (N)	Australia	0–3	1988 Summer Olympics qualification		—	
135	11 December 1988	Newtown Park, Wellington (H)	New Zealand	0–4	1990 FIFA World Cup qualification		3,000	
136	15 December 1988	Western Springs Stadium, Auckland (A)	New Zealand	1–4	1990 FIFA World Cup qualification	Lund (o.g.)	9,000	
137	3 June 1992	Pyongyang (A)	North Korea	0–6	1992 AFC Asian Cup qualification		—	
138	5 June 1992	Pyongyang (N)	Hong Kong	0–0	1992 AFC Asian Cup qualification		—	
139	7 June 1992	Pyongyang (N)	Macau	0–2	1992 AFC Asian Cup qualification		—	
140	23 June 1993	Azadi Stadium, Tehran (N)	Syria	0–2	1994 FIFA World Cup qualification		—	
141	25 June 1993	Azadi Stadium, Tehran (A)	Iran	0–6	1994 FIFA World Cup qualification		70,000	
142	27 June 1993	Azadi Stadium, Tehran (N)	Oman	1–2	1994 FIFA World Cup qualification	Chen Fu-Yuan	—	
143	2 July 1993	Abbasiyyin Stadium, Damascus (A)	Syria	1–8	1994 FIFA World Cup qualification	Chen Jiunn-ming	—	
144	4 July 1993	Abbasiyyin Stadium, Damascus (N)	Iran	0–6	1994 FIFA World Cup qualification		15,000	
145	7 July 1993	Abbasiyyin Stadium, Damascus (N)	Oman	1–7	1994 FIFA World Cup qualification	Yeh Ching-Tueng	—	
146	4 August 1996	Thống Nhất Stadium, Ho Chi Minh City (A)	Vietnam	1–4	1996 AFC Asian Cup qualification	Huang Che-ming	—	
147	8 August 1996	Thống Nhất Stadium, Ho Chi Minh City (N)	South Korea	0–4	1996 AFC Asian Cup qualification		—	
148	10 August 1996	Thống Nhất Stadium, Ho Chi Minh City (N)	Guam	9–2	1996 AFC Asian Cup qualification	Chen Jiunn-ming (2), Lee Cheng-Te, Shin Cing-Hau, Hsu Jui-chen (3), Huang Wen-cheng, Wu Chin-i	—	
149	16 March 1997	Shah Alam Stadium, Shah Alam (N)	Saudi Arabia	0–2	1998 FIFA World Cup qualification		15,000	
150	18 March 1997	Shah Alam Stadium, Shah Alam (N)	Bangladesh	3–1	1998 FIFA World Cup qualification	Lin Wen Han, Huang Che-ming, Chen Kuei-jen	10,000	
151	20 March 1997	Shah Alam Stadium, Shah Alam (A)	Malaysia	0–2	1998 FIFA World Cup qualification		10,293	
152	27 March 1997	Youth Welfare, Jeddah (N)	Malaysia	0–0	1998 FIFA World Cup qualification		20,000	
153	29 March 1997	Youth Welfare, Jeddah (N)	Bangladesh	1–2	1998 FIFA World Cup qualification	Hsu Te Ming	2,000	
154	31 March 1997	Youth Welfare, Jeddah (A)	Saudi Arabia	0–6	1998 FIFA World Cup qualification		9,000	
155	25 March 2000	Shah Alam Stadium, Shah Alam (A)	Malaysia	0–3	2000 AFC Asian Cup qualification		—	
156	27 March 2000	Shah Alam Stadium, Shah Alam (N)	Thailand	0–2	2000 AFC Asian Cup qualification		—	
157	29 March 2000	Shah Alam Stadium, Shah Alam (N)	North Korea	0–2	2000 AFC Asian Cup qualification		4,000	
158	4 April 2000	Suphachalasai Stadium, Bangkok (N)	Malaysia	3–2	2000 AFC Asian Cup qualification	Shea Sheau Bao (2), Hsu Jui-chen	—	
159	6 April 2000	Suphachalasai Stadium, Bangkok (A)	Thailand	0–1	2000 AFC Asian Cup qualification		—	
160	9 April 2000	Suphachalasai Stadium, Bangkok (N)	North Korea	0–1	2000 AFC Asian Cup qualification		45,000	
161	30 August 2000	Senayan Stadium, Jakarta (A)	Indonesia	0–1	2000 Indonesia Independence Cup		—	
162	1 September 2000	Senayan Stadium, Jakarta (N)	Myanmar	1–1	2000 Indonesia Independence Cup	Unknown	—	
163	23 April 2001	Pakhtakor Markaziy Stadium, Tashkent (A)	Uzbekistan	0–7	2002 FIFA World Cup qualification		45,000	
164	25 April 2001	Pakhtakor Markaziy Stadium, Tashkent (N)	Jordan	0–2	2002 FIFA World Cup qualification		5,000	
165	27 April 2001	Pakhtakor Markaziy Stadium, Tashkent (N)	Turkmenistan	0–5	2002 FIFA World Cup qualification		6,000	
166	3 May 2001	Amman International Stadium, Amman (A)	Jordan	0–6	2002 FIFA World Cup qualification		8,000	
167	5 May 2001	Amman International Stadium, Amman (N)	Uzbekistan	0–4	2002 FIFA World Cup qualification		400	
168	7 May 2001	Amman International Stadium, Amman (N)	Turkmenistan	0–1	2002 FIFA World Cup qualification		20	
169	25 July 2002	Warner Park, Basseterre (A)	Saint Kitts and Nevis	0–3	St. Kitts Festival		—	
170	27 July 2002	Warner Park, Basseterre (N)	Trinidad and Tobago	1–0	St. Kitts Festival	Unknown	—	
171	27 July 2002	Grenada National Cricket Stadium, St. George's (A)	Grenada	2–5	Friendly	Hsiao Hsien-Chang, Chen Kun-Shan	4,500	
172	22 February 2003	Hong Kong Stadium, Hong Kong (A)	Hong Kong	0–2	2003 East Asian Football Championship		6,055	
173	26 February 2003	Hong Kong Stadium, Hong Kong (N)	Mongolia	4–0	2003 East Asian Football Championship	Huang Che-ming (2), Chiang Shih-lu, Yang Cheng-hsing	672	
174	28 February 2003	Hong Kong Stadium, Hong Kong (N)	Guam	7–0	2003 East Asian Football Championship	Tu Chu-hsien (2), Sheu Sheau-bao (3), Hsu Jui-chen, Tu Ming-feng	1,814	
175	2 March 2003	Hong Kong Stadium, Hong Kong (N)	Macau	2–1	2003 East Asian Football Championship	Wu Chun-I, Huang Che-ming	6,862	
176	23 March 2003	Sugathadasa Stadium, Colombo (N)	Timor-Leste	3–0	2004 AFC Asian Cup qualification	Chen Jiunn-ming, Chang Wu-yeh, Huang Che-ming	—	
177	25 March 2003	Sugathadasa Stadium, Colombo (A)	Sri Lanka	1–2	2004 AFC Asian Cup qualification	Chang Wu-yeh	—	
178	23 November 2003	Zhongshan Soccer Stadium, Taipei (H)	Macau	3–0	2006 FIFA World Cup qualification	Chuang Yao-tsung, Chen Jui-te, Chang Wu-yeh	2,000	
179	29 November 2003	Estádio Campo Desportivo, Macau (A)	Macau	3–1	2006 FIFA World Cup qualification	Chen Jui-te (2), Chiang Shih-lu	250	
180	18 February 2004	Al-Wakrah Stadium, Al Wakrah (A)	Palestine	0–8	2006 FIFA World Cup qualification		1,000	
181	31 March 2004	Zhongshan Soccer Stadium, Taipei (H)	Uzbekistan	0–1	2006 FIFA World Cup qualification		2,500	
182	9 June 2004	Amman International Stadium, Amman (A)	Iraq	1–6	2006 FIFA World Cup qualification	Huang Wei-yi	2,000	
183	8 September 2004	Zhongshan Soccer Stadium, Taipei (H)	Iraq	1–4	2006 FIFA World Cup qualification	Huang Wei-yi	5,000	
184	14 October 2004	Zhongshan Soccer Stadium, Taipei (H)	Palestine	0–1	2006 FIFA World Cup qualification		500	
185	17 November 2004	Pakhtakor Markaziy Stadium, Tashkent (A)	Uzbekistan	1–6	2006 FIFA World Cup qualification	Huang Wei-yi	20,000	
186	5 March 2005	Zhongshan Soccer Stadium, Taipei (H)	Guam	9–0	2005 East Asian Football Championship	Tu Ming-Feng, Kuo Yin-huong (3), Chiang Shih-lu (2), He Ming-chan (3)	—	
187	9 March 2005	Zhongshan Soccer Stadium, Taipei (H)	North Korea	0–2	2005 East Asian Football Championship		—	
188	11 March 2005	Zhongshan Soccer Stadium, Taipei (H)	Hong Kong	0–5	2005 East Asian Football Championship		—	
188	13 March 2005	Zhongshan Soccer Stadium, Taipei (H)	Mongolia	0–0	2005 East Asian Football Championship		—	
189	22 February 2006	Azadi Stadium, Tehran (A)	Iran	0–4	2007 AFC Asian Cup qualification		5,000	
190	1 March 2006	Zhongshan Soccer Stadium, Taipei (H)	Syria	0–4	2007 AFC Asian Cup qualification		700	
191	1 April 2006	MA Aziz Stadium, Chittagong (N)	Philippines	1–0	2006 AFC Challenge Cup	Chuang Wei-lun	4,000	
192	3 April 2006	MA Aziz Stadium, Chittagong (N)	Afghanistan	2–2	2006 AFC Challenge Cup	Chuang Wei-lun, Liang Chien-wei	2,500	
193	8 April 2006	MA Aziz Stadium, Chittagong (N)	Sri Lanka	0–3	2006 AFC Challenge Cup		2,500	
194	9 August 2006	Macau University of Science and Technology Sports Field, Macau (A)	Macau	1–0	Friendly	Lee Yew-san	—	
195	16 August 2006	Zhongshan Soccer Stadium, Taipei (H)	South Korea	0–3	2007 AFC Asian Cup qualification		1,300	
196	6 September 2006	Suwon World Cup Stadium, Suwon (A)	South Korea	0–8	2007 AFC Asian Cup qualification		21,000	
197	16 August 2006	Taipei Municipal Stadium, Taipei (H)	Iran	0–2	2007 AFC Asian Cup qualification		2,000	
198	18 October 2006	Zhongshan Soccer Stadium, Taipei (H)	São Tomé and Príncipe	2–2	Friendly	Wu Pai-ho, Chiang Shih-lu	—	
199	9 November 2006	Khalifa Bin Zayed Stadium, Al Ain City (N)	Kuwait	0–10	Friendly		—	
200	15 November 2006	Abbasiyyin Stadium, Damascus (A)	Syria	0–3	2007 AFC Asian Cup qualification		1,000	
201	24 March 2007	Zhongshan Soccer Stadium, Taipei (H)	Uzbekistan	0–1	Friendly		—	
202	17 June 2007	Estádio Campo Desportivo, Macau (N)	Guam	10–0	2008 East Asian Football Championship	Lo Chih En (4), Tsai Hui-Kai, Feng Pao-hsing (2), Chen Po-Liang (2), Huang Cheng-Tsung	300	
203	19 June 2007	Estádio Campo Desportivo, Macau (N)	Hong Kong	1–1	2008 East Asian Football Championship	Huang Wei-yi	200	
204	24 June 2007	Estádio Campo Desportivo, Macau (A)	Macau	7–2	2008 East Asian Football Championship	Huang Wei Yi, Feng Pao-hsing, Kuo Chun Yi, Chen Po Liang, Lo Chih En (2), Lo Chih An	200	
205	13 October 2007	Pakhtakor Markaziy Stadium, Tashkent (A)	Uzbekistan	0–9	2010 FIFA World Cup qualification		7,000	
206	28 October 2007	Zhongshan Soccer Stadium, Taipei (H)	Uzbekistan	0–2	2010 FIFA World Cup qualification		800	
207	2 April 2008	Zhongshan Soccer Stadium, Taipei (H)	Pakistan	1–2	2008 AFC Challenge Cup qualification	Lo Chih-an	800	
208	4 April 2008	Zhongshan Soccer Stadium, Taipei (H)	Guam	4–1	2008 AFC Challenge Cup qualification	Chang Han, Huang Wei-yi, Chen Po-liang, Chiang Shih-lu	850	
209	6 April 2008	Zhongshan Soccer Stadium, Taipei (H)	Sri Lanka	2–2	2008 AFC Challenge Cup qualification	Chang Han, Tsai Hsien-tang	850	
210	24 May 2008	Jawaharlal Nehru Stadium, Goa (A)	India	0–3	Friendly		—	
211	27 May 2008	Jawaharlal Nehru Stadium, Chennai (A)	India	2–2	Friendly	Chen Po-liang, Hsieh Meng-hsuan	—	
212	4 April 2009	Sugathadasa Stadium, Colombo (N)	Pakistan	1–1	2010 AFC Challenge Cup qualification	Chang Han	400	
213	6 April 2009	Sugathadasa Stadium, Colombo (A)	Sri Lanka	1–2	2010 AFC Challenge Cup qualification	Huang Wei-yi	1,400	
214	10 April 2009	Sugathadasa Stadium, Colombo (N)	Brunei	5–0	2010 AFC Challenge Cup qualification	Chen Po-liang (3), Huang Wei-yi, Kuo Chun-yi	1,000	
215	23 August 2009	World Games Stadium, Kaohsiung (H)	Hong Kong	0–4	2010 East Asian Football Championship		12,000	
216	25 August 2009	World Games Stadium, Kaohsiung (H)	Guam	4–2	2010 East Asian Football Championship	Chen Po-liang (2), Chang Han, Lo Chih-en	7,500	
217	27 August 2009	World Games Stadium, Kaohsiung (H)	North Korea	1–2	2010 East Asian Football Championship	Chang Han	10,000	
218	16 January 2010	Kaohsiung National Stadium, Kaohsiung (H)	Philippines	0–0	Friendly		—	
219	9 October 2010	Kaohsiung National Stadium, Kaohsiung (H)	Macau	7–1	2010 Long Teng Cup	Lin Cheng-yi, Lo Chih-en, Lo Chih-an, Chen Po-hao (2), Chang Han, Chen Po-liang	1,000	
220	10 October 2010	Kaohsiung National Stadium, Kaohsiung (H)	Philippines	1–1	2010 Long Teng Cup	Lo Chih-an	890	
221	24 November 2010	Gelora Sriwijaya Stadium, Palembang (A)	Indonesia	0–2	Friendly		—	
222	10 February 2011	Kaohsiung National Stadium, Kaohsiung (H)	Laos	5–2	2012 AFC Challenge Cup qualification	Lin Cheng-yi, Chang Han (2), Chen Po-liang, Lo Chih-an	1,000	
223	16 February 2011	New Laos National Stadium, Vientiane (A)	Laos	1–1	2012 AFC Challenge Cup qualification	Chen Po-liang	15,300	
224	21 March 2011	Petaling Jaya Stadium, Petaling Jaya (N)	India	0–3	2012 AFC Challenge Cup qualification		50	
225	23 March 2011	Petaling Jaya Stadium, Petaling Jaya (N)	Turkmenistan	0–2	2012 AFC Challenge Cup qualification		100	
226	25 March 2011	Petaling Jaya Stadium, Petaling Jaya (N)	Pakistan	0–2	2012 AFC Challenge Cup qualification		50	
227	29 June 2011	Bukit Jalil National Stadium, Kuala Lumpur (A)	Malaysia	1–2	2014 FIFA World Cup qualification	Chen Po-liang	45,000	
228	3 July 2011	Taipei Municipal Stadium, Taipei (H)	Malaysia	3–2	2014 FIFA World Cup qualification	Chang Han, Chen Po-liang, Xavier Chen	16,768	
229	18 July 2011	Jalan Besar Stadium, Singapore (A)	Singapore	2–3	Friendly	Lo Chih-an, Chiang Shih-lu	—	
230	30 September 2011	Kaohsiung National Stadium, Kaohsiung (H)	Macau	3–0	2011 Long Teng Cup	Chiu I-huan, Chen Po-liang, Wu Chun-ching	—	
231	2 October 2011	Kaohsiung National Stadium, Kaohsiung (H)	Philippines	0–0	2011 Long Teng Cup		—	
232	4 October 2011	Kaohsiung National Stadium, Kaohsiung (H)	Hong Kong	0–6	2011 Long Teng Cup		—	
233	29 February 2012	Mong Kok Stadium, Hong Kong (A)	Hong Kong	1–5	Friendly	Kuo Yin-hung	—	
234	25 September 2012	Rizal Memorial Stadium, Manila (N)	Macau	2–2	2012 Philippine Peace Cup	Lo Chih-en, Yang Chao-hsun	—	
235	27 September 2012	Rizal Memorial Stadium, Manila (N)	Guam	2–0	2012 Philippine Peace Cup	Lo Chih-an, S. Guerrero (o.g.)	—	
236	29 September 2012	Rizal Memorial Stadium, Manila (A)	Philippines	1–3	2012 Philippine Peace Cup	Chang Han	—	

Notes

1. A: At the request of the Chinese Taipei Football Association, all home matches in qualifying for the 1986 FIFA World Cup was played in away teams side.
2. B: Despite being played in New Zealand, this was officially a home match for Chinese Taipei.
3. C: Chinese Taipei played three matches at the 2000 Indonesia Independence Cup, however only two were against full international sides. The other match against Iraq B is considered an unofficial match.
4. D: Chinese Taipei played four matches at the 2006 AFC Challenge Cup, however only three were against full international sides. The other match against India U20 is considered an unofficial match.
5. E: Chinese Taipei played three matches at the 2010 Long Teng Cup, however only two were against full international sides. The other match against Hong Kong U23 is considered an unofficial match.
