= Hung Kai-chun =

Taiwanese footballer

Hung Kai-chun 黃楷峻
Personal information
- Full name: Hung Kai-chun
- Date of birth: 4 March 1987 (age 39)
- Place of birth: Miaoli, Taiwan
- Height: 1.69 m (5 ft 7 in)
- Position: Midfielder

Team information
- Current team: Taiwan Power Company F.C.
- Number: 9

Senior career*
Years	Team	Apps	(Gls)
2011–	Taiwan Power Company		

International career^{‡}
2009–	Chinese Taipei	10	(1)
- * Club domestic league appearances and goals as of 16:28, 13 November 2015 (UTC) ‡ National team caps and goals as of 16:28, 13 November 2015 (UTC)

Hung Kai-chun (Chinese: 黃楷峻; pinyin: Huáng Kǎijùn; born 4 March 1987) is a Taiwanese football player who plays as a midfielder for the Taiwan Power Company.

== International career ==
=== International goals ===
Scores and results list Chinese Taipei's goal tally first.

Goal	Date	Venue	Opponent	Score	Result	Competition
1.	12 November 2015	Rajamangala Stadium, Bangkok, Thailand	Thailand	2–2	2–4	2018 FIFA World Cup qualification

== Honours ==
Taiwan Power Company

Winner

- Intercity Football League (3): 2011, 2012, 2014
- AFC President's Cup: 2011

Runners-up

- Intercity Football League: 2013
