= 1994 Chinese Taipei National Football League =

Statistics of the Chinese Taipei National Football League for the 1994 season.

== Overview ==
It was contested by 8 teams, and Tatung won the championship.

== League standings ==
Pos	Team	Pld	W	D	L	GF	GA	GD	Pts
1	Tatung	12	9	1	2	18	7	+11	19
2	Taipower	12	8	2	2	32	13	+19	18
3	Taipei City Bank	12	7	2	3	21	13	+8	16
4	Flying Camel	12	6	3	3	28	16	+12	15
5	Lukuang	12	3	2	7	20	27	−7	8
6	Chun Li	12	2	2	8	11	23	−12	6
7	Ming Chuan University	7	1	2	4	4	15	−11	4
8	Thunderbird	7	0	0	7	3	23	−20	0

Source: rsssf.com
