= 2010 Intercity Football League =

- League: Intercity Football League
- Sport: Association football
- Duration: April 10, 2010-present
- Teams: 9
- TV partner(s): Videoland, ELTA TV

League

Intercity Football League seasons
- ← 2009 2011 →

The 2010 Intercity Football League is the fourth season of the Intercity Football League since its establishment in 2007. It started on April 10, 2010.

The promotion and relegation regulations used in the 2009 season were cancelled. The 2010 season had only one division. In addition, the league competitions were separated into 2 rounds. A total of 9 teams competed in the first round, and the best 6 would be qualified to the second round.

Famed Taiwanese semiconductor design company MediaTek became the league's major sponsor right before the round 2 began. Therefore, it is also called the MediaTek Intercity Football League.

== Teams ==
Team	Manager
"Hasus" Taiwan PE College	Chao Jung-jui
I-Shou University	Wu Chun-shien
Kaohsiung County Taipower FC	Chen Kuei-jen
Ming Chuan University	Kao Yung
National Sports Training Center football team	Peng Wu-sung
Taipei City Tatung FC	Chiang Mu-tsai
Taipei PE College "Asics"	Lee Po-houng
Yilan County	Yang Shng-yung
Taipei County FC	Unknown

== Round 1 ==
Pos	Team	Pld	W	D	L	GF	GA	GD	Pts	Qualification
1	Taipei PEC Asics	8	6	1	1	24	9	+15	19	Qualification to Round 2
2	Tatung FC	8	5	3	0	21	6	+15	18	Qualification to Round 2
3	NTCPE FC	8	5	0	3	34	9	+25	15	Qualification to Round 2
4	Taipower FC	8	4	2	2	25	10	+15	14	Qualification to Round 2
5	NSTC Football Team	8	4	2	2	14	10	+4	14	Qualification to Round 2
6	Taipei County FC	8	3	1	4	8	13	−5	10	Qualification to Round 2
7	Yilan County FC	8	1	2	5	7	27	−20	5	
8	I-Shou University FC	8	0	1	7	4	35	−31	1	
9	Ming Chuan University FC	8	1	2	5	12	30	−18	5	

== Round 2 ==
Teams played each other once. Points were added to points accumulated in Round 1.

Pos	Team	Pld	W	D	L	GF	GA	GD	Pts
1	Taipower FC (C)	13	8	3	2	41	15	+26	27
2	Taipei PEC Asics	13	7	5	1	35	15	+20	26
3	Tatung FC	13	7	4	2	30	11	+19	25
4	NSTC Football Team	13	7	3	3	24	15	+9	24
5	NTCPE FC	13	6	1	6	38	18	+20	19
6	Taipei County FC	13	3	1	9	13	38	−25	10

(C) Champions

Champions qualify to 2011 AFC President's Cup.
