= 1985 Chinese Taipei National Football League =

The 1985 season of the Chinese Taipei National Football League.

== League table ==
Pos	Team	Pld	W	D	L	GF	GA	GD	Pts
1	Flying Camel	14	12	2	0	35	6	+29	26
2	Taipei City Bank	14	11	1	2	31	6	+25	23
3	Lukuang	14	6	5	3	22	14	+8	17
4	Taipower	14	4	5	5	13	18	−5	13
5	Thunderbird	14	4	4	6	16	14	+2	12
6	Taipei P. E. College	14	3	3	8	13	30	−17	9
7	Ching Wen	14	2	5	7	12	30	−18	9
8	Taiwan P. E. College	14	0	3	11	8	32	−24	3

Source: rsssf.com
