= 2007 Intercity Football League =

- League: Intercity Football League
- Sport: Football (soccer)
- Duration: September 1, 2007 - December 9, 2007

League
- League champions: Taipei City (Tatung)
- Runners-up: Tainan County
- Top scorer: (Chinese Taipei) Lo Chih-en (Yilan County)

Intercity Football League seasons
- 2008 →

The 2007 season was the first season of the Intercity Football League in Taiwan. Eight teams were scheduled to compete in the 2007 league season, but Kaohsiung County withdrew before the league's opening. The seven remaining teams were Taipei City (represented by Tatung F.C.), Taipei County, Tainan City, Tainan County, Chiayi County (sponsored by Le Beau Max Resort), Kaohsiung City, and Yilan County.

== First phase ==
=== Table ===
Pos	Team	Pld	W	D	L	GF	GA	GD	Pts
1	Taipei City (Tatung)	6	5	1	0	19	6	+13	16
2	Yilan County	6	3	2	1	13	7	+6	11
3	Tainan County	6	3	2	1	9	6	+3	11
4	Chiayi County (Le Beau Max)	6	1	3	2	9	11	−2	6
5	Taipei County	6	1	2	3	10	11	−1	5
6	Tainan City	6	0	4	2	13	16	−3	4
7	Kaohsiung City	6	1	0	5	8	24	−16	3

=== Fixtures ===
No.	Date	Home	Result	Away
1	2007-11-03 (d)	Yilan County	5 - 1	Kaohsiung City
2	2007-09-01	Taipei County	2 - 2	Tainan City
3	2007-09-01	Chiayi County	1 - 3	Taipei City
4	2007-09-08	Tainan County	1 - 1	Chiayi County
5	2007-09-08	Taipei City	4 - 1	Taipei County
6	2007-09-08	Tainan City	5 - 6	Kaohsiung City
7	2007-09-15	Yilan County	1 - 1	Tainan City
8	2007-11-05 (d)	Taipei City	5 - 1	Kaohsiung City
9	2007-09-15	Taipei County	1 - 2	Tainan County
10	2007-09-29	Chiayi County	2 - 5	Yilan County
11	2007-11-11 (d)	Tainan County	2 - 0	Kaohsiung City
12	2007-10-13	Taipei City	3 - 3	Tainan City
13	2007-11-03	Yilan County	0 - 2	Taipei City
14	2007-09-22 (a)	Tainan City	1 - 3	Tainan County
15	2007-11-03	Taipei County	1 - 1	Chiayi County
16	2007-11-10	Taipei County	1 - 2	Yilan County
17	2007-11-10	Chiayi County	3 - 0	Kaohsiung City
18	2007-11-10	Tainan County	0 - 2	Taipei City
19	2007-11-17	Yilan County	0 - 0	Tainan County
20	2007-11-17	Tainan City	1 - 1	Chiayi County
21	2007-11-18	Kaohsiung City	0 - 4	Taipei County

== Second phase ==
Semi-finals
December 8, 2007
Taipei City	4
Chiayi County	0
December 8, 2007
Yilan County	3
Tainan County	5

Final
December 9, 2007
Taipei City	3
Tainan County	0
Third place
December 9, 2007
Chiayi County	2
Yilan County	3

5th place
December 9, 2007
Taipei County	5
Tainan City	1

== Awards ==
Golden Boot
(Chinese Taipei) Lo Chih-en (Yilan County)
Golden Ball
(Chinese Taipei) Tsai Hui-kai (Taipei City)
Best Manager
(Chinese Taipei) Chiang Mu-tsai (Taipei City)
Fair Play Award
Taipei City (Tatung F.C.)
Best XI

- Goalkeeper: (Chinese Taipei) Hsu Jen-feng (Taipei City)
- Defenders: (Chinese Taipei) Chang Yung-hsien (Taipei City), (Chinese Taipei) Chang Wu-yeh (Tainan County), Chang Kai-hsian (Taipei County), (Chinese Taipei) Chen Jeng-i (Taipei City)
- Midfielders: (Chinese Taipei) Tseng Tai-lin (Taipei City), (Chinese Taipei) Tsai Hui-kai (Taipei City), (Chinese Taipei) Lin Kuei-pin (Taipei City), (Chinese Taipei) Lo Chih-an (Yilan County)
- Forwards: (Chinese Taipei) Chang Han (Tainan County), (Chinese Taipei) Huang Wei-yi (Yilan County)
