= Wen Chih-hao =

Taiwanese footballer (born 1993)

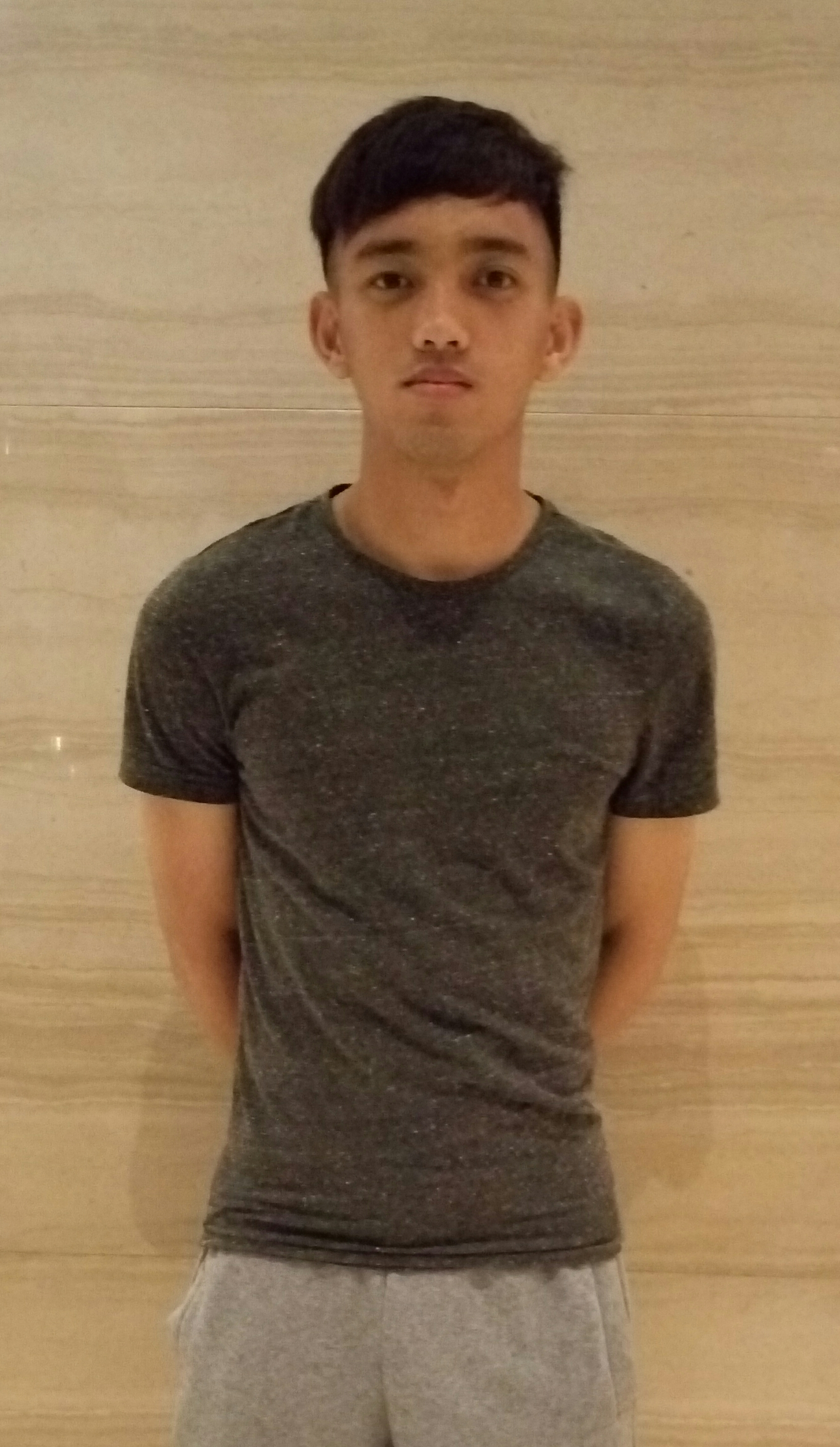
- Wen Chih-hao in 2016

Personal information
- Full name: Wen Chih-hao
- Date of birth: March 25, 1993 (age 33)
- Place of birth: Hualien, Taiwan
- Height: 1.71 m (5 ft 7 in)
- Position: Midfielder

Team information
- Current team: Taichung Futuro

Youth career
- 2008–2011: National Pei Men Senior High School

Senior career*
Years	Team	Apps	(Gls)
2012	Taipower	12	(8)
2013–2021	Beijing BSU	170	(20)
2022	Taipower	15	(7)
2023	AC Taipei	21	(3)
2024–	Taichung Futuro	26	(3)

International career^{‡}
2011	Chinese Taipei U20	5	(0)
2015	Chinese Taipei U23	6	(1)
2012–	Chinese Taipei	50	(4)
Chinese name
Chinese	温智豪
Hanyu Pinyin	Wēn Zhìháo
- * Club domestic league appearances and goals as of 25 May 2026 ‡ National team caps and goals as of 23 November 2023

Wen Chih-hao (Chinese: 溫智豪; born 25 March 1993) is a Taiwanese football player who plays as a midfielder for Taiwan Football Premier League club Taichung Futuro and Chinese Taipei national football team.

== Club career ==
Wen Chih-hao played for the National Pei Men Senior High School team before having an unsuccessful trail at Chinese club Beijing Enterprises Group on 1 December 2011. He went on to start his senior career when he joined reigning league champions Taiwan Power Company where he quickly established himself as a vital member of their team by going on to win the 2012 Intercity Football League title with them as well as personally winning the player of the season and top goalscorer award along the way. Beijing Enterprises became interested in Wen Chih-hao again and he joined them before the start of the 2013 China League One season. Wen Chih-hao left Beijing BSU after the 2021 season.

== Personal life ==
Wen is a graduate from North Gate high school and whose parents are both full-blood Bunun people.

== Career statistics ==
=== Club career statistics ===
Statistics accurate as of match played 31 December 2020.

Appearances and goals by club, season and competition
Club	Season	League			National Cup		Continental		Other		Total	
Club	Season	Division	Apps	Goals	Apps	Goals	Apps	Goals	Apps	Goals	Apps	Goals
Taiwan Power Company	2012	Intercity Football League	12	8	-		4	0	-		16	8
Beijing Enterprises Group	2013	China League One	23	0	0	0	-		-		23	0
Beijing Enterprises Group	2014	China League One	29	3	0	0	-		-		29	3
Beijing Enterprises Group	2015	China League One	16	1	3	0	-		-		19	1
Beijing Enterprises Group	2016	China League One	26	3	2	0	-		-		28	3
Beijing Enterprises Group	2017	China League One	19	4	1	0	-		-		20	4
Beijing Enterprises Group	2018	China League One	19	2	0	0	-		-		19	2
Beijing Enterprises Group	2019	China League One	30	6	0	0	-		-		30	6
Beijing Enterprises Group	2020	China League One	8	1	-		-		-		8	1
Beijing Enterprises Group	Total		170	20	6	0	0	0	0	0	176	20
Career total			182	28	6	0	4	0	0	0	192	28

== International goals ==
=== U19 ===
No.	Date	Venue	Opponent	Score	Result	Competition
1.	10 November 2011	Thephasadin Stadium, Bangkok, Thailand	Guam	1–0	11–0	2012 AFC U-19 Championship qualification
2.	10 November 2011	Thephasadin Stadium, Bangkok, Thailand	Guam	2–0	11–0	2012 AFC U-19 Championship qualification
3.	10 November 2011	Thephasadin Stadium, Bangkok, Thailand	Guam	4–0	11–0	2012 AFC U-19 Championship qualification
4.	10 November 2011	Thephasadin Stadium, Bangkok, Thailand	Guam	8–0	11–0	2012 AFC U-19 Championship qualification

=== U23 ===
No.	Date	Venue	Opponent	Score	Result	Competition
1.	23 June 2012	Bogyoke Aung San Stadium, Yangon, Myanmar	Vietnam	2–1	2–1	2013 AFC U-22 Championship qualification

=== National team ===
As of match played 5 September 2019. Chinese Taipei score listed first, score column indicates score after each Wen Chih-hao goal.

International goals by date, venue, cap, opponent, score, result, and competition
No.	Date	Venue	Cap	Opponent	Score	Result	Competition
1	3 September 2015	Shahid Dastgerdi Stadium, Ekbatan, Iran	12	Iraq	1–3	1–5	2018 FIFA World Cup qualification
2	9 October 2015	Taipei Municipal Stadium, Taipei, Taiwan	14	Macau	1–1	5–1	Friendly
3	4 December 2017	Taipei Municipal Stadium, Taipei, Taiwan	31	Timor-Leste	1–0	3–1	2017 CTFA International Tournament
4	5 September 2019	Taipei Municipal Stadium, Taipei, Taiwan	41	Jordan	1–2	1–2	2022 FIFA World Cup qualification

== Honours ==
=== Club ===
Taiwan Power Company

Winner

- Intercity Football League: 2012

=== Individual ===
Awards

- League best player of the season: 2012

Performances

- League top-goalscorer: 2012
