= 1991 Chinese Taipei National Football League =

Statistics of Chinese Taipei National Football League in the 1991 season.

== Overview ==
Taipei City Bank won the championship.
