= 2014 Intercity Football League =

Intercity Football League
- Season: 2014

The 2014 Intercity Football League (known as the MediaTek Intercity Football League for sponsorship reasons) was the eighth season of the Intercity Football League since its establishment in 2007. The season began on 7 June 2014， Taipei City Tatung were the defending champions.

== Clubs ==
A total of 8 clubs will contest the league, including five sides from the 2013 season and three new clubs.

=== Stadia and locations ===
Note: Table lists in alphabetical order.

Team	Stadium	Location	Capacity
Air Source Development	Tainan Football Field	Tainan	2,000
Ming Chuan University	Taipei Municipal Stadium	Taipei	20,000
National Sports Training Center	Tainan Football Field	Tainan	2,000
Taichung City Dragon	Tainan Football Field	Tainan	2,000
Tainan City	Tainan Football Field	Tainan	2,000
Chiayi County			
Taipei City Tatung	Taipei Municipal Stadium	Taipei	20,000
Taiwan Power Company	Kaohsiung National Stadium	Kaohsiung City	40,350

== Preliminary stage ==
The preliminary stage are held from May 16 to 18, 2014. All three matches are held in Bailing Stadium.

Pos	Team	Pld	W	D	L	GF	GA	GD	Pts	ASD	CYF	RB
1	Air Source Development	2	2	0	0	8	3	+5	6		4–2	4–1
2	Chiayi County	2	1	0	1	7	7	0	3			5–3
3	Royal Blues	2	0	0	2	4	9	−5	0			

Legend: Blue = home team win; Yellow = draw; Red = away team win.

The top two team qualified to the "2014 Intercity Football League".

== Standings and results ==
This season is divided into two half seasons, every team have their own home venue. Each half season's champion will have a final match to determine which is the final champion. If each half season's champion are the same team, then this team would be the champion of 2014 season.

These are the results for all the 2014 seasons.

Home \ Away	ASD	MCU	NST	TCD	TC	CYF	TCT	TPW
Air Source Development		0–0	1–5	1–3	3–1	2–2	0–2	1–5
Ming Chuan University	0–1		2–2	3–3	2–0	2–1	1–3	1–5
National Sports Training Center	5–2	1–1		0–3	5–2	6–4	2–1	0–5
Taichung City Dragon	7–0	0–1	1–2		6–0	9–0	2–2	1–1
Tainan City	1–2	1–3	1–7	0–2		4–2	0–2	0–5
Chiayi County	0–2	0–6	2–7	0–11	2–2		1–7	0–5
Taipei City Tatung	1–1	1–1	2–2	2–4	11–1	7–1		2–2
Taiwan Power Company	5–0	1–0	1–2	2–0	1–0	8–1	4–2	

Updated to match(es) played on 7 June 2014. Source: MediaTek Intercity Football League
Legend: Blue = home team win; Yellow = draw; Red = away team win.

=== First half ===
Pos	Team	Pld	W	D	L	GF	GA	GD	Pts	Qualification
1	Taiwan Power Company	7	6	0	1	26	7	+19	18	First Half's Winner
2	National Sports Training Center	7	5	2	0	27	10	+17	17	
3	Taichung City Dragon	7	4	1	2	26	10	+16	13	
4	Taipei City Tatung	7	3	2	2	27	13	+14	11	
5	Ming Chuan University	7	2	4	1	12	13	−1	10	
6	Air Source Development	7	2	1	4	7	16	−9	7	
7	Tainan City	7	1	0	6	8	32	−24	3	
8	Chiayi County	7	0	0	7	7	39	−32	0	

Updated to match(es) played on 7 June 2014. Source: MediaTek Intercity Football League
Rules for classification: 1) points; 2) goal difference; 3) number of goals scored.

=== Second half ===
Pos	Team	Pld	W	D	L	GF	GA	GD	Pts	Qualification
1	Taiwan Power Company	7	5	2	0	24	3	+21	17	Second Half's Winner
2	Taichung City Dragon	7	4	2	1	26	4	+22	14	
3	National Sports Training Center	7	4	1	2	19	18	+1	13	
4	Taipei City Tatung	7	3	3	1	18	9	+9	12	
5	Ming Chuan University	7	3	1	3	11	6	+5	10	
6	Air Source Development	7	2	2	3	9	21	−12	8	
7	Chiayi County	7	0	2	5	9	39	−30	2	
8	Tainan City	7	0	1	6	5	21	−16	1	

== Final match ==
The winners from each season will play a match to determine which is the champion of 2014 season, and enter the 2015 AFC Cup play-off stage. As the winners from each season are the same team, so Taiwan Power Company win the 2015 AFC Cup play-off slot. However, due to their low AFC MAs' ranking, they can not participate in this tournament.
