= 1984 Chinese Taipei National Football League =

Statistics of Chinese Taipei National Football League in the 1984 season.

== Overview ==
Flying Camel won the championship.
