= 1986 Chinese Taipei National Football League =

Statistics of Chinese Taipei National Football League in the 1986 season.

== Overview ==
Taipei City Bank won the championship.
