= 1997 Chinese Taipei National Football League =

Statistics of the Chinese Taipei National Football League for the 1997 season.

== Overview ==
It was contested by 8 teams, and Taipower won the championship.

== League standings ==
Pos	Team	Pld	W	D	L	GF	GA	GD	Pts
1	Taipower	14	12	2	0	41	11	+30	38
2	Tatung	14	8	4	2	30	11	+19	28
3	Taiwan P.E. College	14	6	3	5	19	15	+4	21
4	Taipei City Bank	14	6	3	5	15	15	0	21
5	Lukuang	14	6	0	8	19	26	−7	18
6	Flying Camel	14	4	2	8	12	22	−10	14
7	Ming Chuan University	14	2	3	9	11	27	−16	9
8	Taipei P.E. College	14	1	5	8	7	29	−22	8

Source: rsssf.com
