= 1988 Chinese Taipei National Football League =

Statistics of Chinese Taipei National Football League in the 1988 season.

== Overview ==
Flying Camel won the championship.
