= Chang Wu-yeh =

Taiwanese football manager

Personal information
- Full name: Chang Wu-yeh (張武業)
- Date of birth: 19 December 1978 (age 47)
- Place of birth: Taichung County (now part of Taichung City), Republic of China (Taiwan)
- Height: 1.76 m (5 ft 9 1/2 in)
- Positions: Defender; midfielder

Team information
- Current team: Kuala Lumpur FA
- Number: 9

Senior career*
Years	Team	Apps	(Gls)
1996	Taipei City Bank	3	(1)
1996–?	Flying Camel		
?–1998	NSTC		
1998–2005	Taipei P.E. College		
2007	Tatung	5	(1)
2008	Taipei P.E. College		
2013	Kuala Lumpur FA		

International career
2001–2008	Chinese Taipei		

Managerial career
- 2009–present: Taipei P.E. College
- * Club domestic league appearances and goals as of April 15, 2007

Chang Wu-yeh (Chinese: 張武業; pinyin: Zhāng Wǔyè; born 19 December 1978 in Taichung County (now part of Taichung City)) is a Taiwanese football manager and former player. He currently manages Taipei Physical Education College's football team.

== Playing career ==
Chang, unlike many of his teammates who have played football since young ages, he started his football career at the age of 14. After graduating from junior high school, he was enrolled into National Dajia Industrial Senior High School (Chinese: 大甲高級工業職業學校). He performed well in domestic youth competitions. He also played for the Taipei City Bank F.C. in the Chinese Taipei National Football League when he was 18.

However, he did not pass the entrance examination of Taipei Physical Education College. He chose to serve military service and was able to play for military-organized Flying Camel and National Sports Training Center football team due to his experience in Taipei City Bank F.C.

After completing the military service, Chang entered Taipei Physical Education College in 1998.

In 2001, he was called up to represent the Chinese Taipei national football team in the 2002 FIFA World Cup qualification rounds.

== Managerial career ==
Since December 2005, he has been appointed assistant coach to Chinese Taipei national football team under then head coach Toshiaki Imai. He became Taipei Physical Education College football team's head coach in 2009.

== Honours ==
- Chinese Taipei National Football League Golden Shoe: 2004
