= 1993 Chinese Taipei National Football League =

Football tournament season

Statistics of Chinese Taipei National Football League in the 1993 season.

== Overview ==
Flying Camel won the championship.
