= 1983 Chinese Taipei National Football League =

Statistics of the Chinese Taipei National Football League for the 1983 season.

== Overview ==
Flying Camel won the championship.
