= 1992 Chinese Taipei National Football League =

Statistics of Chinese Taipei National Football League in the 1992 season.

== Overview ==
Taipower won the championship.
