= Huang Che-ming =

Taiwanese footballer and manager

Personal information
- Full name: Huang Che-ming (黃哲明)
- Date of birth: 12 June 1972 (age 54)
- Place of birth: Republic of China
- Height: 1.82 m (6 ft 0 in)
- Position: Center forward

Team information
- Current team: Taipower (head coach)

Senior career*
Years	Team	Apps	(Gls)
1990–2004	Taipower		

International career
1991–2004	Chinese Taipei	25	(6)

Managerial career
- 1999–?: Chung Shan
- 2023–: Taipower
- 2025: Chinese Taipei
- * Club domestic league appearances and goals

Huang Che-ming (Chinese: 黃哲明; born 12 June 1972) is a Taiwanese football (soccer) manager and former player. He is the current head coach of both Taipower.

== Player career ==
In 1990, after graduating from senior high school, he joined Taiwan Power Company F.C. (Taipower), in which he was one of the members achieving the club's ten consecutive league championships. In Taipower, he had played in several different positions, from striker, midfielder, to center back. Nevertheless, his best position was center forward. He had been main goalscorer in the Chinese Taipei national football team and the futsal team. He retired from player career in 2004.

== Coaching career ==
Huang managed women's football team of Chung San Industrial and Commercial School. Currently he is the head coach of Taipower From August to October 2025, he served as Chinese Taipei national team head coach.

== Career statistics ==
=== International ===
Appearances and goals by national team and year
National team	Year	Apps	Goals
Chinese Taipei	1996	1	1
Chinese Taipei	1997	5	1
Chinese Taipei	1998	0	0
Chinese Taipei	1999	0	0
Chinese Taipei	2000	4	0
Chinese Taipei	2001	6	0
Chinese Taipei	2002	0	0
Chinese Taipei	2003	6	4
Chinese Taipei	2004	2	0
Total		25	6

No.	Date	Venue	Cap	Opponent	Score	Result	Competition
1.	4 August 1996	Hồ Chí Minh City, Vietnam	1	Vietnam	1–1	4–1	1996 AFC Asian Cup qualification
2.	18 March 1997	Shah Alam Stadium, Shah Alam, Malaysia	3	Bangladesh	1–1	3–1	1998 FIFA World Cup qualification
3.	26 February 2003	Causeway Bay, Hong Kong	19	Mongolia	1–0	4–0	2003 East Asian Football Championship
4.	26 February 2003	Causeway Bay, Hong Kong	19	Mongolia	2–0	4–0	2003 East Asian Football Championship
5.	2 March 2003	Causeway Bay, Hong Kong	21	Macau	2–1	2–1	2003 East Asian Football Championship
6.	23 March 2003	Causeway Bay, Hong Kong	22	Timor-Leste	1–0	3–0	2003 East Asian Football Championship

== Honours ==
With Taiwan Power Company F.C.

- National First Division Football League
  - Champions: 1994, 1995, 1996, 1997, 1998, 1999, 2000–01, 2001–02, 2002–03, 2004
  - Runners-up: 1993
- CTFA Cup
  - Champions: 1997, 2000, 2002
