= 2001–02 Chinese Taipei National Football League =

Statistics of the Chinese Taipei National Football League in the 2001–02 season.

== Overview ==
Taipower won the championship.
