= Taiwan national football team results =

- Win Draw Loss

This page details the match results and statistics of the Taiwan national football team. (Note: The Chinese Taipei Football Association joined FIFA in 1954 and originally entered a national team under the name Taiwan. In 1982, the national team was renamed Chinese Taipei. For results after 1982, see Chinese Taipei national football team results.)

== Key ==
Key to matches

- Att. = Match attendance
- (H) = Home ground
- (A) = Away ground
- (N) = Neutral ground

Key to record by opponent

- Pld = Games played
- W = Games won
- D = Games drawn
- L = Games lost
- GF = Goals for
- GA = Goals against

== A-International results ==
Taiwan's score is shown first in each case.

Taiwan national football team results
No.	Date	Venue	Opponents	Score	Competition	Taiwan scorers	Att.	Ref.
1	1 May 1954	Rizal Memorial Stadium, Manila (N)	South Vietnam	3–2	1954 Asian Games	Lee Tai-fai, Zhu Yongqiang, Yiu Cheuk Yin	—	
2	6 May 1954	Rizal Memorial Stadium, Manila (N)	Philippines	4–0	1954 Asian Games	Jin Lusheng, Zhu Yongqiang (2), Li Dahui	—	
3	7 May 1954	Rizal Memorial Stadium, Manila (N)	Indonesia	4–2	1954 Asian Games	Lee Tai-fai (2), Yiu Cheuk Yin, Zhu Yongqiang	—	
4	8 May 1954	Rizal Memorial Stadium, Manila (N)	South Korea	5–2	1954 Asian Games	Yiu Cheuk Yin, Zhu Yongqiang (2), Szeto, Ho Ying-fan	—	
5	26 August 1956	Seoul Stadium, Seoul (A)	South Korea	0–2	1956 AFC Asian Cup qualification		35,000	
6	2 September 1956	Municipal Stadium, Taipei (H)	South Korea	1–2	1956 AFC Asian Cup qualification	Zhu Yongqiang	20,000	
7	25 May 1958	Tokyo (N)	Malaya	2–1	1958 Asian Games	Ho Ying Fun, Wong Chi-keung	—	
8	27 May 1958	Tokyo (N)	Pakistan	3–1	1958 Asian Games	Ho Ying Fun, Law Kwok-tai, Mok Chun Wah	2,000	
9	30 May 1958	Tokyo Football Stadium, Tokyo (N)	Israel	2–0	1958 Asian Games	Law Kwok-tai, Mok Chun Wah	—	
10	31 May 1958	National Stadium, Tokyo (N)	Indonesia	1–0	1958 Asian Games	Chow Siu-hung	—	
11	1 June 1958	National Stadium, Tokyo (N)	South Korea	3–2 (a.e.t.)	1958 Asian Games	Yiu Cheuk Yin, Lau Yee, Chan Fai Hung	—	
12	31 March 1959	Rizal Memorial Stadium, Manila (N)	Philippines	7–4	1960 AFC Asian Cup qualification	Unknown	12,000	
13	3 April 1959	Rizal Memorial Stadium, Manila (N)	Hong Kong	7–4	1960 AFC Asian Cup qualification	Law Kwok-tai (3), Lam Sheung Yee, Yang Weiyu (2), Huang Zhiqiang	22,000	
14	30 August 1959	Bangkok (A)	Thailand	3–1	1960 Summer Olympics qualification	Unknown	—	
15	13 September 1959	Taipei (H)	Thailand	3–1	1960 Summer Olympics qualification	Unknown	—	
16	25 April 1960	Taipei (H)	South Korea	1–2	1960 Summer Olympics qualification	Wong Chi-keung	—	
17	30 April 1960	Taipei (H)	South Korea	2–0	1960 Summer Olympics qualification	Wong Chi-keung	—	
18	18 August 1960	Rome (N)	Tunisia	1–8	Friendly	Unknown	2,000	
19	16 October 1960	Hyochang Stadium, Seoul (N)	South Vietnam	2–0	1960 AFC Asian Cup	Luk Man Wai, Yiu Cheuk Yin	—	
20	21 October 1960	Hyochang Stadium, Seoul (A)	South Korea	0–1	1960 AFC Asian Cup		—	
21	23 October 1960	Hyochang Stadium, Seoul (N)	Israel	0–1	1960 AFC Asian Cup		—	
22	14 July 1962	Saigon (A)	South Vietnam	1–1	Friendly	Unknown	–	
23	25 July 1962	Thailand (A)	Thailand	0–4	Friendly		–	
24	27 July 1962	Singapore (A)	Singapore	2–2	Friendly	Unknown	–	
25	28 July 1962	Singapore (A)	Singapore	4–0	Friendly	Unknown	–	
26	22 August 1962	Singapore (A)	Singapore	1–0	Friendly	Unknown	–	
27	9 August 1963	Merdeka Stadium, Kuala Lumpur (N)	South Vietnam	1–1	1963 Merdeka Tournament	Unknown	–	
28	12 August 1963	Merdeka Stadium, Kuala Lumpur (A)	Malaya	3–2	1963 Merdeka Tournament	Unknown	–	
29	15 August 1963	Merdeka Stadium, Kuala Lumpur (N)	Japan	2–0	1963 Merdeka Tournament	Kwok Kam-hung, Yue Chuk-ying	–	
30	16 August 1963	Merdeka Stadium, Kuala Lumpur (N)	Thailand	2–2	1963 Merdeka Tournament	Unknown	–	
31	18 August 1963	Merdeka Stadium, Kuala Lumpur (N)	South Korea	1–0	1963 Merdeka Tournament	Unknown	–	
32	27 November 1963	Hyochang Stadium, Seoul (A)	South Korea	1–2	1964 Summer Olympics qualification	Cho Nam-soo (o.g.)	20,000	
33	7 December 1963	Taipei Municipal Stadium, Taipei (H)	South Korea	1–0	1964 Summer Olympics qualification	Wong Man-wai	–	
34	22 August 1964	Merdeka Stadium, Kuala Lumpur (N)	Cambodia	4–0	1964 Merdeka Tournament	Unknown	–	
35	27 August 1964	Merdeka Stadium, Kuala Lumpur (N)	Burma	4–2	1964 Merdeka Tournament	Unknown	–	
36	29 August 1964	Merdeka Stadium, Kuala Lumpur (N)	South Vietnam	0–0	1964 Merdeka Tournament		–	
37	2 September 1964	Merdeka Stadium, Kuala Lumpur (A)	Malaysia	2–5	1964 Merdeka Tournament	Unknown	–	
38	5 September 1964	Merdeka Stadium, Kuala Lumpur (N)	Japan	2–2	1964 Merdeka Tournament	Unknown	–	
39	14 August 1965	Merdeka Stadium, Kuala Lumpur (N)	South Vietnam	2–5	1965 Merdeka Tournament	Unknown	–	
40	17 August 1965	Merdeka Stadium, Kuala Lumpur (N)	Burma	1–3	1965 Merdeka Tournament	Unknown	–	
41	19 August 1965	Merdeka Stadium, Kuala Lumpur (N)	Japan	4–0	1965 Merdeka Tournament	Unknown	–	
42	22 August 1965	Merdeka Stadium, Kuala Lumpur (N)	Thailand	3–2	1965 Merdeka Tournament	Unknown	–	
43	28 August 1965	Merdeka Stadium, Kuala Lumpur (N)	South Korea	1–1	1965 Merdeka Tournament	Unknown	–	
44	15 August 1966	Merdeka Stadium, Kuala Lumpur (N)	Thailand	2–1	1966 Merdeka Tournament	Unknown	–	
45	18 August 1966	Merdeka Stadium, Kuala Lumpur (N)	Singapore	1–4	1966 Merdeka Tournament	Unknown	–	
46	22 August 1966	Merdeka Stadium, Kuala Lumpur (N)	South Vietnam	0–3	1966 Merdeka Tournament		–	
47	24 August 1966	Merdeka Stadium, Kuala Lumpur (N)	India	0–1	1966 Merdeka Tournament		–	
48	26 August 1966	Merdeka Stadium, Kuala Lumpur (N)	Japan	2–5	1966 Merdeka Tournament	Unknown	–	
49	12 December 1966	Bangkok (N)	South Vietnam	1–2	1966 Asian Games	Unknown	–	
50	13 December 1966	Bangkok (N)	Singapore	3–3	1966 Asian Games	Unknown	–	
51	14 December 1966	Bangkok (N)	Indonesia	1–3	1966 Asian Games	Unknown	–	
52	28 July 1967	Taipei Municipal Stadium, Taipei (H)	Philippines	9–0	1968 AFC Asian Cup qualification	Unknown	–	
53	30 July 1967	Taipei Municipal Stadium, Taipei (H)	Japan	2–2	1968 AFC Asian Cup qualification	Unknown	–	
54	3 August 1967	Taipei Municipal Stadium, Taipei (H)	Indonesia	3–2	1968 AFC Asian Cup qualification	Wong Chi-keung, Mok Chun-wah, Cheung Chi-day	–	
55	7 August 1967	Taipei Municipal Stadium, Taipei (H)	South Korea	1–0	1968 AFC Asian Cup qualification	Lam Sheung Yee	–	
56	11 August 1967	Merdeka Stadium, Kuala Lumpur (N)	Singapore	3–3	1967 Merdeka Tournament	Unknown	–	
57	15 August 1967	Merdeka Stadium, Kuala Lumpur (N)	Indonesia	1–2	1967 Merdeka Tournament	Unknown	–	
58	18 August 1967	Merdeka Stadium, Kuala Lumpur (N)	South Korea	1–2	1967 Merdeka Tournament	Unknown	–	
59	20 August 1967	Merdeka Stadium, Kuala Lumpur (N)	Burma	2–1	1967 Merdeka Tournament	Unknown	–	
60	22 August 1967	Merdeka Stadium, Kuala Lumpur (N)	India	1–1	1967 Merdeka Tournament	Cheung Chi Wai	–	
61	25 August 1967	Merdeka Stadium, Kuala Lumpur (N)	Hong Kong	4–2	1967 Merdeka Tournament	Unknown	–	
62	28 September 1967	Tokyo (N)	South Korea	2–4	1968 Summer Olympics qualification	Tsang King-hung, Cheung Chi Wai	–	
63	30 September 1967	Yoyogi National Stadium, Tokyo (A)	Japan	0–4	1968 Summer Olympics qualification		7,181	
64	3 October 1967	Tokyo (N)	Philippines	7–2	1968 Summer Olympics qualification	Unknown	–	
65	7 October 1967	Tokyo (N)	South Vietnam	0–3	1968 Summer Olympics qualification		–	
66	9 October 1967	Yoyogi National Stadium, Tokyo (N)	Lebanon	2–5	1968 Summer Olympics qualification	Law Kwok-tai, Tsang Hing-hung	–	
67	11 May 1968	Amjadieh Stadium, Tehran (N)	Burma	1–1	1968 AFC Asian Cup	Wong Chi-keung	6,000	
68	13 May 1968	Amjadieh Stadium, Tehran (A)	Iran	0–4	1968 AFC Asian Cup		25,000	
69	15 May 1968	Amjadieh Stadium, Tehran (N)	Hong Kong	1–1	1968 AFC Asian Cup	Mak Tian-fu	3,000	
70	17 May 1968	Amjadieh Stadium, Tehran (N)	Israel	1–4	1968 AFC Asian Cup	Li Huan-wen	20,000	
71	11 August 1968	Merdeka Stadium, Kuala Lumpur (N)	Singapore	2–0	1968 Merdeka Tournament	Unknown	–	
72	14 August 1968	Merdeka Stadium, Kuala Lumpur (N)	South Korea	1–2	1968 Merdeka Tournament	Chan Chiu-ki	–	
73	19 August 1968	Merdeka Stadium, Kuala Lumpur (N)	Indonesia	1–10	1968 Merdeka Tournament	Chan Chiu-ki	–	
74	30 July 1970	Merdeka Stadium, Kuala Lumpur (N)	India	1–0	1970 Merdeka Tournament	Hu San Wah	–	
75	1 August 1970	Merdeka Stadium, Kuala Lumpur (N)	South Vietnam	2–1	1970 Merdeka Tournament	Unknown	–	
76	4 August 1970	Merdeka Stadium, Kuala Lumpur (A)	Malaysia	1–3	1970 Merdeka Tournament	Unknown	–	
77	7 August 1970	Merdeka Stadium, Kuala Lumpur (N)	Burma	1–1	1970 Merdeka Tournament	Unknown	–	
78	26 August 1970	Merdeka Stadium, Kuala Lumpur (N)	Japan	2–3	1970 Merdeka Tournament	Mac Ting Hu, Chan Chiu-ki	–	
79	6 August 1971	Merdeka Stadium, Kuala Lumpur (A)	Malaysia	0–0	1971 Merdeka Tournament		–	
80	8 August 1971	Merdeka Stadium, Kuala Lumpur (N)	Thailand	4–0	1971 Merdeka Tournament	Tsang Keng Hong, Chan Chiu-ki, Cheung Chi Doy, Cheung Chi Wai	–	
81	12 August 1971	Merdeka Stadium, Kuala Lumpur (N)	South Vietnam	3–2	1971 Merdeka Tournament	Ho Sun Wah, Leung Siu Wah, Chan Chiu-ki	–	
82	18 August 1971	Merdeka Stadium, Kuala Lumpur (N)	Indonesia	0–1	1971 Merdeka Tournament		16,500	
83	25 September 1971	Seoul (N)	Philippines	0–3	1972 Summer Olympics qualification		–	
84	27 September 1971	Seoul (N)	Malaysia	0–3	1972 Summer Olympics qualification		–	
85	29 September 1971	Seoul (N)	Japan	1–5	1972 Summer Olympics qualification	Lee Fu-Tsai	–	
86	29 September 1971	Seoul (A)	South Korea	0–8	1972 Summer Olympics qualification		–	
87	3 November 1974	Cộng Hòa Stadium, Saigon (N)	Malaysia	0–0	1974 South Vietnam Independence Cup		–	
88	5 November 1974	Cộng Hòa Stadium, Saigon (N)	Laos	2–1	1974 South Vietnam Independence Cup	Unknown	–	
89	7 November 1974	Cộng Hòa Stadium, Saigon (N)	South Vietnam	1–1	1974 South Vietnam Independence Cup	Unknown	–	
90	10 November 1974	Cộng Hòa Stadium, Saigon (N)	Thailand	3–2	1974 South Vietnam Independence Cup	Unknown	–	
91	24 March 1975	Taipei (H)	Panama	1–1	Friendly	Unknown	–	
92	31 March 1975	Hualien City (H)	Panama	1–1	Friendly	Unknown	–	
93	25 May 1975	Taiwan (H)	Lebanon	0–2	Friendly		–	
94	14 December 1975	Kaohsiung (H)	South Korea	0–2	1976 Summer Olympics qualification		–	
95	6 March 1976	Seoul (N)	South Korea	0–3	1976 Summer Olympics qualification		–	
96	8 April 1976	Aloha Stadium, Honolulu (N)	Philippines	0–1	Aloha Soccer Festival		21,705	
97	16 March 1977	Govind Park, Ba (N)	Australia	0–3	1978 FIFA World Cup qualification		–	
98	19 March 1977	Govind Park, Ba (N)	Australia	1–2	1978 FIFA World Cup qualification	Fang Shin-sing	–	
99	19 March 1977	Mount Smart Stadium, Auckland (A)	New Zealand	0–6	1978 FIFA World Cup qualification		–	
100	23 March 1977	Mount Smart Stadium, Auckland (H)	New Zealand	0–6	1978 FIFA World Cup qualification		–	
101	27 November 1979	Taipei (H)	Australia	0–2	Friendly		2,000	

Notes

1. A: The match was abandoned in the 23rd minute with the Republic of China (Taiwan) leading 1–0 after Korean players and officials attacked the referee in response to a penalty being given against them; the match was awarded to the Republic of China (Taiwan) 2–0.
2. B: The play-off was awarded to South Korea, as Taiwan were disqualified due to objecting to playing at a neutral venue and refused to travel.
3. C: Taiwan played five matches at the 1968 Merdeka Tournament, however only three were against full international sides. The other matches against Western Australia and Japan B is considered an unofficial matches.
4. D: Taiwan played six matches at the 1970 Merdeka Tournament, however only five were against full international sides. The other match against Western Australia is considered an unofficial match.
5. E: Taiwan played seven matches at the 1971 Merdeka Tournament, however only four were against full international sides. The other matches against Japan B and South Korea B (twice) is considered an unofficial matches.
6. F: Taiwan played six matches at the 1974 South Vietnam Independence Cup, however only five were against full international sides. The other match against Persipura Jayapura is considered an unofficial match.
7. G: Both matches between Australia and Taiwan were played on neutral ground.
8. H: Despite being played in New Zealand, this was officially a home match for Taiwan.

== Record by opponent ==
Team	Pld	W	D	L	GF	GA	GD	WPCT
Australia	3	0	0	3	1	7	−6	0.00
Cambodia	1	1	0	0	4	0	+4	100.00
Hong Kong	3	2	1	0	12	7	+5	66.67
India	3	1	1	1	2	2	0	33.33
Indonesia	7	3	0	4	7	20	−13	42.86
Iran	1	0	0	1	0	4	−4	0.00
Israel	3	1	0	2	3	5	−2	33.33
Japan	8	2	2	4	15	21	−6	25.00
Laos	1	1	0	0	2	1	+1	100.00
Lebanon	2	0	0	2	2	7	−5	0.00
Malaysia (Note: Includes results as Malaya.)	7	2	2	3	8	14	−6	28.57
Myanmar (Note: Includes results as Burma.)	5	2	2	1	9	8	+1	40.00
New Zealand	2	0	0	2	0	12	−12	0.00
Pakistan	1	1	0	0	3	1	+2	100.00
Panama	2	0	2	0	2	2	0	0.00
Philippines	6	4	0	2	27	10	+17	66.67
Singapore	7	3	3	1	16	12	+4	42.86
South Korea	18	6	1	11	21	35	−14	33.33
South Vietnam	12	4	4	4	16	21	−5	33.33
Thailand	8	6	1	1	20	13	+7	75.00
Tunisia	1	0	0	1	1	8	−7	0.00
Total	101	39	19	43	171	210	−39	38.61

Source: Results
