= 2002–03 Chinese Taipei National Football League =

Statistics of the Chinese Taipei National Football League for the 2002–03 season.

== Overview ==
Taipower won the championship.
