= Yilan County F.C. =

Taiwanese football club

Yilan County Football Club is an association football club from Taiwan. They played at the Intercity Football League in Taiwan, which is semi-professional. Their home stadium is 15,000 capacity Yilan County Stadium.
