= Taipei City Dragons F.C. =

Taiwanese football club

Taipei City Dragons FC
- Full name: Taipei City Dragons Football Club
- Ground: Tainan Football Field
- Capacity: 2,000
- League: Intercity Football League

Taipei City Dragons Football Club, also known as TC Dragons, is an amateur football club from Tainan, Taiwan. It is one of the main association football clubs in Taiwan. 2,000 capacity Tainan Football Field is their home stadium.

== Field ==
Taipei City Dragons FC's home stadium is the Tainan Football Field, in Tainan, Taiwan. It has a capacity of about 2000 people.
