= 2013 Intercity Football League =

Intercity Football League
- Season: 2013
- Matches: 70
- Goals: 150 (2.14 per match)
- Biggest home win: Taichung City Dragon 6–0 Taipei City Dragons (1 June 2013)
- Biggest away win: Taipei City Dragons 1–9 Taipei City Tatung (11 March 2013)
- Highest scoring: National Sports Training Center 6–4 Taipei City Dragons (16 June 2013)
- Longest winning run: 9 games Taipei City Tatung
- Longest unbeaten run: 9 games Taipei City Tatung
- Longest losing run: 8 games Taipei City Dragons

The 2013 Intercity Football League (known as the MediaTek Intercity Football League for sponsorship reasons) was the seventh season of the Intercity Football League since its establishment in 2007. The season began on 11 May 2013 and will end on 16 November 2013. Taiwan Power Company were the defending champions, having won the league for the 4th time last season.

== Clubs ==
A total of 8 clubs will contest the league, including five sides from the 2012 season and three new clubs.

=== Stadia and locations ===
Note: Table lists in alphabetical order.

Team	Stadium	Location	Capacity
Air Source Development	Tainan Football Field	Tainan	2,000
Ming Chuan University	Taipei Municipal Stadium	Taipei	20,000
National Sports Training Center	Tainan Football Field	Tainan	2,000
Taichung City Dragon	Tainan Football Field	Tainan	2,000
Tainan City Dragon	Tainan Football Field	Tainan	2,000
Taipei City Dragons	Tainan Football Field	Tainan	2,000
Taipei City Tatung	Taipei Municipal Stadium	Taipei	20,000
Taiwan Power Company	Kaohsiung National Stadium	Kaohsiung City	40,350

== Standings ==
Pos	Team	Pld	W	D	L	GF	GA	GD	Pts	Qualification or relegation
1	Taipei City Tatung (C)	14	10	2	2	40	20	+20	32	Qualification for 2014 AFC President's Cup
2	Taiwan Power Company	14	10	1	3	50	17	+33	31	
3	Taichung City Dragon	14	10	1	3	44	14	+30	31	
4	Ming Chuan University	14	4	5	5	28	28	0	17	
5	National Sports Training Center	14	4	5	5	29	35	−6	17	
6	Tainan City	14	3	6	5	28	33	−5	15	
7	Air Source Development	14	1	4	9	16	42	−26	7	
8	Taipei City Dragons	14	0	4	10	15	61	−46	4	

Updated to match(es) played on 14 September 2013. Source: MediaTek Intercity Football League
Rules for classification: 1) points; 2) goal difference; 3) number of goals scored.
(C) Champions

== Results ==
Home \ Away	ASD	MCU	NST	TCD	TC	TPC	TCT	TPW
Air Source Development					2–2		0–2	1–6
Ming Chuan University	4–1		2–2	0–4				
National Sports Training Center	2–2			0–6		6–4		1–5
Taichung City Dragon	0–2					6–0	1–2	
Tainan City			2–1	3–6		2–1		
Taipei City Dragons		0–5					1–9	0–7
Taipei City Tatung		2–1	3–1		4–2			
Taiwan Power Company		4–2		2–0	1–1			

Updated to match(es) played on 24 July 2013. Source: MediaTek Intercity Football League
Legend: Blue = home team win; Yellow = draw; Red = away team win.
