= 2000–01 Chinese Taipei National Football League =

Statistics of the Chinese Taipei National Football League for the 2000–01 season.

== Overview ==
It was contested by 7 teams, and Taipower won the championship.

== League standings ==
Pos	Team	Pld	W	D	L	GF	GA	GD	Pts
1	Taipower	12	9	3	0	41	7	+34	30
2	Tatung	12	8	3	1	40	11	+29	27
3	Wei Dan (Note: National Taiwan College of Physical Education football team participated under the name of sponsored Vedan Enterprise Corporation (Wei Dan).)	12	6	1	5	27	15	+12	19
4	Taiwan P.E. College	12	4	3	5	29	26	+3	15
5	Ilan Youth	12	4	3	5	24	28	−4	15
6	Ming Chuan University	12	2	1	9	11	43	−32	7
7	Taipei City Bank	12	2	0	10	19	59	−40	6

Source: rsssf.com
