= Thunderbird Soccer Club =

Taiwanese football club

Thunderbird Soccer Club (Chinese: 雷鳥足球俱樂部; pinyin: Léiniǎo Zúqiú Jùlèbù) is a Taiwanese football (soccer) club based in Kaohsiung. They play at the Kaohsiung Football Stadium with a capacity of 5,000.

== History ==
Thunderbird Soccer Team (Chinese: 雷鳥足球隊) was founded in 1968 by a group of high school students favoring the sport. Initially they took part in regional competitions in southern Taiwan. In 1970, they first participated in the National Youth Cup in Taipei and eventually won the championship. They obtained the second National Youth Cup title in the next year, followed by another National Youth Cup in 1973 and CTFA Cup in 1976. Several Thunderbird players were called up to the Chinese Taipei national football team.

In the end of 1982, Chinese Taipei Football Association founded the National Football League, and Thunderbird was one of the 7 founding members along with Flying Camel, Taipower, Taipei City Bank, Lukuang, Taipei Physical Education College, and Taiwan Provincial College of Physical Education. Unlike other teams with school, military, or state-owned enterprise backgrounds, Thunderbird was the only team run by private organization. Their players came from various professions: trade business, teacher, butcher, accountant, etc. Lack of financial support made them hard to keep good players and even to afford the increasing traveling expenses. Some players chose to transfer to teams such as Taipower for making livings. The remaining people were sometimes unable to attend the league games due to working overtime in the weekends. A shocking 0–19 defeat to Flying Camel on January 26, 1986, revealed their difficult position – in that game they had only 8 applicable players. In 1988, Thunderbird was relegated to the second division for the first time. Although they fought back to the first division two years later, they were relegated again in 1991 and had struggled between the first and the second divisions afterward.

In the 1990s, Thunderbird changed its focus to bringing up Taiwanese youth footballers. In 1997, Thunderbird was renamed to Thunderbird Soccer Club and founded the Kaohsiung Thunderbird Soccer Association on January 21, 2006.

== See also ==
- Sports in Taiwan
