= 1999 Chinese Taipei National Football League =

Statistics of Chinese Taipei National Football League in the 1999 season.

== Overview ==
Taipower won the championship.
