= Kun Shan University =

Private university in Yongkang, Tainan, Taiwan

- 崑山科技大學
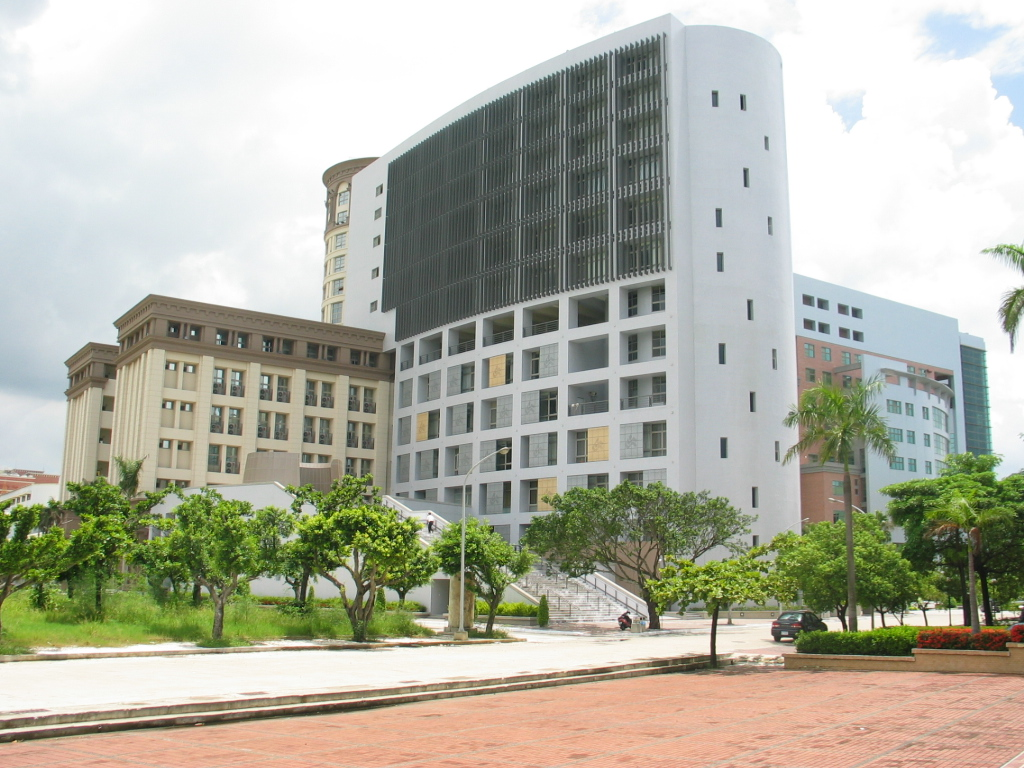
- Established: 29 April 1965 (as Kun Shan Institute of Technology); August 2000 (as KSU)
- Location: Yongkang, Tainan, Taiwan; 22°59′49″N 120°15′11″E
- Website: Official website

Kun Shan University
- Traditional Chinese: 崑山科技大學
Transcriptions
Standard Mandarin
- Hanyu Pinyin: Kūnshān Kējì Dàxué
Southern Min
- Hokkien POJ: Khun-san Kho-ki Tāi-ha̍k

Kun Shan University (KSU; Chinese: 崑山科技大學; Pe̍h-ōe-jī: Khun-san Kho-ki Tāi-ha̍k) is a private university in Yongkang District, Tainan, Taiwan. KSU is accredited by ACCSB.

KSU offers undergraduate and graduate programs in a variety of fields, including engineering, business, design, health sciences, and humanities.

The university is known for its strong engineering programs and has partnerships with companies such as Taiwan Semiconductor Manufacturing Company (TSMC) and ASE Technology Holding.

== History ==
KSU was founded as Kun Shan Institute of Technology on 29 April 1965. In August 2000, the school was promoted to Kun Shan University.

== Faculties ==
- College of Applied Human Ecology
- College of Business and Management
- College of Creative Media
- College of Engineering
- College of International Study

== Transportation ==
The university is accessible East from Tainan Station of Taiwan Railway.

== See also ==
- List of universities in Taiwan
