= 2004 Chinese Taipei National Football League =

Statistics of Chinese Taipei National Football League in the 2004 season.

== Overview ==
Taipower won the championship.
