= 1998 Chinese Taipei National Football League =

Football league season

Statistics of Chinese Taipei National Football League in the 1998 season.

== Overview ==
Taipower won the championship.
