= Enterprise Football League =

Semi-professional football league in Taiwan

- Current season, competition or edition: Enterprise Football League 2008
- Sport: Football
- Founded: 1982
- Ceased: 2009
- No. of teams: 4
- Country: Taiwan

The Enterprise Football League (Chinese: 企業足球聯賽), formerly known as the National Football League (Chinese: 全國足球聯賽) or the National First Division Football League (Chinese: 全國甲組足球聯賽), was the highest-ranked football league in the Republic of China (Taiwan). It was governed by the Chinese Taipei Football Association (CTFA) and considered semi-professional. The competition was ended in 2009 following a change in regulations and a merger into the Intercity Football League.

== History ==
The National Football League was founded by the Chinese Taipei Football Association (CTFA) in 1982 after popular interest motivated by 1982 FIFA World Cup. The CTFA planned to include it as part of the annual football season along with the other three cup competitions: Chung Cheng Cup (中正盃), Li Hui-tang Cup (李惠棠盃), and CTFA Cup (足協盃). The first league season featured 7 teams: Flying Camel, Taipei City Bank, Taiwan Power Company, Thunderbird, Lukuang, Taiwan Provincial College of Physical Education, and Taipei Physical Education College.

After 2006, the CTFA changed the name of the league to the Enterprise Football League in an attempt to attract more attention and financial support from successful Taiwanese enterprises. Fubon Financial became the major sponsor, and therefore the league was also known as the Fubon Enterprise Football League (Chinese: 富邦企業足球聯賽). The number of teams participating in the league was also reduced from eight to four by excluding college and high school teams in an attempt to make the league more professional. Nevertheless, there are currently only two semi-professional clubs remaining: Tatung F.C. and Taiwan Power Company F.C.

In November 2007, the CTFA announced that they would not hold further Enterprise Football League seasons after 2009. The Intercity Football League replaced the Enterprise Football League to become the top-ranked league in Taiwan.

== Teams ==
Team	Location	Number of appearances	Record streak	First appearance	Most recent appearance	Best result (season)
Chinese Taipei U-23 * 2008 name: Fubon Financial	Tsoying, Kaohsiung	3	3	2006	2008	3rd (2006, 2007)
I-Shou University * 2008 name: E-United Group	Kaohsiung County	1	1	2008	2008	-
Ming Chuan University * 2008 name: Bros Sports	Taipei City	5	4	2001-02	2008	3rd (2001–02, 2004)
National Sports Training Center *	Tsoying District, Kaohsiung	25	25	1983	2008	2nd (1984, 1991, 2007)
National Taiwan College of Physical Education * 2008 name: Molten Tso I	Taichung City	23	22	1983	2008	3rd (1997, 2002–03)
Taipei Physical Education College * 2008 name: Hun Sing	Songshan District, Taipei	23	22	1983	2008	6th (2005)
Taiwan Power Company F.C.	Fongshan City, Kaohsiung County	25	25	1983	2008	1st (1987, 1990, 1992, 1994, 1995, 1996, 1997, 1998, 1999, 2000–01, 2001–02, 2002–03, 2004, 2007)
Tatung F.C.	Taipei City	21	21	1986	2008	1st (2005, 2006)

* Not a club team.

== Results ==
Season	Champion	Runner-up	Third place	Fourth place
2008; Details	Taipower	Tatung	Taiwan PE College (as Molten Tso I)	Taipei PE College (as Hun Sing)
2007; Details	Taipower	NSTC (as Kenting Chateau)	Chinese Taipei U-23 (as Fubon Financial)	Tatung
2006; Details	Tatung	Taipower	Chinese Taipei U-23 (as China Steel)	NSTC (as Fubon Financial)
2005; Details	Tatung	Taipower	NSTC	Ming Chuan University
2004; Details	Taipower	Tatung	Ming Chuan University	Taiwan PE college
2002/03; Details	Taipower	Tatung	Taiwan PE college	Ming Chuan University
2001/02; Details	Taipower	Tatung	Ming Chuan University	Taiwan PE college
2000/01; Details	Taipower	Tatung	Wei Dan	Taiwan PE College
1999; Details	Taipower	Tatung	Lukuang	Taiwan PE college
1998; Details	Taipower	Taipei City Bank	Flying Camel	Taiwan PE College
1997; Details	Taipower	Tatung	Taiwan PE College	Taipei City Bank
1996; Details	Taipower	Tatung	Taipei City Bank	Flying Camel
1995; Details	Taipower	Tatung	Taipei City Bank	Lukuang
1994; Details	Taipower	Taipei City Bank	Lukuang	Flying Camel
1993; Details	Flying Camel	Taipower	Taipei City Bank	Tatung
1992; Details	Taipower	Tatung	Flying Camel	Lukuang
1991; Details	Taipei City Bank	Lukuang	Taipower	Tatung
1990; Details	Taipower	Taipei City Bank	Lukuang	Tatung
1989; Details	Taipei City Bank	Flying Camel	Lukuang	Taipower
1988; Details	Flying Camel	Taipower	Lukuang	Taipei City Bank
1987; Details	Taipower	Flying Camel	Taipei City Bank	Lukuang
1986; Details	Taipei City Bank	Flying Camel	Lukuang	Taipower
1985; Details	Flying Camel	Taipei City Bank	Lukuang	Taipower
1984; Details	Flying Camel	Lukuang	Taipei City Bank	Taipower
1983; Details	Flying Camel	Taipei City Bank	Taipower	Lukuang

== Performance by team ==
Team	Winners	Runners-up	Winning years
Taipower	15	4	1987, 1990, 1992, 1994, 1995, 1996, 1997, 1998, 1999, 2000–01, 2001–02, 2002–03, 2004, 2007, 2008
Flying Camel	5	3	1983, 1984, 1985, 1988, 1993
Taipei City Bank	3	5	1986, 1989, 1991
Tatung	2	9	2005, 2006
NSTC (Lukuang)	0	3	

== Promotions and relegations ==
Year	Promotions	Relegations
1983	Jinwen	None
1986	Tatung	Jinwen
1987	Kun Shan	Taiwan PE College
1988	Jing-feng, Taiwan PE College	Taipei PE College, Thunderbird
1989	Taipei PE College, Jinwen	Jing-feng, Kun Shan
1990	Jing-feng, Thunderbird	Taipei PE College, Jinwen
1991	Maritime College	Thunderbird, Taiwan PE College
1993	Thunderbird, Jun Li Construction	None
1994	Taiwan PE College, Hai San	Jing-feng, Thunderbird
1995	Thunderbird, Ming Chuan	Taiwan PE College, Hai San

== See also ==
- Chinese Taipei Football Association
- Sport in Taiwan
