= 2012 Intercity Football League =

2012 season of Intercity Football League

Intercity Football League
- Season: 2012
- Champions: Taipower FC
- AFC President's Cup: Taipower FC
- Matches: 42
- Goals: 165 (3.93 per match)
- Biggest home win: Taipower FC 8-0 I-Shou University FC
- Biggest away win: Ming Chuan University FC 0-6 Taipower FC; I-Shou University FC 1-7 Ming Chuan University FC
- Highest scoring: Ming Chuan University FC 2-7 Tatung FC

The 2012 Intercity Football League was the sixth season of the Intercity Football League since its establishment in 2007. Taipower FC were the defending champions, having won the league for the 3rd time last season.

The league was decided on the last day of the season. Despite losing 1–0 to Tatung FC, Taipower FC clinched their 4th league title due to their superior goal difference, and in doing so qualified for the 2013 AFC President's Cup.

== Standings ==
Pos	Team	Pld	W	D	L	GF	GA	GD	Pts	Qualification or relegation
1	Taipower FC	12	8	3	1	32	5	+27	27	Qualification for 2013 AFC President's Cup
2	Tatung FC	12	9	0	3	30	14	+16	27	
3	NSTC FC	12	7	1	4	23	22	+1	22	
4	NTCPE FC	12	5	2	5	28	23	+5	17	
5	Ming Chuan University FC	12	5	1	6	30	31	−1	16	
6	Tainan City	12	1	3	8	13	23	−10	6	
7	I-Shou University FC	12	1	2	9	9	47	−38	5	

Updated to match(es) played on 17 November 2012. Source: Soccerway
Rules for classification: 1) points; 2) goal difference; 3) number of goals scored.
