= I-Shou University F.C. =

Taiwanese football club

I-Shou University Football Club is an association football club from Taiwan. They play at the highest level and their home venue is the 5,000 capacityTaichung Football Field. It is a university football team.
