= Chiayi County F.C. =

Taiwanese football club

Chiayi County FC
- Full name: Chiayi County Football Club
- Ground: Chiayi City Sports Park
- Capacity: 1,000
- League: Intercity Football League

Chiayi County Football Club is a football club from Chinese Taipei, also called Taiwan or Republic of China. It is one of the main association football clubs in Chinese Taipei.
