= Intercity Football League =

Taiwanese football league

- Sport: Association football
- Founded: 2007
- Folded: 2016
- No. of teams: 8
- Country: Chinese Taipei (Taiwan)
- Last champion: Taipower (2015-16)
- Most titles: Taipower (6)
- Broadcasters: astro, IDN.Vision, TPE Channel
- Relegation to: CTFA football division
- Website: CTFA

Intercity Football League (Chinese: 城市足球聯賽; pinyin: Chéngshì zúqiú liánsài) was the top-ranked division in the Taiwanese football (soccer) league run by Chinese Taipei Football Association (CTFA), run from 2007 until 2016. From 2017, it was replaced by the Taiwan Football Premier League.

== History ==
The Intercity Football League was founded in 2007 after the transformation of then highest-ranked National First Division Football League (later Enterprise Football League). Different from the later, registered players were initially grouped by their places of residence, such as Tainan City, rather than specialized football teams, such as Taiwan Power Company (Taipower). The only exception was Tatung FC, who represented Taipei City to compete in the league. By Intercity Football League's establishment, CTFA hoped to root football into each area in Taiwan and also seed supports from local governments, councilors, and enterprises. In the first league season, several magistrates served as team leaders, including Chou Hsi-wei (Taipei County), Chen Ming-wen (Chiayi County), and Lu Kuo-hua (Yilan County).

Nevertheless, in 2008, CTFA opened the league participation to non-administrative division teams. Taipower and several college teams, such as National Taiwan College of Physical Education (as Taichung County Chia Cheng Hsin) and Taipei Physical Education College (as Tainan County Hun Shin), joined the competition.

CTFA announced new league regulations again in 2009. Each participating team should have name relating to one administrative region and more than 2/3 players having their households registered to that place for more than one month. Promotion and relegation were also introduced. However, the new regulations did not continue to the next league season. The 2010 league season adopted similar regulations as the 2008 season.

In August 2010, MediaTek were announced as the title sponsor of the Intercity Football League until 2013.

== Champions ==
The list of champions:

Season	Champion	Runner-up	Third place	Fourth place
2007	Taipei City Tatung	Taipei PE College (as Tainan County)	Yilan County	Chiayi County
2008	Kaohsiung County Taipower	Taiwan PE College (as Chia Cheng Hsin)	Taipei PE College (as Tainan County Hun Sing)	Taipei City Tatung
2009	Taiwan PE College (as Kaohsiung City Yoedy)	Kaohsiung County Taipower	Taipei Physical Education College (as Tainan County)	Taipei City Tatung
2010	Kaohsiung County Taipower	Taipei Physical Education College (as Asics)	Taipei City Tatung	National Sports Training Center
2011	Kaohsiung County Taipower	Taipei City Tatung	Taiwan PE College	Taipei PE College
2012	Kaohsiung County Taipower	Taipei City Tatung	National Sports Training Center	Taiwan PE College
2013	Taipei City Tatung	Kaohsiung County Taipower	Taichung City Dragon	Ming Chuan University
2014	Kaohsiung County Taipower	National Sports Training Center	Taichung City Dragon	Taipei City Tatung
2015–16	Kaohsiung County Taipower	Taipei City Tatung	Taiwan PE College	National Sports Training Center

== See also ==
- Enterprise Football League
- Chinese Taipei Football Association
