= 2011 Intercity Football League =

Intercity Football League
- Season: 2011

The 2011 Intercity Football League is the fifth season of the Intercity Football League since its establishment in 2007.

== Standings ==
Teams played each other twice.

Pos	Team	Pld	W	D	L	GF	GA	GD	Pts	Qualification
1	Taipower FC (C)	12	9	3	0	47	11	+36	30	Qualification to 2012 AFC President's Cup
2	Tatung FC	12	9	3	0	39	10	+29	30	
3	NTCPE FC	12	6	2	4	40	27	+13	20	
4	Taipei PEC FC	12	5	0	7	22	30	−8	15	
5	Ming Chuan University FC	12	4	2	6	29	31	−2	14	
6	NSTC FC	12	3	1	8	27	28	−1	10	
7	Hualien County FC	12	0	1	11	5	72	−67	1	

(C) Champions
