= Taipei City Bank F.C. =

Taiwanese football club

Taipei City Bank Football Club (Chinese: 台北銀行足球隊; pinyin: Táiběi Yínháng Zúqiú Duì) was a Taiwanese football club playing in Chinese Taipei National Football League.

It was dissolved by Ding Yukang after he became general manager of Taipei City Bank in 1999.

== Achievements ==
- National First Division Football League (now Enterprise Football League)
  - Winners (3): 1986, 1989, 1991
  - Runners-up (5): 1983, 1985, 1990, 1994, 1998
