= Flying Camel =

Taiwanese football club

Flying Camel Football Team (Chinese: 飛駝足球隊; pinyin: Fēi Tuó Zúqiú Duì) was a Taiwanese football team. The team was established on July 21, 1973, and belonged to the Combined Logistics Command of the Republic of China. They had played in Taiwan's first-ranked National Football League since 1982 and won 5 championships (1983, 1984, 1985, 1988, and 1993) before disbandment.

== Honours ==
National Football League

- Champions (5): 1983, 1984, 1985, 1988, 1993
- Runners-up (3): 1986, 1987, 1989

CTFA Cup

- Champions (5): 1974, 1979, 1980, 1981, 1982

== See also ==
- Football in Taiwan
