= List of football clubs in Taiwan =

This is the list of football clubs (teams) in Taiwan.

== Men ==
=== Taiwan Football Premier League (2024) ===
- Futuro
- Leopard Cat
- Ming Chuan University
- New Taipei Hang Yuan
- Sunny Bank AC Taipei
- Tainan City TSG
- Taipei Vikings
- Taiwan Power Company

=== Taiwan Second Division Football League (2024) ===
- AC Taipei Reserves
- Inter Taoyuan
- MCU Desafio
- NUK Kuo Kuang
- Taichung Rock
- Taipei Elite SC

=== Extinct Clubs ===
- CPC Corporation
- Flying Camel
- National Sports Training Center
- Royal Blues
- Taipei City Bank

== College teams ==
=== First division (2023–24) ===
- Chinese Culture University football team
- Fu Jen Catholic University football team
- I-Shou University football team
- Ming Chuan University football team
- National Cheng Kung University football team
- National Taiwan University of Sport football team
- Shih Hsin University football team
- University of Taipei football team

=== First challenger division (2023–24) ===
- Fu Jen Catholic University football team B
- Nanhua University football team
- National Tsing Hua University football team
- National Chung Hsing University football team
- National Pingtung University football team
- National Taiwan University football team
- NYCU Chiao Tung football team
- Shu-Te University football team

=== Second division (2023–24) ===
- Chinese Culture University football team B
- Chung Yuan Christian University football team
- Feng Chia University football team
- Fooyin University football team
- Kaohsiung Medical University football team
- National Pingtung University of Science and Technology football team
- National Taipei University of Technology football team
- National Taiwan Ocean University football team
- National Taiwan Sport University football team
- National Taiwan University of Science and Technology football team
- National University of Kaohsiung football team
- Republic of China Military Academy football team
- Taipei University of Marine Technology football team
- Tamkang University football team
- Tunghai University football team
- WuFeng University football team

=== Third division (2023–24) ===
- Chang Gung University football team
- China Medical University football team
- Chinese Culture University football team C
- Chung Hua University football team
- Chung Shan Medical University football team
- Fu Jen Catholic University football team C
- Kun Shan University football team
- Lee-Ming Institute of Technology football team
- National Central University football team
- National Cheng Kung University football team B
- National Chengchi University football team
- National Chi Nan University football team
- National Chiayi University football team
- National Chung Cheng University football team
- National Dong Hwa University football team
- National Kaohsiung Normal University football team
- National Kaohsiung University of Science and Technology football team
- National Sun Yat-sen University football team
- National Taipei University football team
- National Taitung University football team
- National Taiwan Normal University football team
- National Taiwan Ocean University football team B
- National United University football team
- National Yunlin University of Science and Technology football team
- NYCU Yang Ming football team
- Republic of China Air Force Academy football team
- Soochow University football team
- Southern Taiwan University of Science and Technology football team
- Taipei Medical University football team
- Vanung University football team
- Yuan Ze University football team

== Senior high school teams ==
The following teams have participated in 2023–24 Highschool Football League.

- (Kaohsiung) Chung Shan Industrial and Commercial School football team
- (Taoyuan, Taiwan) Dayuan International Senior High School football team
- Hsinchu Chien Kung Senior High School football team
- (New Taipei City) Kang Chiao International School football team
- (Kaohsiung) Kao Yuan Vocational School football team
- Kaohsiung Municipal Lu Chu Senior High School football team
- (Pingtung County) Laiyi Senior High School football team
- (Taichung) Ling Tung High School football team
- (Tainan) Liu Hsin Senior High School football team
- (Tainan) Nan Ying Vocational High School football team
- (Hualien County) National Hualien Senior High School football team
- (Hualien County) National Hualien Vocational High School of Agriculture football team
- (Yilan County, Taiwan) National Lotung Industrial Vocational High School football team
- (Chiayi County) National Minsyong Vocational High School of Augriculture & Technology football team
- (New Taipei City) National Overseas Chinese Senior High School football team
- (Tainan) National Pei Men Senior High School football team
- National Tainan First Senior High School football team
- (Yilan County, Taiwan) National Yilan Senior High School football team
- (New Taipei City) New Taipei Municipal Ching Shui High School football team
- (New Taipei City) New Taipei Municipal New Taipei Senior High School football team
- (New Taipei City) New Taipei Municipal Zhuwei High School football team
- (Hualien County) Stella Maris Ursuline High School football team
- (Hualien County) Szu Wei Senior High School football team
- Taichung Municipal Hui Wen High School football team
- Taipei Municipal Dali High School football team
- Taipei Municipal Fuxing Senior High School football team
- Taipei Municipal Heping High School football team
- Taipei Municipal Zhong-zheng Senior High School football team
- (Taipei) Tatung High School football team
- (Hsinchu County) Yeang-Der Senior High School football team
- (Taichung) Youth Senior High School football team

== Amateur ==
=== Northern Taiwan ===
- Keelung Milvus Football Club (基隆黑鳶足球俱樂部), based in Keelung
- Taipei Red Lions F.C. (台北红獅足球隊) based in Taipei
- Taipei Football Club. based in Taipei
- Taipei City F.C. (台北市足球隊), based in Taipei
- Dong Hu Football Club (東湖足球會), based in Neihu, Taipei
- Bibimbap Taipei Football Community (拌飯台北足球俱樂部), based in Taipei
- Eagle Club (老鷹足球會), based in Taipei
- Futbol Club de Movimiento Agresivo (MAFC) (好動足球俱樂部), based in Taipei
- Nei-Hu Fire Football Club (內湖火焰隊), based in Neihu, Taipei
- No Limit Soccer Team (無限足球隊), based in Taipei
- Shih-Chi Soccer Club (汐止足球俱樂部), based in Xizhi District, New Taipei
- Southeast Wind F.C. (東南風足球俱樂部), based in Tucheng District, New Taipei
- Taiwan Celts G.A.A. Club, based in Taipei
- Shongshan F.C., based in Taipei
- Da'an F.C. based in Taipei
- Mighty Shane F.C., based in Taipei
- Rogue F.C., now becomes Royal Blues F.C., based in Taipei
- Celts F.C., based in Taipei
- Riverside Magpies F.C., based in Taipei
- Master Football Academy / 明星足球; football for children to adults, based in Taipei
- Ontap Badgers, based in Taipei
- Saturday Football International (SFI) - 週六足球俱樂部; Football Club & Academy Program, based in Taipei
- Inter Taipei F.C., Football Club & Academy Program, based in Taipei
- Triangle Football Club, based in Taipei

http://www.soccerkid.url.tw Dream football club 夢幻國際足球隊 新竹

=== Central Taiwan ===
- Tiger Green Soccer Team (虎青足球隊), based in Yunlin
- Hikari FC, based in Taichung
- Taichung City Football Club, (TCFC) based in Taichung
- Taichung Compass Football Club, based in Taichung
- Jhubei Football Club, based in Hsinchu
- Tubbies football club, based in Taichung

=== Southern Taiwan ===
- Kaohsiung 100 Pacers FC, based in Kaohsiung
- Kaohsiung Massive Football Club, based in Kaohsiung
- Tainan Phoenix(台南鳳凰足球會), based in Tainan
- Thunderbird F.C., based in Kaohsiung
- Share Fun Bilingual Academy, Tainan City, Share Fun Royal King Soccer Club
- Share Fun Kindergarten, Tainan City, Share Fun Kingdom Football Team
