= 2008 in Taiwanese football =

2008 in Taiwanese (Chinese Taipei) football.

== Overview ==
- Chen Sing-an replaced Toshiaki Imai to become Chinese Taipei national football team's main coach.
- Enterprise Football League started on January 5, 2008, and ended on April 27, 2008. Taiwan Power Company F.C. won the league championship and will represent Chinese Taipei in AFC President's Cup 2009.
- National Women's First Division League was held from January 5 to March 2, 2008. Defending champion National Taiwan Normal University women's football team won the league championship.
- Highschool Football League was held from March 29 to April 20, 2008. National Pei Men Senior High School football team won their third championships.
- AFC Challenge Cup 2008 qualification (Group A) was held in Chungshan Soccer Stadium from April 2 to April 6, 2008. Chinese Taipei did not enter the final round.
- AFC President's Cup 2008 group stage (Group B) was held in Chungshan Soccer Stadium from April 12 to April 16, 2008. Taiwan Power Company F.C. represented Chinese Taipei to participate in the competition but did not enter the final round.
- Intercity Football League will start from August 23, 2008. The qualification tournaments took place from July 19 to August 2. 4 of 5 teams (Hualien, Taipower, Bros, Taipei F.C., and Chia Cheng Hsin) can enter the final tournament.
- National Youth Cup was held in Taipei County from October 20 to October 26, 2008.

== Events ==
- March 30, 2008 - Chinese Taipei women's national football team entered the final round of the 2008 AFC Women's Asian Cup.
- May 4, 2008 - National Hsin Feng Senior High School decided to stop enrolling football-specialized students from next semester.
- November 8, 2008 - Chinese Taipei women's national under-19 football team was qualified to enter the AFC U-19 Women's Championship.
- November 14, 2008 - Chinese Taipei women's national under-16 football team qualified for the finals of the AFC U-16 Women's Championship 2009.
- November 21, 2008 - Chinese Taipei Football Association moved its office because of the closure of Chungshan Soccer Stadium.

== League competitions ==
=== Intercity Football League ===
The 2008 season of Intercity Football League will start from August 23, 2008.

Taipei City (Tatung F.C.), Tainan County, Yilan County, and Taipei County qualified for being the top 4 places in the 2007 season. Taiwan Power Company F.C., Bros, Chia Cheng Hsin, and Hualien County qualified through the qualification tournament held between July 19 and August 2.

=== National Women's First Division League ===
Pos	Team	Pld	W	D	L	GF	GA	GD	Pts
1	National Taiwan Normal University	10	8	1	1	20	2	+18	25
2	National Taiwan College of Physical Education	10	7	3	0	21	7	+14	24
3	High School United	10	3	2	5	9	18	−9	11
4	San Chung Vocational High School	10	3	1	6	5	13	−8	10
5	Ming Chuan University	10	3	0	7	7	17	−10	9
6	Hsing Wu College	10	2	1	7	9	14	−5	7

- MVP: Wang Hsiang-huei (NTNU)
- Golden Boot: Lin Yu-hui (Taiwan PE College), Hsieh I-ling (NTNU)
- Best Manager: Chen Wen-fa (NTNU)
- Fair Play: National Taiwan Normal University

Source: Chinese Taipei Football Association

== Youth competitions ==
=== Highschool Football League ===
The 2008 season of Highschool Football League was held from March 29 and April 20, 2008. Chinese Taipei School Sport Federation replaced Chinese Taipei Football Association to become the main sponsor. Totally 17 teams participated in the competition. They were divided into two divisions, north and south, in the preliminary round. The best four teams of each division entered to the final round. Since 2008, the league regulations have forbidden players who have registered or played in the Enterprise Football League or other professional football leagues to participate in HFL.

==== Under-19 men ====
Team	Location	Result
National Pei Men Senior High School	Tainan County	Champion
Kaohsiung County Lu Chu Senior High School	Kaohsiung County	Runner-up
Taipei High School	Taipei City	3rd place
National Hualien Vocational High School of Agriculture	Hualien County	4th place
National Yilan Senior High School	Yilan County	5th place
National Hsin Feng Senior High School	Tainan County	6th place
National Hualien Senior High School	Hualien County	7th place
Taichung Municipal Hui Wen High School	Taichung City	8th place
Neng Ren Vocational High School	Taipei County	Eliminated in preliminary round
Taipei Municipal Daan Vocational High School	Taipei City	Eliminated in preliminary round
Taipei County Ching Shui Senior High School	Taipei County	Eliminated in preliminary round
National San Chung Senior High School	Taipei County	Eliminated in preliminary round
Kaohsiung Municipal Ruei Siang Senior High School	Kaohsiung City	Eliminated in preliminary round
Chung San Industrial and Commercial School	Kaohsiung County	Eliminated in preliminary round
Ming Dao High School	Taichung County	Eliminated in preliminary round
Chung Cheng Industrial Vocational High School	Kaohsiung City	Eliminated in preliminary round
National Shiou Shuei Industrial Vocational High School	Changhua County	Eliminated in preliminary round

==== Under-16 men ====
Team	Location	Result
Hualien County Mei Lun Junior High School	Hualien County	Champion
Taichung Municipal Li Ming Junior High School	Taichung City	Runner-up
Tainan County Jia Li Junior High School	Tainan County	3rd place
Kaohsiung County A Lien Junior High School	Kaohsiung County	4th place

==== Under-19 women ====
Team	Location	Result
Hualien Physical Experimental Senior High School	Hualien County	Champion
Kaohsiung Municipal Jui Hsiang High School	Kaohsiung City	Runner-up
Hsing Wu Senior High School	Taipei County	3rd place

== National teams ==
=== Chinese Taipei national football team ===
Date	Venue	Opponents	Score	Competition	Chinese Taipei scorer(s)	Report
April 2, 2008	Chungshan Soccer Stadium, Taipei	Pakistan	1–2	ACCQ(A)	Lo Chih-an	AFC
April 4, 2008	Chungshan Soccer Stadium, Taipei	Guam	4–1	ACCQ(A)	Chang Han, Huang Wei-yi, Chen Po-liang, Chiang Shih-lu	AFC
April 6, 2008	Chungshan Soccer Stadium, Taipei	Sri Lanka	2–2	ACCQ(A)	Chang Han, Tsai Hsien-tang	AFC
May 24, 2008	Fatorda Stadium, Margao	India	0–3	F		AIFF
May 27, 2008	Nehru Stadium, Chennai	India	2–2	F	Chen Po-liang, Hsieh Meng-hsuan	The Hindu

Key

- ACCQ(A) = AFC Challenge Cup qualifying (Group A)
- F = Friendly

=== Chinese Taipei national under-17 football team ===
Date	Venue	Opponents	Score	Competition	Chinese Taipei scorer(s)	Report
March 10, 2008	Jalan Besar Stadium, Singapore	Australia	0–8	LCC		CTFA
March 12, 2008	Jalan Besar Stadium, Singapore	Singapore B	1–5	LCC		CTFA
March 13, 2008	Jalan Besar Stadium, Singapore	United Arab Emirates	1–2	LCC		CTFA
March 16, 2008	Singapore Sports School, Singapore	Singapore A	0–1	F		CTFA

Key

- LCC = Lion City Cup
- F = Friendly

=== Chinese Taipei women's national football team ===
Date	Venue	Opponents	Score	Competition	Chinese Taipei scorer(s)	Report
March 24, 2008	Thanh Long Stadium, Ho Chi Minh City	Myanmar	3–0	AWCQ(A)	Wang Hsiang-huei, Lin Yu-hui (2 goals)	AFC
March 26, 2008	Thanh Long Stadium, Ho Chi Minh City	Vietnam	1–3	AWCQ(A)	Kuo Tzu-hui	AFC
March 28, 2008	Thong Nhat Stadium, Ho Chi Minh City	Iran	2–3	AWCQ(A)	Lai Li-chin, Kuo Tzu-hui	AFC
May 29, 2008	Thong Nhat Stadium, Ho Chi Minh City	Australia	0–4	AWC		AFC
May 31, 2008	Thong Nhat Stadium, Ho Chi Minh City	Japan	0–11	AWC		AFC
June 2, 2008	Army Stadium, Ho Chi Minh City	South Korea	0–2	AWC		AFC

Key

- AWCQ(A) = AFC Women's Asian Cup qualifying (Group A)
- AWC = AFC Women's Asian Cup

=== Chinese Taipei women's national under-19 football team ===
Date	Venue	Opponents	Score	Competition	Chinese Taipei scorer(s)	Report
October 29, 2008	KLFA Stadium, Kuala Lumpur	Australia	0–3	AUWCQ		AFC
October 31, 2008	KLFA Stadium, Kuala Lumpur	Iran	2–1	AUWCQ	Wu Shih-ping, Lin Kai-ling	AFC
November 5, 2008	KLFA Stadium, Kuala Lumpur	Thailand	1–2	AUWCQ	Yu Hsiu-chin	AFC
November 8, 2008	KLFA Stadium, Kuala Lumpur	India	7–0	AUWCQ	Lin Ya-han (2 goals), Chen Yen-ping (2 goals), Lin Kai-ling, Yang Ya-han (2 goals)	AFC

Key

- AUWCQ = AFC U-19 Women's Championship qualification

=== Chinese Taipei women's national under-16 football team ===
Date	Venue	Opponents	Score	Competition	Chinese Taipei scorer(s)	Report
November 9, 2008	KLFA Stadium, Kuala Lumpur	China	1–6	AUWCQ	Yang Ching	AFC
November 11, 2008	Kuala Lumpur Stadium, Kuala Lumpur	Uzbekistan	1–0	AUWCQ	Yang Shu-ting	AFC
November 13, 2008	KLFA Stadium, Kuala Lumpur	India	2–1	AUWCQ	Sung Hui-ling, Yang Ching	AFC

Key

- AUWCQ = AFC U-16 Women's Championship qualification

=== Chinese Taipei national futsal team ===
Date	Venue	Opponents	Score	Competition	Chinese Taipei scorer(s)	Report
March 26, 2008	Matsushita Sports Complex, Shah Alam	Maldives	4–2	AFCQ(A)	Fang Ching-jen (3 goals), Lin Po-yuan	AFC
March 27, 2008	Matsushita Sports Complex, Shah Alam	Vietnam	8–4	AFCQ(A)	Huang Chiu-ching, Fang Ching-jen, Kuo Yin-hung, Wang Yung-lun (2 goals), Chen Bing-shin (2 goals), Lo Wen-hao	AFC
March 28, 2008	Matsushita Sports Complex, Shah Alam	Malaysia	4–7	AFCQ(A)	Wang Chih-sheng, Wang Yung-lun (3 goals)	AFC
May 11, 2008	Nimibutr Stadium, Bangkok	Japan	2–8	AFC	Chang Fu-hsiang (2 goals)	AFC
May 12, 2008	Nimibutr Stadium, Bangkok	Australia	0–6	AFC		AFC
May 13, 2008	Hua Mark Indoor Stadium, Bangkok	Turkmenistan	2–6	AFC	Huang Chiu-ching, Chen Chun-chieh	AFC

Key

- AFCQ(A) = 2008 AFC Futsal Championship qualifying (Group A)
- AFC = 2008 AFC Futsal Championship
