= National Youth Cup (Taiwan) =

Football competition run

The National Youth Cup (Chinese: 全國青年盃) is a Taiwanese football competition run by the Chinese Taipei Football Association. Starting from 1996, it is one of three major youth football tournaments in Taiwan together with Highschool Football League and National High School Games. The competition is held in the end of the year, usually in September or October, and is divided into three groups: under-19 men, under-17 men, and under-19 women.

Since 2005, the top 4 teams of under-19 men group are granted to enter the next season of the Highschool Football League.

== Men (under-19 and under-17) ==
=== Results ===
Year	Under-19				Under-17			
Year	Champion	Runner-up	Third place	Fourth place	Champion	Runner-up	Third place	Fourth place
2008	Hualien Agriculture	Lu Chu	Yilan	Hsin Feng	Pei Men	Hualien		
2007	Pei Men	Lu Chu	Hualien Agriculture	Yilan	Pei Men	Hui Wen	Hsin Feng	San Chung
2006	Yilan	Pei Men	Taipei	Ching Shui	Hualien Agriculture	Lu Chu	Yilan	Laiyi
2005	Yilan	Pei Men	San Chung	Hualien	Hualien	Hui Wen	Jui Hsiang	Hsin Feng
2004	Chung Cheng	Hualien Agriculture	Hualien	Lu Chu	Hualien	San Chung	Ching Shui	Chung San
2003	Chung San	Hualien	Pei Men	Ching Shui				
2002	Chung San	Pei Men	Hualien Agriculture	Yilan				
2001	Chung San	Yilan	Taipei	Ching Shui				
2000	Kao Yuan	Ruei Siang	Chung San	Jingwen				
1999	Jingwen	Chung Cheng	Ruei Siang	Hualien Agriculture	Chung San	Kao Yuan	Chung Cheng	-
1998	Shu Lin	Hsin Feng	Jingwen	Chiayi Industrial				
1997	Shu Lin	Kao Yuan	Hsin Feng	Jingwen				
1996	Dah Yung	Jingwen	Shu Lin	Hsin Feng				

=== Performance by team ===
Team	Titles	Runners-up	Third place	Fourth place
Chung San	3 (2001, 2002, 2003)	-	1 (2000)	-
Yilan	2 (2005, 2006)	1 (2001)	-	2 (2002, 2007)
Shu Lin	2 (1997, 1998)	-	1 (1996)	-
Pei Men	1 (2007)	3 (2002, 2005, 2006)	1 (2003)	-
Jingwen	1 (1999)	1 (1996)	1 (1998)	2 (1997, 2000)
Chung Cheng	1 (2004)	1 (1999)	-	-
Kao Yuan	1 (2000)	1 (1997)	-	-
Dah Yung	1 (1996)	-	-	-
Hualien Agriculture	-	1 (2004)	2 (2002, 2007)	1 (1999)
Hualien	-	1 (2003)	1 (2004)	1 (2005)
Lu Chu	-	1 (2007)	-	1 (2004)

== Women (under-19) ==
=== Results ===
Year	Champion	Runner-up	Third place	Fourth place
2007	Hualien PE	Hsing Wu	Jui Hsiang	San Min
2006	San Chung VS	Hualien PE	Hsing Wu	San Min
2005	Hualien PE	San Chung VS	San Min	-
2004	Hualien PE	San Chung VS	-	-
2003	Hualien PE	Chung San	San Chung VS	-
2002	Chung San	Hualien PE	-	-
2001	Siao Gang	Jingwen	-	-
2000	Dahan	Siao Gang	Jingwen	-
1999	Jingwen	Chung San	San Min	-
1998	Jingwen	Chung San	Hsing Wu	San Min
1997	Hsing Wu	Gao Fong	Chung San	Jingwen
1996	Chung San	Hsing Wu	Gao Fong	-

=== Performance by team ===
Team	Location	Titles	Runners-up
Hualien PE	Hualien County	4 (2003, 2004, 2005, 2007)	2 (2002, 2006)
Chung San	Kaohsiung County	2 (1996, 2002)	3 (1998, 1999, 2003)
Jingwen	Taipei City	2 (1998, 1999)	1 (2001)
San Chung VS	Taipei County	1 (2006)	2 (2004, 2005)
Siao Gang	Kaohsiung City	1 (2001)	1 (2000)
Hsing Wu	Taipei County	1 (1997)	1 (1996)
Dahan	Hualien County	1 (2000)	-

== See also ==
- Chinese Taipei Football Association
- Highschool Football League
