= Chinese Taipei national under-17 football team =

National association football team

Chinese Taipei U-17
- Association: Chinese Taipei Football Association
- Confederation: AFC (Asia)
- FIFA code: TPE
First colours	Second colours

First international
- Chinese Taipei 3–0 New Caledonia (Auckland, New Zealand; 3 December 1983)

Biggest win
- Vanuatu 0–13 Chinese Taipei (Sydney, Australia; 23 January 1989)

Biggest defeat
- Chinese Taipei 0–12 South Korea (Bangkok, Thailand; 24 October 2007)

OFC U-17 Championship
- Appearances: 3 (first in 1983)
- Best result: 3rd place (3 times)

The Chinese Taipei national under-17 football team is the under-17 football team of Taiwan (Republic of China) and is controlled by the Chinese Taipei Football Association.

== Players ==
=== Current squad ===
The following 23 players were selected for the 2027 AFC U-17 Asian Cup qualification.

No.	Pos.	Player	Date of birth (age)	Club
1	GK	Chang Yu-en		(Chinese Taipei Football Association) Hualien Vocational School of Agriculture
18	GK	Yang Cheng-han		(Chinese Taipei Football Association) New Taipei High School
23	GK	Hsieh Ming-yang		(Chinese Taipei Football Association) Kaohsiung Attackers
2	DF	Wang Cheng		(Chinese Taipei Football Association) Hui Wen High School
3	DF	Lin Mu-yang		(Chinese Taipei Football Association) Hui Wen High School
5	DF	Lai Han-wei (captain)		(Chinese Taipei Football Association) Pei Men High School
13	DF	Hu Yu-chia		(Chinese Taipei Football Association) Hualien High School
19	DF	Tsai Ting-yu		(Chinese Taipei Football Association) AC Taipei
4	MF	Lai Min-en		(Chinese Taipei Football Association) Yilan High School
6	MF	Sung Chi-yu		(Chinese Taipei Football Association) Overseas Chinese High School
8	MF	Weng Shou-en		(Chinese Taipei Football Association) New Taipei High School
11	MF	Liu Ri-sheng		(Chinese Taipei Football Association) Chung Shan Industrial and Commercial School
12	MF	Wang Xiang		(Chinese Taipei Football Association) Hualien Vocational School of Agriculture
14	MF	Ma Hao-en		(Chinese Taipei Football Association) Pei Men High School
15	MF	Jhan Syun-gong		(Chinese Taipei Football Association) Hualien High School
16	MF	Liu Ko-yu		(Chinese Taipei Football Association) Chung Shan Industrial and Commercial School
17	MF	Chen Sheng-en		(Chinese Taipei Football Association) Pei Men High School
20	MF	Bowen Bartlett		(Chinese Taipei Football Association) Taichung Futuro
21	MF	Yuan Shih-chun		(Chinese Taipei Football Association) MFA Taiwan
7	FW	Lin Tzu-chi		(Chinese Taipei Football Association) Hui Wen High School
9	FW	Liu Jin-wei		(Chinese Taipei Football Association) Hualien Vocational School of Agriculture
10	FW	Zhang Yi-le		(Chinese Taipei Football Association) Overseas Chinese High School
22	FW	Jiang Cheng-hong		(Chinese Taipei Football Association) Kaohsiung Attackers

== Competitive record ==
=== FIFA U-17 World Cup ===
FIFA U-17 World Cup record
Year	Result	Position	Pld	W	D	L	GF	GA
(China) 1985	Did not qualify							
(Canada) 1987	Did not qualify							
(Scotland) 1989	Did not qualify							
(Italy) 1991	Did not participate							
(Japan) 1993	Withdrew							
(Ecuador) 1995	Did not qualify							
(Egypt) 1997	Did not qualify							
(New Zealand) 1999	Did not qualify							
(Trinidad and Tobago) 2001	Did not qualify							
(Finland) 2003	Did not qualify							
(Peru) 2005	Did not qualify							
(South Korea) 2007	Did not qualify							
(Nigeria) 2009	Did not qualify							
(Mexico) 2011	Did not qualify							
(United Arab Emirates) 2013	Did not qualify							
(Chile) 2015	Did not qualify							
(India) 2017	Did not qualify							
(Brazil) 2019	Did not qualify							
(Indonesia) 2023	Did not qualify							
(Qatar) 2025	Did not qualify							
Total	0/19	0 Titles	0	0	0	0	0	0

=== AFC U-16 Championship ===
AFC U-16 Championship record
Year	Result	Position	Pld	W	D	L	GF	GA
(Saudi Arabia) 1992	Withdrew							
(Qatar) 1994	Did not participate							
(Thailand) 1996	Did not qualify							
(Qatar) 1998	Did not qualify							
(Vietnam) 2000	Did not qualify							
(United Arab Emirates) 2002	Did not qualify							
(Japan) 2004	Did not qualify							
(Singapore) 2006	Did not qualify							
(Uzbekistan) 2008	Did not qualify							
(Uzbekistan) 2010	Did not qualify							
(Iran) 2012	Did not qualify							
(Thailand) 2014	Did not qualify							
(India) 2016	Did not qualify							
(Malaysia) 2018	Did not qualify							
(Bahrain) 2020	Cancelled due to COVID-19 pandemic							
Total	0/14	0 Titles	0	0	0	0	0	0

=== AFC U-17 Championship ===
AFC U-17 Championship record
Year	Result	Position	Pld	W	D	L	GF	GA
(Thailand) 2023	Did not qualify							
(Saudi Arabia) 2025	Did not qualify							
(Saudi Arabia) 2026	Did not qualify							
Total	0/3	0 Titles	0	0	0	0	0	0

=== OFC U-17 Championship ===
OFC U-17 Championship record
Year	Result	Position	Pld	W	D	L	GF	GA
(New Zealand) 1983	Third place	3rd	5	2	1	2	11	4
(Taiwan) 1986	Third place	3rd	4	2	0	2	5	6
(Australia) 1989	Third place	3rd	4	2	0	2	23	5
Total	3/3	0 Titles	13	6	1	6	39	15
