= National High School Games =

Recurring sports event in Taiwan

National High School Games (Chinese: 全國中等學校運動會; pinyin: Quánguó Zhōngděng Xuéxiào Yùndònghuì) is the largest multi-sport event for junior and senior high school players in Taiwan.The Games started in 1952, under the name of Taiwan Provincial High School Games (Chinese: 臺灣省中學運動會; pinyin: Táiwānshěng Xuéxiào Yùndònghuì). It is now organized by the Sports Administration of the Ministry of Education. The host city changes every year. The name "National High School Games" has been used since 2000.

== Sports ==
The following sports are National High School Games official programs:

- Archery
- Association football
- Athletics (sport)
- Badminton
- Gymnastics
- Judo
- Karate
- Martial arts
- Powerlifting
- Soft tennis
- Swimming (sport)
- Table tennis
- Taekwondo
- Team handball
- Tennis
- Wrestling

== Results ==
=== Football (soccer) ===
The football (soccer) program at the National High School Games is probably the most important event for high school football teams in Taiwan. In each group, 8 teams are selected to compete in the final round after playing in the qualifying tournaments.

==== U-19 men ====
Year	Champion	Runner-up	3rd place	4th place	5th place	6th place	7th place	8th place
2007	Yilan (ILC)	Ching Shui (TPC)	Chung Shan (KHC)	Hualien Agriculture (HLC)	Pei Men (TNC)	Hsin Feng (TNC)	Lu Chu (KHC)	Taipei (TP)
2006	San Chung (TPC)	Yilan (ILC)	Pei Men (TNC)	Ching Shui (TPC)	Hualien Agriculture (HLC)	Lu Chu (KHC)	Hualien (HLC)	Hsin Feng (TNC)
2005	Yilan (ILC)	Hualien (HLC)	Lu Chu (KHC)	Hualien Agriculture (HLC)	San Chung (TPC)	Pei Men (TNC)	Hsin Feng (TNC)	Nan Oau (ILC)
2004	Hualien Agriculture (HLC)	Pei Men (TNC)	Ching Shui (TPC)	Hualien (HLC)	?	?	?	?
2003	Pei Men (TNC)	Yilan (ILC)	?	?	?	?	?	?
2002	Yilan (ILC)	?	?	?	?	?	?	?

==== U-16 men ====
Year	Champion	Runner-up	3rd place	4th place	5th place	6th place	7th place	8th place
2007	Jia Li (TNC)	Mei Lun (HLC)	A Lien (KHC)	San Jhih (TPC)	Guei Ren (TNC)	Shuen An (ILC)	Hai Shan (TPC)	Li Ming (TC)
2006	A Lien (KHC)	Mei Lun (HLC)	Wen Hsien (TNC)	Ching Shui (TPC)	Jia Li (TNC)	Shuen An (ILC)	Guei Ren (TNC)	San Jhih (TPC)
2005	Mei Lun (HLC)	A Lien (KHC)	Shi Pai (TP)	Jia Li (TNC)	Guei Ren (TNC)	Ching Shui (TPC)	Jui Hsiung (KH)	Ma Jia (PTC)

==== U-19 women ====
Year	Champion	Runner-up	3rd place	4th place	5th place	6th place	7th place	8th place
2007	There were not enough teams registered.							
2006	There were not enough teams registered.							

==== U-16 women ====
Year	Champion	Runner-up	3rd place	4th place	5th place	6th place	7th place	8th place
2007	Hsing Wu (TPC)	Kuang Fu (HLC)	Ming Chih (TPC)	Nan Oau (ILC)	Hsiao Kang (KHC)	Yu Chang (KHC)	–	–
2006	Kuang Fu (HLC)	Hsing Wu (TPC)	Hsiao Kang (KHC)	Linpien (PTC)	Ming Chih (TPC)	Chung Dao (ILC)	–	–

== Hosts ==
- 2007: Tainan County
- 2006: Hsinchu City
- 2005: Chiayi County
- 2004: Hualien County
- 2003: Tainan City
