= My Football Summer =

My Football Summer (奇蹟的夏天)
- Film poster
- Directed by: Yang Li-chou; Chang Rong-ji
- Produced by: Michelle Chu
- Distributed by: Serenity Entertainment
- Release date: 22 September 2006
- Running time: 103 minutes
- Country: Taiwan
- Languages: Mandarin (subtitled Chinese and English)

My Football Summer (Chinese: 奇蹟的夏天; pinyin: Qíjī de xiàtiān; Wade–Giles: Ch'i-chi te hsia-t'ien, literally "A Miraculous Summer") is a 2006 documentary film directed by Yang Li-chou and Chang Rong-ji about a group of young aboriginal football players in pursuit of a dream.

== Origin ==
In the beginning of 2006, Yang was commissioned by Nike Taiwan to make a 5-minute-long commercial for the upcoming 2006 FIFA World Cup, in Germany. During the filming, Yang chose to expand the project into a feature-length documentary because he believed the subject was too heartfelt to be satisfied by only four short movies. He requested Chang, his student and cinematographer, to serve as the co-director.

== Synopsis ==
In Hualien, players of Mei Lun Junior High School (Chinese: 美崙國中) football team are preparing for the upcoming National High School Games, which is one of the major youth football competitions in Taiwan. It is the last, and the most important, game in their three years of junior-high-school life. They are eager to win, not only because they are the defending champion, but also they want to devote the title to their beloved coach, Wu Hsiao-yin, as his wedding gift.

Things go well in the beginning. They beat every team they encounter and eventually reach the final, in which they meet their major contender, Alian Junior High School (阿蓮國中) of Kaohsiung County. They make 2–2 at the full-time whistle, and lose the game in the penalty shootout.

The life keeps going on. After graduation, some players enter National Hualien Senior High School, whereas the others enter Hualien Vocational High School of Agriculture. They meet each other again in a friendly match between the two school teams, but they are now competitors.

== Multimedia ==
Trailers:

- Trailer on YouTube

Nike commercials:

- Honor
- Team
- Heart
- Joy
- Behind the scenes

== Honors ==
- 2006 Golden Horse Award for Best Documentary

== Follow-up ==
- In November 2006, Hualien Vocational High School of Agriculture gained victory over Lu Chu Senior High School, which consisted of many players from A Lien Junior High School, in the final of men's under-17 group of 2006 National Youth Cup.
