= Highschool Football League =

Football league in the Republic of China

- Current season, competition or edition: Highschool Football League 2020
- Sport: Football (soccer)
- Founded: 2006
- No. of teams: 8
- Country: Taiwan
- Most recent champion: Pei Men

The Highschool Football League (HFL; Chinese: 高中足球聯賽; pinyin: Gāozhōng zúqiú liánsài), founded in 2006 by Chinese Taipei Football Association, is the second-level football (soccer) league in the Republic of China (Taiwan). The competitions are played between senior-high school teams (under-19 men). In 2008, HFL's main sponsor changed to Chinese Taipei School Sport Federation (Chinese: 中華民國高級中等學校體育總會).

== Format ==
The league features a total of eight teams that compete during the first half of the year (e.g. February to May for the 2006 season). The top four teams of the National Youth Cup and the top two teams of current league season are granted to become league members next year. The remaining places are determined by qualification competitions held in December.

== Teams ==
=== 2007 teams ===
Team	Location	Number of appearances	Record streak	First appearance	Most recent appearance	Best result (season)
Ching Shui	Tucheng, Taipei County	1	1	2007	2007	-
Chung San	Daliao, Kaohsiung County	2	2	2006	2007	7th (2006)
Hsin Feng	Gueiren, Tainan County	2	2	2006	2007	6th (2006)
Hui Wen	Taichung City	1	1	2007	2007	-
Yilan	Yilan City	2	2	2006	2007	3rd (2006)
Pei Men	Jiali, Tainan County	2	2	2006	2007	1st (2006)
San Chung	Sanchong, Taipei County	2	2	2006	2007	2nd (2006)
Taipei	Taipei City	2	2	2006	2007	8th (2006)

=== Other teams ===
Team	Location	Number of appearances	Record streak	First appearance	Most recent appearance	Best result (season)
Chung Cheng	Kaohsiung City	1	1	2006	2006	5th (2006)
Hualien	Hualien City	1	1	2006	2006	4th (2006)
Hualien Agriculture	Hualien City	0	N/A	N/A	N/A	N/A
Pingtung	Pingtung City	0	N/A	N/A	N/A	N/A

== Results ==
Season	Champion	Runner-up	Third place	Fourth place	Fair Play	Golden Boot	Best Player	Best Coach
2008; Details	Pei Men	Lu Chu	Taipei	Hualien Agriculture
2007; Details	Pei Men	Yilan	Ching Shui	Taipei	Pei Men	Lo Chih-en	Yang Chao-hsun	Hung Chin-chang
2006; Details	Pei Men	San Chung	Yilan	Hualien	Yilan	Wu Pai-ho; Chen Po-liang	Chan Che-yuan	Chen Jiunn-ming

== Wins by team ==
- 3 - Pei Men

== League records ==
- Most seasons: 3 – Pei Men, Taipei, and Yilan
- Most seasons won: 2 – Pei Men
- Most points: 27 – Pei Men (2007)
- Most goals for: 26 – Pei Men (2006)
- Most goals against: 38 – Chung Cheng (2006)
- Most consecutive wins: 6 – San Chung (2006)
- Most consecutive losses: 6 – Taipei (2006)
- Most consecutive wins and draws: 7 – San Chung (2006)
- Largest wins: Hualien 9-1 Chung Cheng (2006)
- Top scorer: Chen Po-liang – 11 goals for Chung Cheng (2006)
- Top scorer in one game: Lin Ching-tsan – 4 goals for Hualien against Taipei, April 3, 2006

== Sponsorship ==
- Adidas

== See also ==
- Chinese Taipei Football Association
- List of football competitions in Taiwan
