= Lu Kun-chi =

Taiwanese footballer (born 1985)

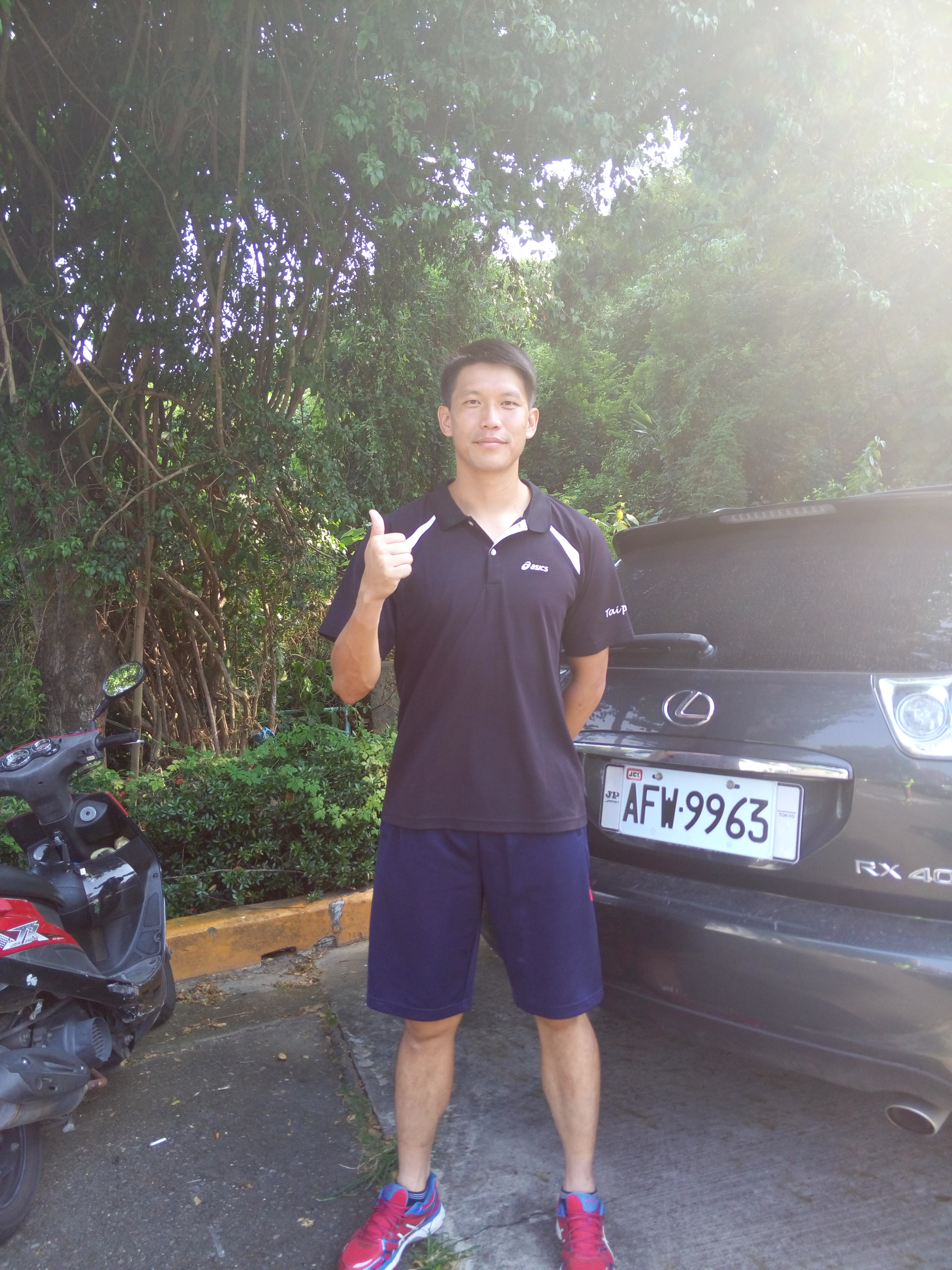

Personal information
- Date of birth: 6 February 1985 (age 41)
- Place of birth: Tainan, Taiwan
- Height: 1.85 m (6 ft 1 in)
- Position: Goalkeeper

Youth career
- 1992–1997: Jia Li Preparatory School
- 1997–2000: Jia Li Junior Elementary
- 2000–2003: Pei Men SHS

Senior career*
Years	Team	Apps	(Gls)
2003–2006	Taiwan PE College		
2007	Grulla Morioka	1	(0)
2008–2009	Taiwan PE College		
2009–2010	NSTC		
2010–	Taipower		

International career
2003–2007	Chinese Taipei U-23	2	(0)
2004–	Chinese Taipei	23	(0)
- * Club domestic league appearances and goals

Lu Kun-chi (Chinese: 呂昆錡; pinyin: Lǚ Kūnqí, born 6 February 1985 in Tainan County (now part of Tainan City), Republic of China) is a Taiwanese football goalkeeper. Nicknamed Taiwanese Buffon (台灣布馮), he is the first choice goalkeeper in the Chinese Taipei national football team.

== Biography ==
=== Early years ===
Lu was born in Tainan County, Taiwan. He has one brother and one sister, among whom he is the youngest. Lu started to play football at the age of 10 after his family moved to Jiali, another township in Tainan other than which he was born. He has played goalkeeper since age 11 in Jiali Primary School and Jiali Junior High School.

When he was 14, his height reached 180 cm (5 ft 11 in). It was thought he was likely to be included in the Chinese Taipei U-15 squad, but he was not. "At that time, I told myself I should enter the [Chinese Taipei] youth team in three years," he said to the press after years. Under the instruction of Pei Men goalkeeper coach Hung Chin-chang, he spent only two years to make his wish come true. He was called up to the Chinese Taipei U-21 at age 17, the U-23 at age 18, and eventually the senior team in 2004.

=== Chinese Taipei debut ===
Lu's Chinese Taipei senior team debut was on October 14, 2004 against Palestine in 2006 FIFA World Cup qualification. His amazing performance soon earned him a regular place in the national team. Since then, he has been the first choice goalkeeper for Chinese Taipei. He also performed well in domestic league. He has been voted as the Best Goalkeeper in the Chinese Taipei National Football League 2005 season at the time he plays for National Taiwan College of Physical Education.

=== Seeking opportunities in Japan ===
In June, 2005, Masakazu Suzuki, former manager of J. League side Júbilo Iwata, was invited to Taiwan to give lectures and to provide selection tests to Taiwanese talented youngsters. Lu took the test but did not perform himself because he was too nervous to keep his pace. One month later, supported by his professor Chao Jung-jui in Taiwan PE College, he went to Japan for the first time to accept the training tests provided by Yokohama FC and JEF United Ichihara Chiba. However, he failed to earn his position in both clubs.

In October, 2006, with the recommendation of then Chinese Taipei manager Toshiaki Imai, Lu flew to Japan again to join the trainings with Yokohama F. Marinos for 2 weeks along with his teammate Chen Po-liang.

=== Grulla Morioka ===
After two months of waiting, although there was no update from Yokohama, Lu received an invitation from Grulla Morioka of the Japanese regional Tohoku League. He became the first Taiwanese male footballer to join a Japanese professional football club. On March 4, 2007, a press conference was held, and Grulla Morioka formally announced their signings of Lu and his compatriot Chuang Wei-lun, albeit the latter suddenly returned to Taiwan and failed to contract with the club afterwards. Lu's contract was confirmed on March 9, and he was assigned the number 22 shirt. On June 10, Lu made his debut for Grulla in the game against Furukawa Battery F.C., of which he substituted Kazuya Obara after 83 minutes. However, he was unable to prove himself and sidelined from first-team action. With Grulla Morioka's failure in the year-end JFL promotion tournament, Lu returned to Taiwan in December.

=== Returning to Taiwan ===
After returning to Taiwan, Lu was back to the National Taiwan College of Physical Education football team (as Molten Tso I) during the Enterprise Football League 2008 season. Then Lu served military service in National Sports Training Center football team and joined Taiwan Power Company F.C. afterwards.

== Career statistics ==
Club	Season	League		Asia		Total	
Club	Season	Apps	Goals	Apps	Goals	Apps	Goals
Taiwan PE College	2005	?	0	-	-	?	0
Taiwan PE College	2006	?	0	-	-	?	0
(Japan) Grulla Morioka	2007	1	0	-	-	1	0
Taiwan PE College	2008	?	0	-	-	?	0
Career totals		?	0	0	0	?	0
