= Chen Jiunn-ming =

Taiwanese footballer and manager (born 1970)

Personal information
- Full name: Chen Jiunn-ming (陳俊明)
- Date of birth: 30 June 1970 (age 56)
- Place of birth: Changhua, Republic of China (Taiwan)
- Position: Midfielder

Team information
- Current team: Taipower
- Number: 12

Youth career
- 1985–1988: Pei Men

Senior career*
Years	Team	Apps	(Gls)
1988–1991	Taiwan PE College		
1991–1993	Lukuang		
1993–2010	Taipower		

International career
1989–	Chinese Taipei		

Managerial career
- 2001–: Pei Men
- * Club domestic league appearances and goals

Chen Jiunn-ming (Chinese: 陳俊明; pinyin: Chén Jùnmíng, born 30 June 1970 in Changhua) is a Taiwanese football player and manager. As a player, he plays for Taiwan Power Company F.C. and the Chinese Taipei national football team as an attacking midfielder. As a manager, he coaches the National Pei Men Senior High School football team and serves as an assistant coach of the Chinese Taipei national football team.

== Career ==
Chen began playing football at the age of 10. He joined the school football team while studying at Guan Yu Elementary School (管嶼國小) in his hometown of Changhua. He later attended Fusing Junior High School (福興國中) in 1982 and National Pei Men Senior High School, the then high school football power in southern Taiwan, in 1985. During his three years at Pei Men, the team won 4 championships and 1 runner-up award in major domestic competitions.

In 1986, Chen played for the junior Chinese Taipei national team in the 1987 FIFA World Youth Championship qualification of the OFC, to which the Republic of China (Taiwan) belonged at the time, in New Zealand. Three years later, in New Zealand, he made his senior team debut in the 1990 FIFA World Cup qualification. He gradually became an essential member of the national team during the 1990s.

After serving in the military and the Lukuang football team, Chen joined the Taiwan Power Company F.C. in 1993. He witnessed and participated in the years of Taipower's 10 consecutive first-division champion titles from 1994 to 2004.

In 2001, Pei Men Senior High School, his alma mater, began enrolling students specializing in football and invited Chen to join its coaching staff. Under the guidance of Chen and other Pei Men coaches, the team won the league title in the 2006 High School Football League season, and he received the Best Coach award as well. Besides coaching in Pei Men, Chen did not end his playing career at Taipower and even won the Golden Shoe award in the 2002 season of the Chinese Taipei National Football League. He has expressed, "My form improved as I trained myself as my players."

In 2005, Chen was appointed assistant to Toshiaki Imai, then manager of the Chinese Taipei national team.

== Career statistics ==
Club	Season	League		Asia		Total	
Club	Season	Apps	Goals	Apps	Goals	Apps	Goals
Taipower	2005	?	?	0	0	?	?
Taipower	2006	?	?	-	-	?	?
Taipower	2007	?	?	-	-	?	?
Taipower	2008	?	?	2	0	?	?
Career totals		?	?	2	0	?	?

== Honors ==
With Taiwan Power Company F.C.

- Chinese Taipei National Football League
  - Champions: 1994, 1995, 1996, 1997, 1998, 1999, 2000–01, 2001–02, 2002–03, 2004, 2007, 2008
  - Runners-up: 1993, 2005, 2006
- CTFA Cup
  - Champions: 1997, 2000, 2002

Individual

- Chinese Taipei National Football League MVP: 1994
- Chinese Taipei National Football League Golden Shoe: 1999, 2002

=== Managerial titles ===
With Pei Men

- Highschool Football League
  - Champion: 2006

Individual

- Highschool Football League Best Coach: 2006
