= NTSH =

NTSH may refer to:

- New Taipei Municipal New Taipei Senior High School, a high school in Taiwan
- North Texas State Hospital, a hospital in the United States
- In informal writing it is an acronym for "Nothing to see here"
