= Engineering education in Taiwan =

Engineering is one of the most popular majors among universities in Taiwan. The engineering degrees are over a quarter of the bachelor's degrees in Taiwan. Because high-technology manufacturing is the main industry in Taiwan, there are many career opportunities for engineering majors in the country.

== Engineering Majors ==
Out of the top fifty popular majors in Taiwanese Universities, there are eleven engineering majors in the list.

Number	Majors	Popularity
3	Electrical Engineering	34,846
5	Information Technology	30,874
6	Electronic Engineering	30,255
7	Mechanical Engineering	30,029
13	Industrial Engineering	13,073
22	Civil Engineering	8,493
28	Chemical and Material Engineering	6,465
29	Communication Engineering	6,127
31	Chemical Engineering	5,854
33	Architectural Engineering	5,814
38	Computer Engineering	4,925
		Total 176,755/609256

== National Engineering Universities ==
- National Taiwan University (NTU)
- National Taiwan University of Science and Technology (NTUST)
- National Dong Hwa University (NDHU)
- National Taipei University of Technology (NTUT)
- National Taiwan Ocean University (NTOU)
- National Central University (NCU)
- National Chiao Tung University (NCTU)
- National Tsing Hua University (NTHU)
- National Chung Cheng University (CCU)
- National Cheng Kung University (NCKU)
- Shu-Te University (STU)
- National Kaohsiung Marine University (NKMU)
- National Sun Yat-sen University (NSYU)

== See also ==
- Engineering education
- Nuclear power in Taiwan
- Institute of Engineering Education Taiwan
- Education in Taiwan
