= Hung Chin-chang =

Taiwanese footballer and coach

Personal information
- Full name: Hung Chin-chang (洪金昌)
- Place of birth: Republic of China (Taiwan)
- Position: Goalkeeper

Youth career
- 1983–1986: Pei Men

International career
Years	Team	Apps	(Gls)
- Chinese Taipei U-23
- Chinese Taipei

Managerial career
- 2001–present: Pei Men

Hung Chin-chang (Chinese: 洪金昌) is a Taiwanese football coach and a former player. He played as goalkeeper for the Chinese Taipei national football team. Currently he coaches National Pei Men Senior High School football team. Present national team goalkeepers Lu Kun-chi and Chung Kuang-tien are his students.
