= Lin Chia-sheng =

Taiwanese footballer (born 1980)

Personal information
- Full name: Lin Chia-sheng (林家聖)
- Date of birth: 12 July 1980 (age 46)
- Place of birth: Tainan, Taiwan
- Height: 1.82 m (5 ft 11 1/2 in)
- Position: Midfielder

Youth career
- 1986–1992: Sheng Li ES
- 1992–1995: Gueiren JHS
- 1995–1998: Hsin Feng SHS
- 1999–2000: Ming Chuan Uni.

Senior career*
Years	Team	Apps	(Gls)
1997–2000	Taipei City Bank		
2000	Ming Chuan Uni.		
2001	NSTC		
2003	Taipei P.E. College		
2003–2004	NSTC		
2004–2005	Hayes		
2005–2007	Bolton Wanderers		

International career
1998	Chinese Taipei U-19	1	(1)
2000	Chinese Taipei U-23	1	(1)
2003	Chinese Taipei futsal	1	(6)
2004–	Chinese Taipei	1	(0)
- * Club domestic league appearances and goals

Lin Chia-sheng (Chinese: 林家聖; pinyin: Lín Jiāshèng; born 12 July 1980 in Tainan) is a Taiwanese football player. He has played for Taipei City Bank F.C. in Taiwan.

== Biography ==
=== Early years ===
Lin began to play football at the age of nine when he studied in Sheng Li Elementary School (Chinese: 勝利國民小學) in his home town Tainan. He later entered the football team of Guei Ren Junior High School (Chinese: 台南縣歸仁國中) and National Hsin-Feng Senior High School and started to play in the National First Division Football League with Taipei City Bank F.C. when he was 17. In 1998, he was enrolled into Ming Chuan University and assisted its football team to win the champion of National College Cup (Chinese: 大專杯).

However, 2000 was a miserable year for Lin. His mother loved football, and she used to drive to Tai-chung to watch the national hsin feng senior high football team play. Unfortunately she had an accident when traveling back to Chia-yi (嘉義) and injured her spine. As a result, Lin gave up his participation in the school football team and commuted between Taipei and Tainan every week to take care of his mother.

=== Move to England ===
After serving the military service, Lin determined to develop his career overseas. He joined the reserve team of Hayes in 2004, and then he contracted with the reserve team of Bolton Wanderers in January 2005. He was the first Taiwanese footballer joining European football club.

=== MLS tryouts ===
In the early 2007, Lin tried to move to the Major League Soccer of the United States due to lack of opportunities in England. Being one of the 900 participants competing in Los Angeles Galaxy's open tryouts, he was included in the final 24 but left out by the coaching staff eventually. Lin also challenged to Chivas USA, but he was not able to make the semifinals. In 2008 and 2009, Lin made several attempts in LA Galaxy's open tryouts but did not succeed. On 8 March, it was announced that Lin will go on another trial with LA Galaxy.

=== Tainan Football Camp ===
In Tainan, Lin founded the Tainan Football Camp (Chinese: 陽光樂活足球營, literally Sunshine Lohas Football Camp) which is sponsored by Spirox Education Foundation (Chinese: 蔚華教育基金會)and Chi Mei Corporation (Chinese: 奇美實業廠). He and his brother provide football trainings to the local children.
