= Shu-Te University =

Private university in Yanchao, Kaohsiung, Taiwan

- 樹德科技大學
- Type: Private
- Established: 1986 (as Shu-Te Institute of Technology); 2000 (as STU)
- Vice-president: Alan D. Yein, Wang Jau-shyong
- Location: Yanchao, Kaohsiung, Taiwan; 22.7642°N 120.3755°E
- Website: Official website

Shu-Te University
- Traditional Chinese: 樹德科技大學
Transcriptions
Standard Mandarin
- Hanyu Pinyin: Shùdé Kējì Dàxué
Southern Min
- Hokkien POJ: Sū-tek Kho-ki Tāi-ha̍k

Shu-Te University (STU; Chinese: 樹德科技大學; Pe̍h-ōe-jī: Sū-tek Kho-ki Tāi-ha̍k) is a private university in Yanchao District, Kaohsiung, Taiwan.

Shu-Te University offers a wide range of undergraduate and graduate programs in various fields, including engineering, design, management, humanities, social sciences, and health sciences.

The university has six colleges: the College of Engineering, the College of Design, the College of Management, the College of Humanities and Social Sciences, the College of Health Sciences, and the College of Continuing Education.

== History ==
STU was founded in 1986 as Shu-Te Institute of Technology. On 1 August 2000, it was renamed to Shu-Te University. Shu-Te University's art development workshop also manage and exhibit at Pier-2 Art Center.

== Faculties ==
- College of Applied Social Science
- College of Design
- College of Informatics
- College of Liberal Education
- College of Management

== Digital Technology and Game Design ==
In 2005, the first nationwide interaction and entertainment design (IED) program was established at Shu-Te University.

== Notable alumni ==
- Sun Shu-may, pop singer, actress and TV host

== See also ==
- List of universities in Taiwan
- Engineering education in Taiwan
