= National Hsin-Feng Senior High School =

Public school in Taiwan

Coordinates: 22.9727°N 120.2957°E

National Hsin-Feng Senior High School 國立新豐高級中學

Location
- No. 148, Section 1, Chung Cheng N. Rd, Guiren District, Tainan, Taiwan; Gueiren, Tainan, Taiwan

Information
- Type: Public
- Established: 1929
- Athletics: Association football
- Website: www.sfsh.tn.edu.tw

National Hsin-Feng Senior High School (Chinese: 國立新豐高級中學; pinyin: Hsin Feng Gāojí Zhōngxué) is a coed public senior high school located in Gueiren District, Tainan, Taiwan. It is well known for its men's football team.

== History ==
National Hsin-Feng Senior High School was founded as two-year Gueiren Agriculture School (Chinese: 歸仁農業補習學校) on 27 March 1929 in order to cultivate local young people to professionals on agriculture. It was later renamed to Gueiren Rural Youth School (Chinese: 歸仁農村青年學校) in 1935, Hsin-Feng Youth School (Chinese: 新豐青年學校) in 1936, Hsin-Feng Secondary School (Chinese: 新豐國民學校) in 1939, and eventually changed to three-year Hsin-Feng Vocational Agriculture School (Chinese: 新豐專修農業學校). Before 1945, the title of school was changed five times and there had been four principals.

In 1945, the school was renamed to Tainan County Hsin-Feng Primary Agriculture School. In August 1952, started to enroll female students and increased the class number to 8. New classrooms, laboratory and library were constructed one after another. In August 1956, the school was transformed to the five-year Tainan County Hsin-Feng Agriculture Vocational High School (Chinese: 台南縣立新豐農業職業學校). Foreign aid from the United States came in and helped to construct school buildings and to improve teaching facilities. In 1963, the Department of Domestic Affairs was set up.

On August 1, 1968, the government decided to extend compulsory education to 9 years. Therefore, the school was transformed to a comprehensive high school with both ordinary and vocational departments and renamed to Taiwan Provincial Hsin-Feng Senior High School (Chinese: 台灣省立新豐高級中學). The school stopped taking in vocational students in 1972. Since then, it concentrated on ordinary high school education and tried to balance the difference between urban and rural education. In 2000, renamed to National Hsin-Feng Senior High School (Chinese: 國立新豐高級中學).

Nevertheless, in 1996, the school was transformed to comprehensive high school and enroll vocational students again, offering more choices for students. Now National Hsin-Feng Senior High School has about 1200 students and the school campus occupies 8 hectares.

== Football team ==
Hsin-Feng SHS football team
- Full name: National Hsin-Feng Senior High School football team
- Ground: National Hsin-Feng Senior High School; Gueiren District, Tainan City
- League: Highschool Football League
- 2008: 6th place
Home colours	Away colours

National Hsin-Feng Senior High School football team has been established for about 40 years and is one of the most competitive senior high school teams in southern Taiwan.

On April 28, 2008, Hsin-Feng alumnus Lin Chia-sheng exposed in his blog the school's decision of stopping the football team. The principal Wang Jung-fa stated that the football team members sometimes caused trouble and did not help with the school's college entrance rate.

== Notable alumni ==
=== Football ===
- Yeh Hsien-chung
- Lin Chia-sheng

== See also ==
- Education in Taiwan
