= Chung Kuang-tien =

Taiwanese footballer

Personal information
- Full name: Chung Kuang-tien (鍾光田)
- Date of birth: 13 August 1989 (age 37)
- Place of birth: Republic of China (Taiwan)
- Height: 1.81 m (5 ft 11 in)
- Position: Goalkeeper

Team information
- Current team: Tatung
- Number: 73

Youth career
- 2004–: Pei Men

Senior career*
Years	Team	Apps	(Gls)
2006–present	Tatung	3	(0)

International career
2006–present	Chinese Taipei	1	(0)
- * Club domestic league appearances and goals as of January 22, 2007

Chung Kuang-tien (Chinese: 鍾光田, born 13 August 1989) is a Taiwanese football goalkeeper who currently plays for National Pei Men Senior High School football team and Tatung F.C. He made his first national team debut in 2010 AFC Challenge Cup qualifier against Brunei on April 8, 2009.

== Playing history ==
- National Pei Men Senior High School football team
- Tatung F.C.
