= Jiaqiang Ban =

- Traditional Chinese: 加強班
- Simplified Chinese: 加强班
- Literal meaning: Strengthening Class
Transcriptions
Standard Mandarin
- Hanyu Pinyin: Jiāqiáng Bān
Southern Min
- Hokkien POJ: Ka-kiông Pan

Jiaqiang Ban (Chinese: 加強班) are classes held by Taiwanese middle schools after school or on weekends, aiming to increase the enrollment rate of the school. These classes are banned by the Ministry of Education of Taiwan. The students that take part in these classes tend to have high grades in school.

== See also ==
- Buxiban
