= Hsing Wu High School =

Private senior high school in New Taipei, Taiwan

Coordinates: 25°4′50.9″N 121°23′44.1″E

The New Taipei Municipal Hsing Wu High School (Chinese: 醒吾中學; pinyin: Xǐngwú Zhōngxué) is a secondary school in Linkou District, New Taipei, Taiwan.

== History ==
Ku Huai-tsu (traditional Chinese: 顧懷祖; simplified Chinese: 顾怀祖; pinyin: Gù Huáizǔ; Wade–Giles: Ku Huai-tsu) founded the school in 1963. The school's first class had 113 students. The school was fully established in 1969.

== Notable alumni ==
- Pai Hsiao-yen

== See also ==
- Education in Taiwan
