= National Yilan Senior High School =

- 國立宜蘭高級中學
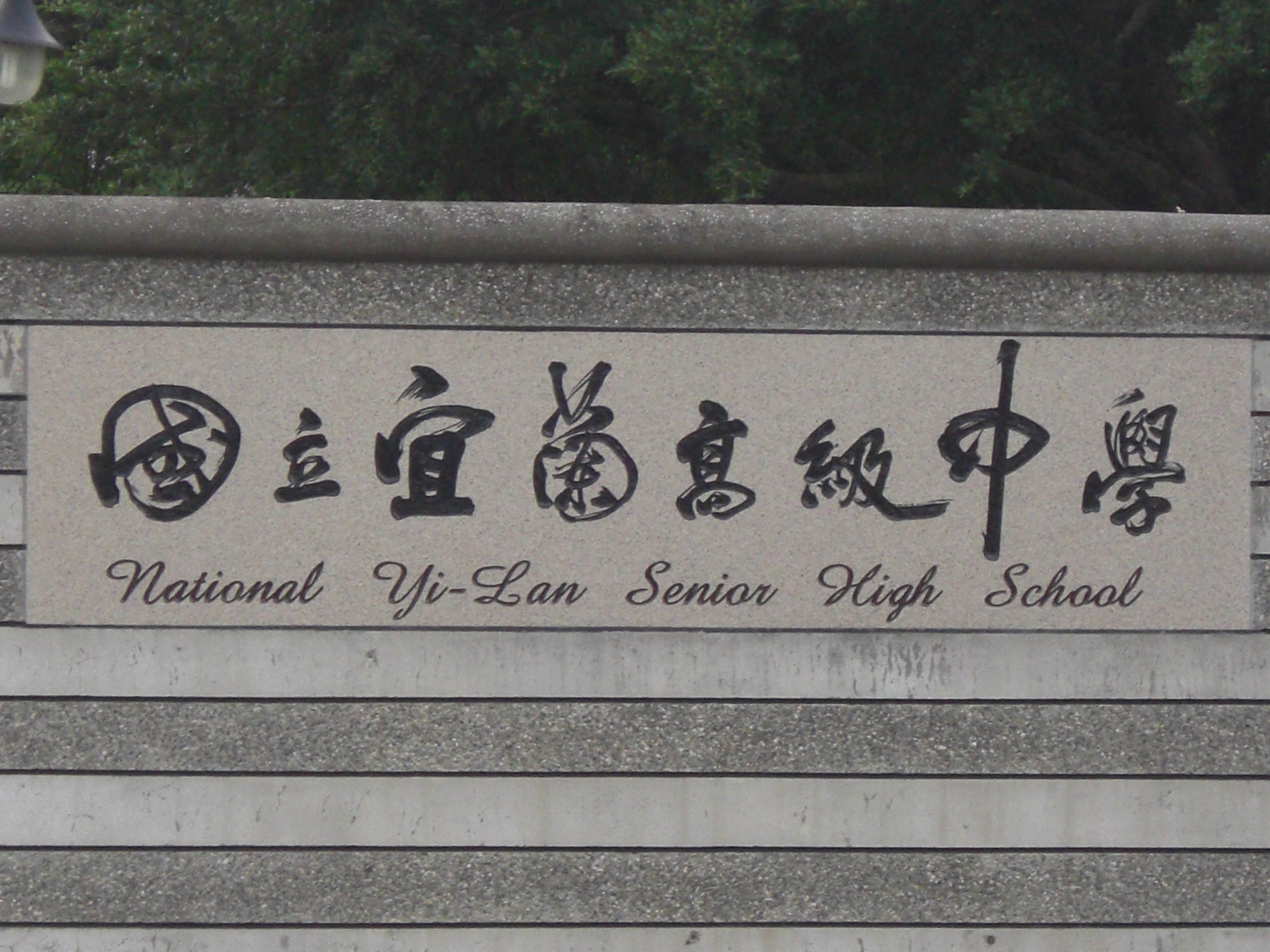

Location
- No. 8, Section 3, Fuxing Road; Yilan City, Yilan County 26051; Republic of China
- Coordinates: 24.7515°N 121.7425°E

Information
- Type: Public
- Established: February 16, 1941
- Athletics: Association football
- Website: www.ylsh.ilc.edu.tw

National Yilan Senior High School (YLSH; Chinese: 國立宜蘭高級中學) is a Taiwanese senior high school located in Yilan City, Yilan County. The school is famous for the Science achievement in the International Science Olympiad, Soccer and Basketball sports in east Taiwan. This school is a top ranked school in east Taiwan.

== History ==
YLSH was established in 1941 as Yilan Middle School (宜蘭中學校). In 1970, it changed its name to Taiwan Provincial Yilan Senior High School (省立宜蘭高級中學) and eliminated its junior high school department. In 2000, it was renamed to National Yilan Senior High School.

The school had been a boys school until 2000, when it admitted girls to apply to its Artist and Physical Experimental Departments. The enrollment now is 1709 students in 15 classes.

== Buildings and facilities ==
The total area of National Yilan Senior High School covers 7.9 hectares (approximately the size of 9.5 standard football pitches). Its main facilities include the Lin Feng Building, Huai Shan Building, Qin Xue Building, administrative headquarters, the library, Humanities Building, Science Building, Fine Arts/Health and Life Sciences Building, the Music Hall, and Student Activity Centre. The school also has a swimming pool, a sports field with a 400m running track, a tennis court, four badminton courts, three volleyball courts, four basketball courts, a greenhouse, a museum of school history, a school shop, and student dormitories. Many of the buildings have stood for many decades and offer a narrative of the year-by-year development and growth of the institute. Although these historical buildings are some of its most notable features, National Yilan Senior High School also continually strives to incorporate the new and keep abreast of modern developments.

== Football team ==
Yilan
- Full name: National Yilan Senior High School football team
- Short name: Yilan
- Founded: 1981
- Ground: National Yilan Senior High School; Yilan City, Yilan County
- Capacity: N/A
- Coach: Lin Wen-yu (林文郁)
- League: Highschool Football League
- 2007: 2nd or 3rd place
Home colours

The football team of National Yilan Senior High School was founded in 1981. They are traditionally one of the three powers of senior high school football in Taiwan along with National Pei Men Senior High School and National Hualien Senior High School. The team were initially consisted of students from common classes. In September, 1986, the School set up a physical education class and started to enroll football-specialized students from local junior high schools.

=== Notable players ===
- Huang Wei-yi
- Lo Chih-an
- Lo Chih-en

== Notable alumni ==
- Chen Ou-po, member of Legislative Yuan
- Justin Yifu Lin
- Yu Shyi-Kun
- Lin Yi-hsiung
- Chen Ding-nan

== See also ==
- Education in Taiwan
