= National Pei Men Senior High School =

Senior high school in Jiali, Tainan, Taiwan

Coordinates: 23.1674°N 120.1766°E

- Badge of National Pei Men Senior High School
- Jiali, Tainan, Taiwan

Information
- Established: 1946
- Athletics: Association football
- Website: www.pmsh.tnc.edu.tw

National Pei Men Senior High School (Chinese: 國立北門高級中學) is a senior high school located in Jiali District, Tainan, Taiwan.

== History ==
- March 29, 1946: Founded as Tainan County Pei Men Junior High School (Chinese: 台南縣立北門初級中學)
- August 1, 1947: Added senior high department and renamed to Tainan County Pei Men High School (Chinese: 台南縣立北門中學)
- August 1, 1952: Promoted as Taiwan Provincial Pei Men High School (Chinese: 臺灣省立北門中學)
- August 1, 1968: Stopped to enroll junior-high students
- August 1, 1970: Renamed to Taiwan Provincial Pei Men Senior High School (Chinese: 臺灣省立北門高級中學)
- February 1, 2000: Renamed to National Pei Men Senior High School

== Football team ==
Pei Men
- Full name: National Pei Men Senior High School football team
- Short name: Pei Men
- Founded: 1981
- Ground: National Pei Men Senior High School; Jiali District, Tainan City
- Capacity: N/A
- Coaches: Li Fu-tsai; Hung Chin-chang; Chen Jiunn-ming
- League: Highschool Football League
- 2007: Champion
Home colours	Away colours

Founded in August 1981, National Pei Men Senior High School football team was one of the most strongest senior high school football teams in Taiwan. The first squad consisted of players from local Jia Li Junior High School (Chinese: 佳里國民中學) and San Min Junior High School (Chinese: 三民國民中學) of Kaohsiung County (now part of Kaohsiung City). Numerous talented Taiwanese football youngsters who later played important roles in the Chinese Taipei national team and domestic first-division teams were brought up here, and they gained victories in many domestic and international competitions.

In this period, Pei Men welcomed gifted players from all corners of the nation. However, local youth training system was not established as well, and Pei Men soon encountered the crisis of lacking new players after other townships started to build up their own football teams. In 1992, Pei Men failed to win their 6th consecutive champion title in Taiwan High School Games, and, unfortunately, the team was then dissolved.

After nearly 10 years of silence, the school administrative staff reorganized the team in 2000 and enrolled new generation of local young footballers in 2001. Hung Chin-chang and Chen Jiunn-ming, both Pei Men alumni and notable Taiwanese football players, were engaged to join the coaching staff. In the first season of Highschool Football League in 2006, Pei Men won the champion and embraced all individual league awards (best coach, best player, and golden shoe).

== Current squad ==
Note: Flags indicate national team as defined under FIFA eligibility rules; some limited exceptions apply. Players may hold more than one non-FIFA nationality.

No.	Pos.	Nation	Player
1	GK	TAI	Wang Li-huan
2	GK	TAI	Zhang Lee-jyn
3	DF	TAI	Zhao Hi-sung
4	DF	TAI	Li Beng-сhao
5	DF	TAI	Chen Fang-hai
6	DF	TAI	Yang Kao-liang
7	DF	TAI	Wu Mian-mao
8	MF	TAI	Liu Pian-rang
9	FW	TAI	Huang Shang-teng
10	MF	TAI	Zhou Xiang-zhao
11	MF	TAI	Zhu Guang
12	MF	TAI	Lin Feng-kan

No.	Pos.	Nation	Player
13	MF	TAI	Gao Miao-di
14	MF	TAI	Xiao Di
15	MF	TAI	Xu Rao-pi
16	DF	TAI	Luo Sen-hu
17	MF	TAI	Deng Shih-xuan
18	MF	TAI	Ye Xiao-ming
19	FW	TAI	Han Shu-zhou
20	DF	TAI	Guo Qiong-shi
21	FW	TAI	Zhu Nie
22	GK	TAI	Hu Li
23	MF	TAI	Zing Jian-han
24	MF	TAI	Zing Jie-gan

=== Cradle of Goalkeepers ===
National Pei Men Senior High School [football team] is nicknamed "Cradle of Goalkeepers" for bringing up good goalkeepers. Lu Kun-chi and Chung Kuang-tien, current goalkeepers in the national team squad, are past and current Pei Men players respectively.

=== Honors ===
==== 1981-1991 ====
- Taiwan High School Games
  - Winners (7): 1983, 1985, 1987, 1988, 1989, 1990, 1991
  - Runners-up (2): 1982, 1986
- Chiang Kai-shek Cup
  - Winners (6): 1982, 1983, 1987, 1988, 1989, 1990
  - Runners-up (4): 1981, 1985, 1986, 1991
- Lee Wai Tong Cup
  - Winners (8): 1982, 1983, 1984, 1985, 1988, 1989, 1990, 1991
  - Runners-up (1): 1987

==== 2001-present ====
- Highschool Football League
  - Winners (3): 2006, 2007, 2008
- National Youth Cup
  - Winner (1): 2007
  - Runners-up (3): 2002, 2005, 2006
- National High School Games
  - Winner (1): 2003
  - Runner-up (1): 2004

== See also ==
- Education in Taiwan
