= Toshiaki Imai =

Japanese football manager (born 1954)

Toshiaki Imai 今井 敏明
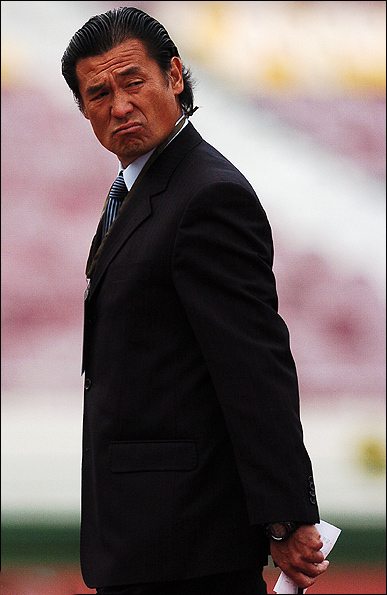
- Imai in 2006

Personal information
- Date of birth: 29 December 1954 (age 71)
- Place of birth: Saitama, Japan

Youth career
- 1970–1972: Urawa Nishi High School
- 1973–1976: Waseda University

Senior career*
Years	Team	Apps	(Gls)
1977–1981	Fujitsu		

Managerial career
- 1993–1994: Tokyo Gas
- 1996: Shiroki FC Serena
- 2000: Kawasaki Frontale
- 2005–2007: Chinese Taipei
- 2007: Taiwan Women
- 2011–2012: FC Ganju Iwate
- 2016: Taiwan
- 2016: Mongolia
- 2017: Global Cebu
- 2020: Taichung Futuro
- * Club domestic league appearances and goals

Toshiaki Imai (今井 敏明, Imai Toshiaki; born 29 December 1954) is a Japanese football manager and former player.

== Early life ==
Imai was born in Saitama Prefecture on 29 December 1954. He is a graduate of Waseda University.

== Playing career ==
Imai played for Fujitsu (later Kawasaki Frontale) from 1977 to 1981.

== Coaching career ==
After retirement, Imai became a manager for Tokyo Gas in 1993. He managed Shiroki FC Serena (1996), Kawasaki Frontale (2000).

In November 2005, Imai was appointed by Japan Football Association to coach Chinese Taipei national team and to help the football development in Taiwan. It was his first international assignment. He accepted the challenge and signed a one-year contract with Chinese Taipei Football Association in December. Under his guidance, although the team did not have any amazing performance in international competitions, it was believed that Imai did bring good influence on the team, as well as football activities in Taiwan.

On 15 December 2006, Imai extended his contract with CTFA. In addition to men's national team, he also led Chinese Taipei women's national team in the 2008 Olympic Games qualification in February 2007. In 2008, he returned to Japan and became the manager of Waseda University.

In 2016, Imai became manager of Chinese Taipei again, but was fired in October of that year after complaints of team disunity. By January 2017, he was already mentoring Global Cebu which is set to participate at the Philippines Football League as its head coach.

In 2020, Imai briefly coached Taiwan Football Premier League team Taichung Futuro.

== Managerial statistics ==
Team	From	To	Record				
Team	From	To	G	W	D	L	Win %
Kawasaki Frontale	2000	2000	15	3	3	9	20.00
Total			15	3	3	9	20.00
