= New Taipei Municipal New Taipei Senior High School =

Coordinates: 25.0867°N 121.4893°E

- 新北市立新北高級中學
- New Taipei Municipal New Taipei Senior High School Logo

Location
- No.1, Sanxin Rd., Sanchong Dist., New Taipei City, Taiwan, R.O.C, 241

Information
- School type: Public school
- Motto: respect, gratitude, faith and ambition
- Established: 1997
- Faculty: 117
- Grades: 10 - 12
- Enrollment: 2047(2013)
- Language: Standard Chinese (Traditional)
- Campus: Urban
- Colour: Orange
- Nickname: St. Orange High School
- Website: (zh) (en)

The New Taipei Municipal New Taipei Senior High School (NTSH; Chinese: 新北市立新北高級中學) is a Taiwanese senior high school located in Sanchong District, New Taipei City.

== Nickname ==
New Taipei Municipal New Taipei Senior High School (formerly National San Chung Senior High School) nickname came from a joke brought up by a school's history teacher in 2002. It came from the school's uniform color-orange. Because the school shares the same short name with Taipei County San Chung Senior High School in Chinese (both San Chung Senior High School, Chinese: 三重高中), they have been long confused by people. One day in a class when the teacher taught about Glorious Revolution and King William III of England, who was also Prince of Orange, he joked, "Why don't we change the school name to Orange Senior High School for distinction since our students all wear orange uniform jackets? Or St. Orange Senior High School would be even better if we want to emphasize it." Because the joke was so popular, people started to call it St. Orange Senior High School.

In addition, students of National San Chung Senior High School often call themselves Little Tangerine for the same reason.

== History ==
Established in 1997, its initial name was Taiwan Provincial San Chung Senior High School (Chinese: 台灣省立三重高級中學). After the administration of Taiwan Province Government was streamlined in 1998, the School became national and adopted the name National San Chung Senior High School (Chinese: 國立三重高級中學). In 2007, National San Chung Senior High School had 51 classes (17 classes per grade), including music classes and physical education classes, and more than 2000 students.

In 2013, Taiwan Provincial San Chung Senior High School changed its name to New Taipei Municipal New Taipei Senior High School. At present, New Taipei Municipal New Taipei Senior High School has a total of 67 classes (17 classes per grade), including music classes and physical education classes, and more than 2047 students. The school's campus measures roughly 75398 sq. meters.

== School Football team ==
Although National San Chung Senior High School does not have a long history, its football team has been considered one of the strongest among senior high school teams in Taiwan. The physical education classes were set up in July 2003, enrolling football- and athletics-specialized students.

=== Honours ===
- Highschool Football League
  - Runner-up (1): 2006
- National High School Games
  - Champion (1): 2006

== See also ==
- Education in Taiwan
