= Education in Taiwan =

Ministry of Education
- Minister: Cheng Ying-yao

National education budget (2025)
- Budget: NT$ 2.92 trillion

General details
- Primary languages: Mandarin, some courses and programs are in Taiwanese, Hakka, Formosan languages or English
- System type: National
- 12-year National Education: September 2019

Literacy (2017)
- Total: 98.87%
- Male: 99.73%
- Female: 97.69%

Enrollment (5,384,926^{1})
- Total: 2,153,717^{2}
- Primary: 1,676,970
- Secondary: 1,270,194^{3}
- Post secondary: —

The educational system in Taiwan is the responsibility of the Ministry of Education. The system produces pupils with some of the highest test scores in the world, especially in mathematics and science.

In 2015, Taiwanese students achieved one of the world's best results in mathematics, science and literacy, as tested by the Programme for International Student Assessment (PISA), a worldwide evaluation of 15-year-old school pupils' scholastic performance. Taiwan is one of the top-performing OECD countries in reading literacy, mathematics and sciences with the average student scoring 523.7, compared with the OECD average of 493, placing it seventh in the world and has one of the world's most highly educated labor forces among OECD countries. Current law mandates twelve years of schooling. Before the 12-year educational system was implemented in 2014, 95 percent junior high school students go on to a senior vocational high school, trade school, junior college, or university.

In Taiwan, adhering to the Confucian paradigm for education where parents believe that receiving a good education is a very high priority for Taiwanese families and an important goal in their children's life. Many parents in Taiwan believe that effort and persistence matters more than innate ability if their children want to receive better grades in school. These beliefs are shared by the teachers and guidance counselors and the schools as they regularly keep the parents abreast on their child's overall academic performance in the school. Many parents have high expectations for their children, emphasize academic achievement and actively intervene in their children's academic progress by making sure that their children receive top grades and would go on to great sacrifices including borrowing money to put their child through university.

Due to its role in promoting Taiwan's economic development, high test results, and high university entrance rate, Taiwan's education system has been praised. 45 percent of Taiwanese aged 25 to 64 hold a bachelor's degree or higher. However, the education system has been criticized for its overemphasis on rote memorization and excessive academic pressure it places on students. Students in Taiwan are faced with immense pressure to succeed academically from their parents, teachers, peers, and society in order to secure prestigious white collar job positions while eschewing vocational education, critical thinking, and creativity. With a narrow bandwidth of prestigious job positions and a far greater number of university graduates seeking them, many have been employed in lesser positions with salaries far below their expectations. Taiwan's universities have also been criticized for not keeping up with the technological trends and employment demands in its fast moving job market referring to a skills mismatch cited by a number of self assessed and overeducated university graduates. In addition, the Taiwanese government has been criticized for undermining the economy as it has been unable to create enough jobs to support the demands of the numerous unemployed university graduates.

== History ==
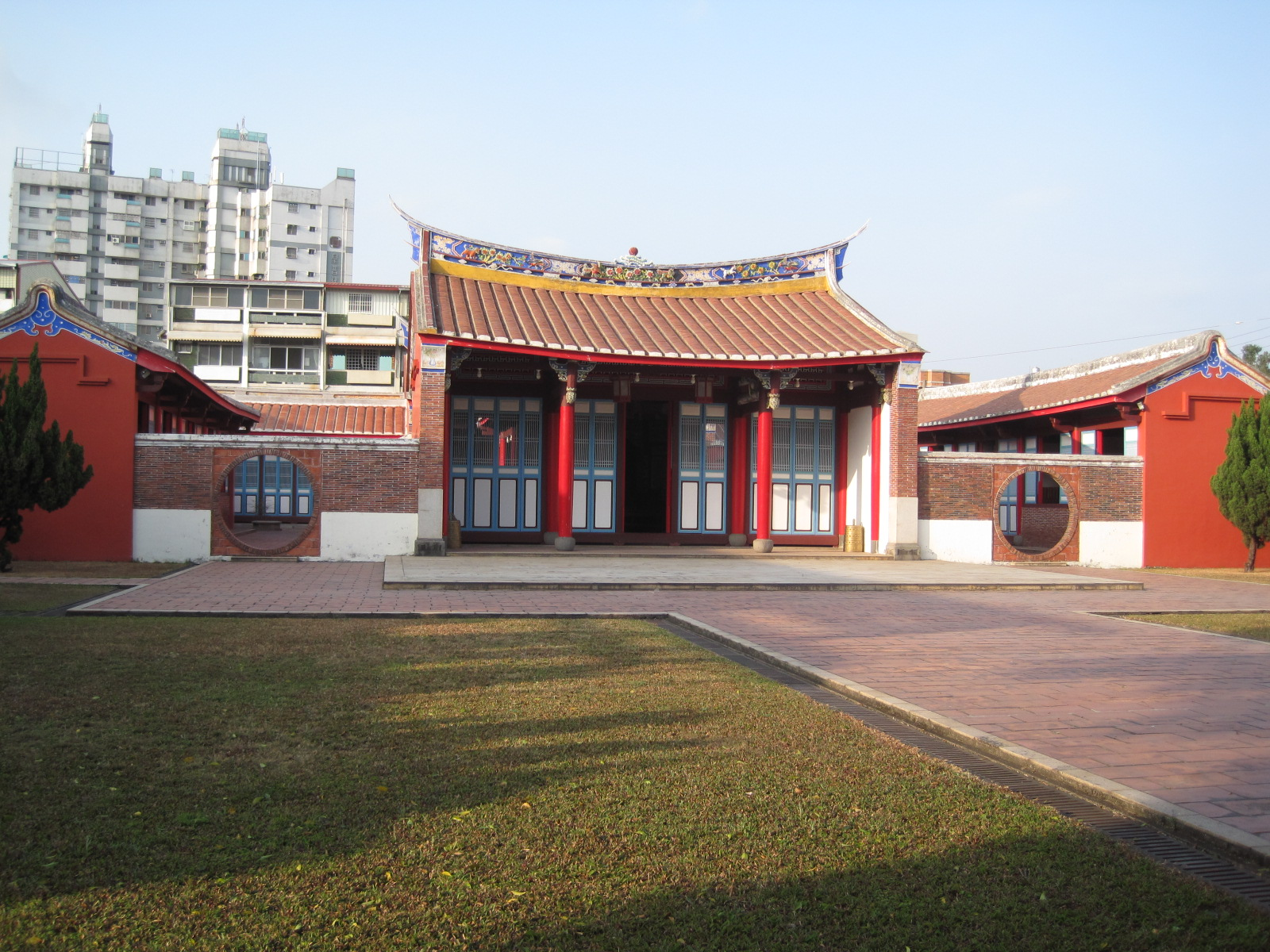
Pingtung Academy in Pingtung County

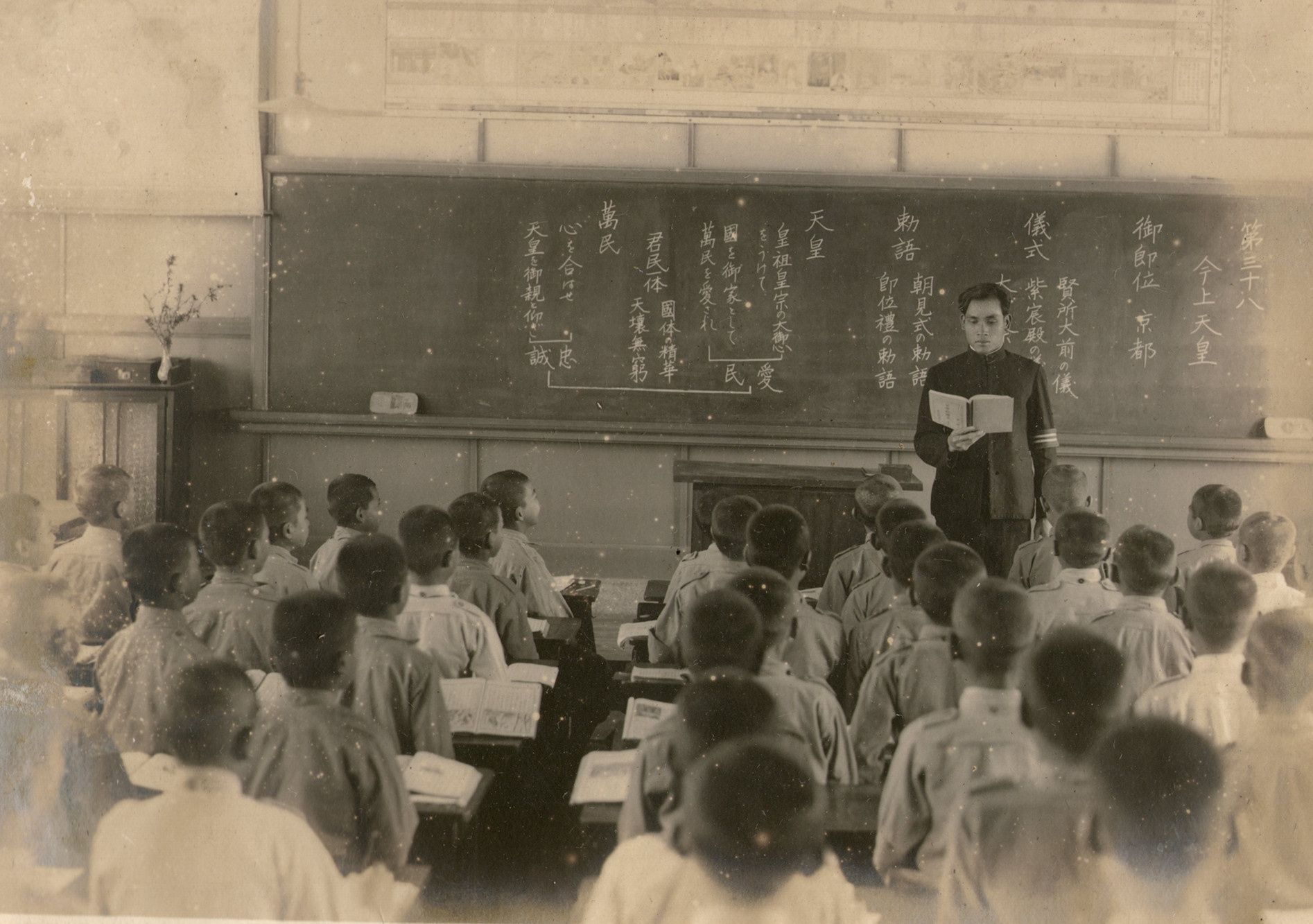
Elementary school students attending classes during the Japanese period

The Dutch East India Company, the Ming Chinese loyalists under Koxinga, Qing China, and the Japanese all implemented education systems on Taiwan. Christianity was taught under Dutch rule. Taiwan also had many academies, such as Daodong Academy, Fongyi Academy, Huangxi Academy, Jhen Wen Academy, Mingxin Academy and Pingtung Academy.

In 1944–1945, the Republic of China under the Chinese Nationalist Party led by Chiang Kai-shek took control of the island; the existing private school infrastructure was curtailed over suspicions of its political loyalty. After the retreat of the ROC to Taiwan in 1949, they sought to use public schools to assimilate the Taiwanese population; private schools, seen as an obstacle to this process, were suppressed. By 1954, however, the party yielded to calls for education reform, and began to revitalize and expand private schooling. The Nationalists used a number of measures (such as filling school boards with loyalists and careful control of state funding) to ensure that private schooling remained under state influence.

== Public education ==
The public education system in Taiwan spans nursery schools through university. Public education has been compulsory from primary school through junior high school since 1968. In August 2011, the Executive Yuan confirmed that a full twelve-year compulsory education program would be implemented by 2014. As part of the same educational reforms, President Ma Ying-jeou had announced in January 2011 that financial support for preschool education would begin, starting with fee waivers.

Access to high school and university is controlled by a series of national exams. Discipline in public schools of all levels is generally very tight with school uniforms and morning reveille being the norm. Students of all levels through high school are responsible for cleaning their own classrooms and areas around the school, cleanup time being a daily ritual. Corporal punishment is officially banned, but many reports suggest it is still practiced by many teachers, due in no small part to the fact that most parents support it.

The school year consists of two semesters. The fall semester begins in early September and runs till late January or early February. Winter vacation typically runs from three to four weeks around the Lunar New Year. Spring semester begins following the Lantern Festival in mid February and ends in late June. From middle school on, many schools hold "optional supplementary classes" during winter and summer vacation as well as after normal school hours. Despite the name, in many cases participation is compulsory. The language of instruction is Mandarin.

== School grades ==
The school year is divided into two semesters. The first begins in the beginning of September and ends in January; the second begins in mid February and ends in late June.

Level	Grade	Age by September 1	Notes
Kindergarten	none	3–6	Preschool education Regulated by the Early Childhood Education and Care Act
Elementary school	1st	6	National education, compulsory education Regulated by the Primary and Junior High School Act
Elementary school	2nd	7	National education, compulsory education Regulated by the Primary and Junior High School Act
Elementary school	3rd	8	National education, compulsory education Regulated by the Primary and Junior High School Act
Elementary school	4th	9	National education, compulsory education Regulated by the Primary and Junior High School Act
Elementary school	5th	10	National education, compulsory education Regulated by the Primary and Junior High School Act
Elementary school	6th	11	National education, compulsory education Regulated by the Primary and Junior High School Act
Junior high school	7th	12	National education, compulsory education Regulated by the Primary and Junior High School Act
Junior high school	8th	13	National education, compulsory education Regulated by the Primary and Junior High School Act
Junior high school	9th	14	National education, compulsory education Regulated by the Primary and Junior High School Act
Senior high school	Senior High 1st (10th)	15	National education since 2019; Regulated by the Senior High School Education Act
Senior high school	Senior High 2nd (11th)	16	National education since 2019; Regulated by the Senior High School Education Act
Senior high school	Senior High 3rd (12th)	17	National education since 2019; Regulated by the Senior High School Education Act

The tertiary education and postgraduate education in Taiwan have different tracks and their years and grades varies.

Level	Typical length	Degree	Notes
Junior college	5 years after junior high school 2 years after senior high school	Associate degree	Regulated by the Junior College Act
University (Undergraduate)	4–7 years after senior high school 2 years after junior college	Bachelor's degree	Regulated by the University Act
University (Postgraduate)	1–4 years after bachelor's degree	Master's degree	Regulated by the University Act
University (Postgraduate)	2–7 years after master's degree	Doctor's degree	Regulated by the University Act

In addition, special education, adult education, and continuing education also exist in Taiwan following similar systems mentioned above.

== National Education ==
The current national basic education in Taiwan is 12 years education. The implementation of this compulsory education replaces the old 9 years education.

The 12 years education policy was originally proposed in 1983, but was delayed for financial reasons.

=== Elementary school ===
Elementary schools span grades 1 through 6, classes are held from Monday through Friday, typically from 7:30 AM through 4 PM (or noon on Wednesdays). Subjects include:

- Mandarin: The official language of instruction.
- Mathematics: Mathematics education begins with the basics and reaches introductory algebra and geometry by the 6th grade.
- Science: Comprehensive science classes covering basic biology, physics, and chemistry.
- English: English is a compulsory subject within the mainstream school system from Grade 3 Elementary School and up.
- Native languages: Additional language classes in Taiwanese and Hakka Chinese are offered.
- Social studies
- Music
- Art

Like junior high schools, students are typically assigned to the elementary school closest to their registered place of residence. This leads some parents to file their children's household registration with other relatives or friends for the purpose of sending their children to what are perceived as better schools.

=== Junior high school ===
Junior high school spans grades 7 through 9 and is the last half of compulsory education. Junior high students typically focus on preparing for the national senior high school entrance exams at the end of 9th grade. School ends around 5PM, but students often stay in school later for quizzes and additional exam preparations.

Subject matter covered includes:

- Literature: Classical and modern Chinese literature and poetry, composition and public speaking.
- Mathematics: Covers single and two variable algebra, geometry, proofs, trigonometry, and pre-calculus.
- English: Contains essential English grammar
- Science & Technology
  - Biology: Taken during first year, includes more in depth studies and lab work.
  - Chemistry: Taken during second year. More rigorous introduction to atoms, molecule, and chemical reactions, including lab work.
  - Physics: Taken during second year. More rigorous introduction to physical laws and equations, including lab work.
  - Earth Science: Taken during third year.
  - Technology: Taken during the whole three years. Introduce some basic technology in daily life.
- Social Studies
  - Civics: Basic demotics, politics, and economics.
  - History: Focus on the history of Taiwan and China during the first two years, and world history during third year.
  - Geography: Contain introductive geography accompanied with geography of Taiwan during first year, geography of China and East Asia during second year, and the world geography during third year.
- Home economics & crafts
- Art: Inclusive of three independent parts: Fine Art, Music, and Drama.
- PE
- Scout education: Outdoor survival skills.

At the end of their third year, students participate in the national senior high school entrance exams and are assigned to senior high schools based upon their scores. Students may also participate in a separate national vocational school entrance exam if they wish to attend vocational school. In both cases, public schools are usually the most popular while private schools have traditionally been viewed as a backup for those unable to score high enough for public schools.

Roughly 94.7% of junior high school students continue on to senior high or vocational school.

=== Regular senior high school ===
Senior high school spans grades 10 through 12, again the main goal of students is to score highly on the national university entrance exams at the end of their third year. The pace is just as, if not more intense than junior high school.

Discipline in educational institutions from high school and up (including vocational schools) is the responsibility of military officers stationed at the individual schools (as opposed to elementary and junior high school where teachers and school administrators were responsible for discipline). In addition to the normal subjects, students are also required to attend a military education class covering issues such as civil defense, military drills, national defense, and basic firearms. In the past, high (and vocational) school students were expected to take on civil defense duties in the event of national emergency. Boys and girls were trained to use firearms and hurl grenades.

In many high schools incoming students may select science or liberal arts tracks depending on where their interests lie. The different learning tracks are commonly referred to as groups. Group I consists of liberal arts students, Group II and Group III of science based students (the latter studies biology as an additional subject). Science based curriculum consists of more rigorous science and mathematics classes intended to prepare the student for a career in the sciences and engineering; the liberal arts track places a heavier emphasis on literature and social studies to prepare students for a future in those fields. Often, students in Group I are exempted to study science even if they wish to, and students in Group II are not required to take geography, civics and history.

Entrance to university is administered via two methods: by recommendations or by taking the national university entrance examination. For those that participate in recommendations, they have to take a national academic exam and select a list of majors that they are applying to. The first stage is a screening of exam results for eligibility and the second stage would be dependent on the conditions of individual departments selected. For those that did not choose to take the recommendations process, or have failed their applications, they have the choice to participate in the national university entrance exams after graduation in hopes of university admission. Students who graduate from a senior high school usually end up taking up the national university entrance examination to enter a general four year university. They can also apply to junior colleges, an institute of technology, or a university of science and technology as an alternative choice.

=== Skill-based senior high school ===
In June 2016, "vocational high schools" were renamed as skill-based senior high schools. Vocational training and related career choices are introduced through course electives in lower secondary school. Skill-based senior high schools are three-year institutions that are similar to regular senior high schools. Unlike regular senior high schools, they place a heavier emphasis on practical and vocational skills. These schools offer a variety of programs that cater to the needs of students with different abilities and skills. Skill-based senior high schools offer programs that are organized into six different categories: agriculture, industry, business, marine products, everyday life sphere, and art. Graduates of senior skill-based senior high schools can choose to enter the workforce, start their own business, or go on to higher education. Senior skill-based senior high school graduates can apply to junior colleges, institutes of technology, and universities of science and technology. They can also take the national university entrance exams to enter general four-year universities.

== Higher education ==
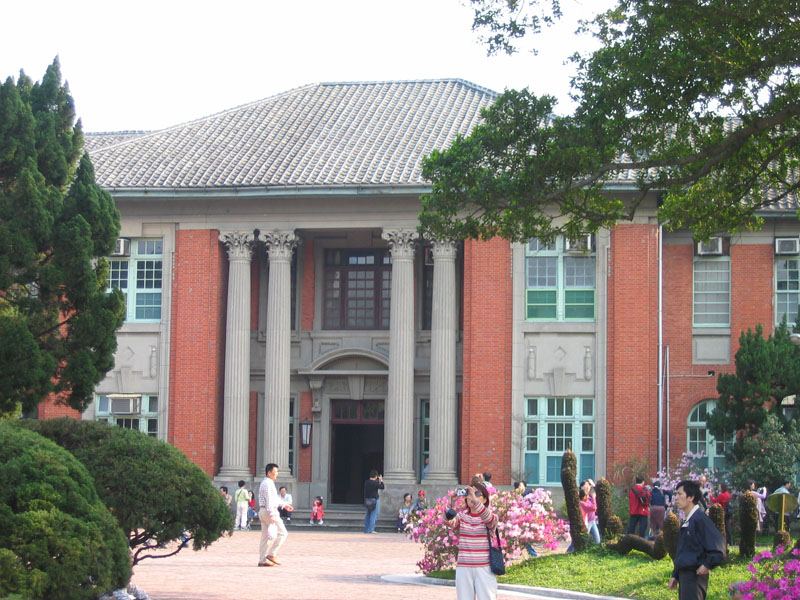
National Taiwan University

=== University ===
University entrance is the traditional route taken by Taiwanese students to enter the gateway of higher education as it is by far the most prestigious form of higher education in Taiwan. Since 2008, the percentage of high school graduates entering university has exceeded 95 percent. The Taiwanese higher education system is similar to the American higher education system. Since the 1990s many trade schools and junior colleges have been "promoted" to university status as results of a series of educational reform, which can account for the Taiwan's high university entrance rate. Even though a high score is desired as an admission criterion to the nations most esteemed and prestigious institutions, as consequences of such reforms, the job market is flooded with unemployed university graduates.

==== Overview ====
Scholars distributions in the north by 2015.
University	Number of scholars
National Taiwan University	2066
National Taiwan Normal University	894
National Chengchi University	744
Fu Jen Catholic University	728
National Central University	663
National Chiao Tung University	735
National Tsing Hua University	838
National Yang-Ming University	402
Sum	6342

Taiwan has many universities, both public and private. Tuition is less expensive in public universities than in private universities, like in most western countries. Many public universities receive financial support from the government. There are currently five University alliances in Taiwan, intentionally modeled after other educational systems such as the University of California system. NTNU is the internationally top-ranked university for linguistics especially for foreigners interested in learning (advanced) Mandarin, and also has the largest institute in Taiwan dedicated to second-language learners of Mandarin.

Some private schools are supported by commercial groups or religious bodies (such as Fu Jen Catholic University, Tzu Chi University).

Engineering is popular, and engineering degrees account for over a quarter of the bachelor's degrees awarded in Taiwan. It is also related to future employment opportunities because of the government policy focusing on high-tech manufacturing industries. See also: Engineering education in Taiwan

===== Public =====
Some of the highly regarded public universities in Taiwan include: (Research = Designated National Research University)

- North, Research
  - National Taiwan University (NTU): Research, formerly Taihoku Imperial University, Taiwan's representative public university, founded in Japanese era. Distinguished programs in all fields. AACSB accredited.
  - National Tsing Hua (NTHU), Yang Ming Chiao Tung (NYCU), and National Central (NCU).
- North, General
  - National Chengchi (NCCU) and Taiwan Normal (NTNU).
- Central
  - National Chung Hsing University: Well known for programs in agriculture and biology.
- South
  - National Cheng Kung University (NCKU): Research, Best known for engineering, medicine, science programs. One of only two higher ranking universities in Taiwan that offer aerospace engineering program. There is a possible bright future with private spaceflight working for privately owned non-governmental spaceflight companies or later on at NSPO.
  - National Sun Yat-sen University: Research, Distinguished programs in oceanography, computer science, optoelectronics, nanotechnology, political science, sociology and business management programs. AACSB accredited.
- East
  - National Dong Hwa University: Best known for engineering, physical science, social science, education, sustainability management, indigenous studies, business management, creative writing, and TCSL program.

===== Private =====
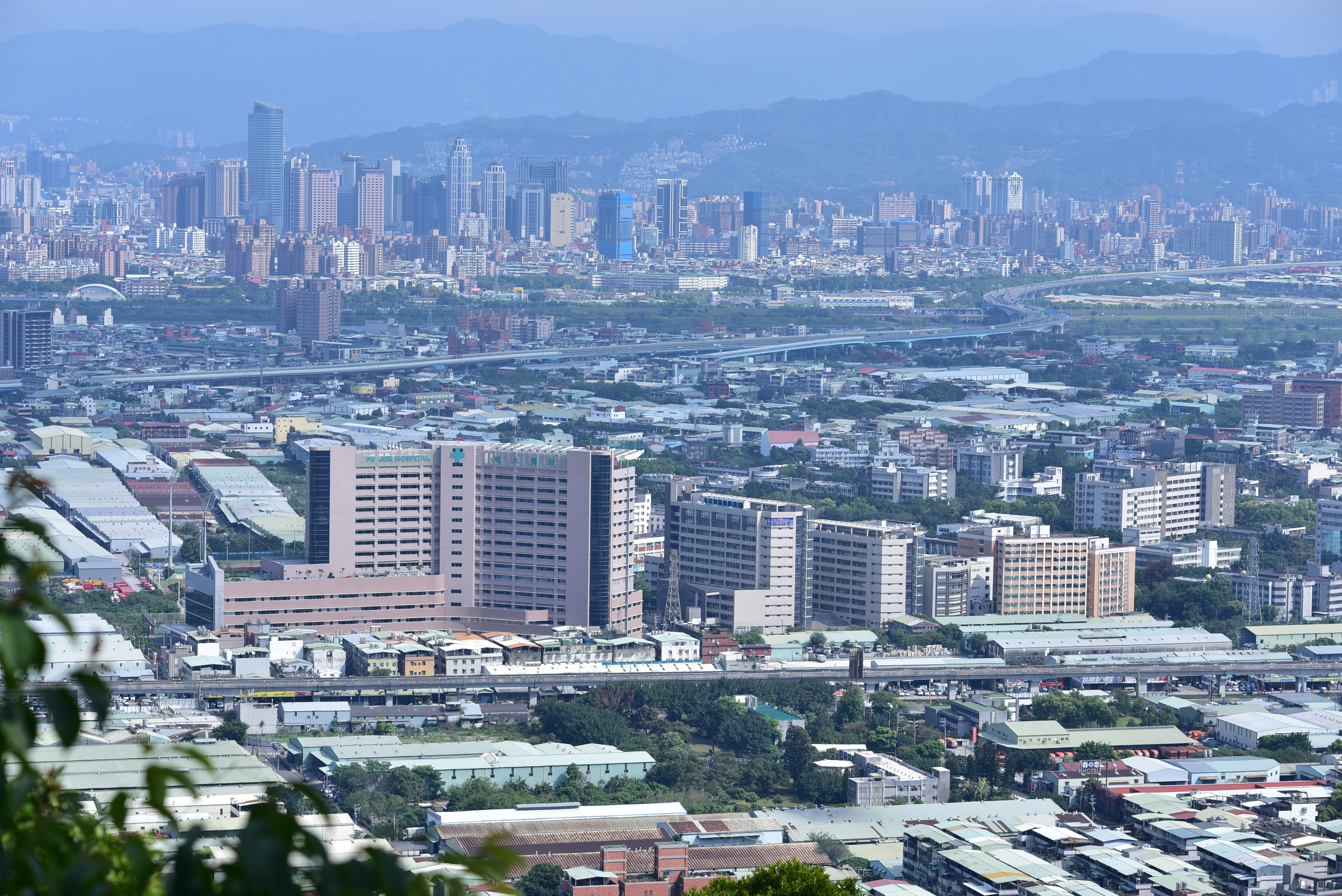
Auxiliary Fu Jen Catholic University Hospital

There are also a few representative private universities:

- Fu Jen Catholic University: Well known for programs Foreign Languages and Literatures, Philosophy, Law, Business Management (AACSB accredited), Theology, Fine Arts, Social Sciences and Communication. It is notable for having established the first graduate-level program in Conference Interpreting in Taiwan. The student body also consists of many international students.
- Soochow University: Well known for studies in Law, Accounting, foreign languages and literature and political science.

In contrast with junior high and high school, where students are pressured by the highly selective entrance exams, college life in Taiwan is generally seen as being rather relaxed. Graduate degrees from the U.S. and Europe are also highly prized with many students applying to foreign graduate schools after completing university (though the number has declined somewhat in recent years). An average of 13,000 university graduates per year choose to pursue graduate studies in the U.S.

==== Founded by Japanese government (1895–1945) ====
Year	School name	Original name
1911	National Chung Hsing University	Advanced Academy of Agronomy and Forestry
1922	National Taiwan Normal University	Taihoku College
1928	National Taiwan University	Taihoku Imperial University
1931	National Cheng Kung University	Tainan Technical College

==== Similarities with universities in China ====
Many universities in Taiwan were originally established in Republic of China before the retreat of the ROC government from Mainland to Taiwan after the Chinese Civil War. Some of the universities who were originally established in the Mainland were reestablished in Taiwan. To avoid ambiguity, the ROC government generally added the National word in front of those universities in Taiwan to differentiate them with the ones in China.

Year	Universities in Taiwan	Year	Universities in China
1951	Soochow University	1900	Soochow University
1956	National Tsing Hua University	1911	Tsinghua University
1958	National Chiao Tung University	1896	Shanghai Jiao Tong University
1961	Fu Jen Catholic University	1925	Catholic University of Peking
1980	National Sun Yat-sen University	1924	Sun Yat-sen University
1995	National Chi Nan University	1906	Jinan University

==== Teaching Excellence Universities Award ====
The Ministry of Education in Taiwan started the Teaching Excellence Universities Award in 2006. Since the beginning of this award, only six universities have earned this honor every year.

==== Medical school ====
Medical school in Taiwan begins as an undergraduate major and lasts six years (six years for dentistry), with the final two years being hands on training at a teaching hospital. Graduates of medical school may elect to continue on to graduate school to pursue a doctoral degree.

==== Law school (College of Law) ====
There are no law schools in the sense of US law schools. Many universities have college of law or department of law, provide legal education as an undergraduate major and lasts for four years.

==== Teacher training ====
Most higher educational institutions offering programs in education. Such programs run four years, in addition to a half-year internship, with students receiving teaching credentials at the end of the program. They also have to take extra test for being a teacher in public school. While currently education programs are available in most institutes of tertiary education, prospective teachers typically go to a "university of education" if they want to teach primary school, and a "normal university" for secondary school. One exception is National Changhua University of Education, which, like normal universities, is renowned for its dedication to cultivating secondary school teachers.

===== Teachers' In-service Advancement Education Information & Resources =====
With the implementation of reformation of education policy in Taiwan, in order to integrate the resources of teachers' in-service advancement education and to encourage teachers to participate in the in-service advancement education activities positively, the Ministry of Education established 12 regional teacher's in-service advancement education centers in 2003. The National Kaohsiung Normal University (NKNU) was chosen as the general coordinator and was responsible for setting up, managing the Nationwide Teacher In-Service Education Information Web.

The Nationwide Teacher In-Service Education Information Web provides teachers with a communication platform for in-service teacher advancement education in Taiwan. That is to encourage teachers to have a continuous growth in teaching. The information of advancement activities and teachers’ participation records are shown by digital platform.

This network provides activities and individual's learning records for K–12 teachers. This database-technology platform is in an electronic format to record teacher's training progress and learning time. It establishes a regulating mechanism to integrate educational and administrative resources from education institutions and local authorized educational authorities respectively. That is for fulfilling the ideals of educational reform in an effective way.

The purposes of Nationwide Teacher In-service Advancement Education Information Web are as follows:

- To provide a platform about in-service education information for teachers teaching in K–12 schools. It also has the information about validate training hours and training records in electronic format, etc. It will enable teachers from all over the country to review their whole lifelong training records and will help promote the policies about teachers’ in-service advancement education.
- To establish a regulating mechanism for integrate educational and administrative resources from education institutions and local authorized educational authorities. It will help training organizations to plan training activities and programs that meet the needs of teachers who participate in the in-service education.
- To supply course information and requests, and to open different training options and ways for teachers. It will be a great help for administrators in policy making and teachers can get trainings nearby.
- To provide in-service advancement education consultation and communication channels for teachers. It will solve teachers’ problems effectively and increase the opportunities of receiving suggestions.
- To supply records in teachers’ training detail for education organizations, establish a frame of reference with educational policy-making, and fulfill the needs of educational reform.

==== Graduate school ====
Each college in each university usually has their own graduate schools. In addition, the Taiwan International Graduate Program affiliated to Academia Sinica, the national academy of Taiwan, offers an English-language program in life sciences and physical sciences for both Taiwanese and international students.

Doctoral programs in Taiwan last two to seven years; most are four years.

==== International programs ====
International programs in Taiwan include bachelor's, master's and PhD degree programs targeted at students from abroad.

=== Vocational ===
Vocational education in Taiwan is offered at junior colleges, institutes of technology, and at universities of science and technology where they can earn associate degrees to doctoral degrees. There are currently 87 institutions in Taiwan that offer vocational training. The Ministry of Education has been promoting vocational education and trying to persuade young Taiwanese to consider vocational schools as an alternative route to attending university.

==== Junior colleges ====
Junior colleges can be classified into five-year junior colleges and two-year junior colleges according to entry requirement. Since 2004, they offer associate degrees under Article 29 of the Junior College Law. Various subjects that are covered by junior colleges include marine resources, medicine, languages, home economics, and tourism and hospitality.

===== Five-year junior colleges =====
Students enter five-year junior colleges after graduating junior high school and passing a national exam. The curriculum is similar to that of vocational schools with the exception that five-year junior colleges run for two additional years. Students are required to complete 220 credit hours in these programs. Upon graduation, students are awarded an associate degree.

===== Two-year junior colleges =====
Two-year junior colleges offer advanced vocational training for graduates of vocational or senior high schools. Two-year junior college programs are attended by vocational senior high school graduates or graduates of a university of science and technology. They also accept students who have completed a vocational program during high school. Upon graduation, students are awarded an associate degree. Graduates of two-year junior colleges can choose to enter the workforce, start their own business, pursue additional studies at a two-year institute of technology program in a department of their choice or choose to pursue additional education at a four-year university. tào Lo

==== Institutes of Technology and Universities of Science and Technology ====
Under the University Act, institutes of technology and universities of science and technology offer associate's, bachelor's, master's, and doctoral degree programs. Both institutes of technology and universities of science and technology admit students who have graduated from a junior college or those holding a similar academic qualification and have undertaken an entrance exam. Two-year and four-year bachelor programs at institutes of technology and universities of science and technology. A bachelor's degree is awarded to a student who has completed 128 credit hours after graduating from a four bachelor's degree program. Two-year bachelor's degree programs are for students who already hold an associate degree and have completed 80 credit hours. Master's degrees require an additional 24 credits while PhD students have to complete an additional 18 credits along with a dissertation.

== Private education ==
Private educational institutions are pervasive in Taiwan ranging from private schools at all levels to supplementary cram schools or buxiban.

=== Cram schools ===
With the intense pressure placed on students to achieve by parents, many students enroll in private after-school classes intended to supplement their regular education. These cram schools are an extremely large (and profitable) business in Taiwan and have been criticized by some as being the result of cultural overemphasis on academic achievement. Popular subjects in cram schools include English, mathematics, and physics. Cram schools are mostly popular amongst junior and senior high school students.

Classes are generally very orderly and controlled, with class sizes as high as 200 or so students in some well-known institutions. The quality of cram schools varies considerably. Some of the larger schools and chains write their own programs and produce their own textbooks.

=== Kindergartens and preschool ===
While many public kindergartens and preschools exist in Taiwan, private kindergartens and preschools are also quite popular. Many private preschools offer accelerated courses in various subjects. Curriculum at such preschools often encompasses subject material such as science, art, physical education and even mathematics classes. The majority of these schools are part of large school chains, which operate under franchise arrangements. In return for annual fees, the chain enterprises may supply advertising, curriculum, books, materials, training, and even staff for each individual school.

There has been a huge growth in the number of privately owned and operated English immersion preschools in Taiwan since 1999. These English immersion preschools generally employ native English speaking teachers to teach the whole preschool curriculum in an ‘English only’ environment. The legality of these types of schools has been called into question on many occasions, yet they continue to prosper. Some members of Taiwanese society have raised concerns as to whether local children should be placed in English immersion environments at such a young age, and have raised fears that the students abilities in their mother language may suffer as a result. The debate continues, but at the present time, the market for English Immersion Preschools continues to grow.

In October 2016, Education Minister Pan Wen-chung said that the Executive Yuan will allocated a budget of NT$6.2 billion to establish 1,000 kindergartens over the next four years so that it can raise the percentage of children enrollment by 30–40% by 2020.

=== 3+3 High School system ===
Following the new policy of the test to enter senior high school (the CAP test), it is now wildly believed by the parents that it is better and more convenient for their children to not need to worry about continuing education from junior to senior high school by continuing education at the same private school. This system allows for students to skip the CAP test, otherwise known as "Comprehensive Assessment Program for Junior High School Students" and take only the university entrance exam after completion of senior high. Therefore, many senior high schools in Taiwan such as Private Nan Shan Senior High School started their own Junior departures.

== Other ==
=== Special Education Services in Taiwan ===
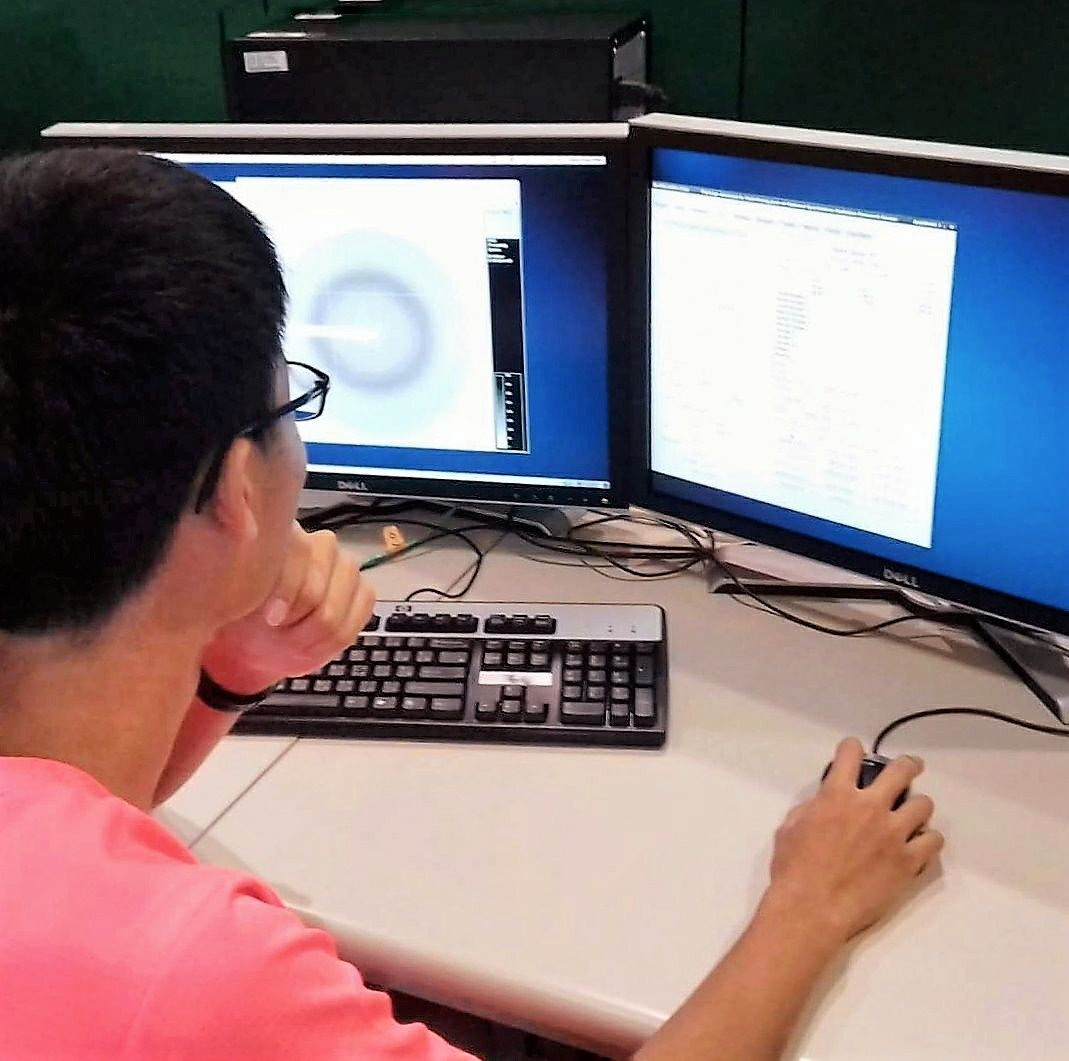
A Taiwanese high school student conducting an X-ray diffraction test for his science research project at the National Synchrotron Radiation Research Center. In Taiwanese high school, special education for the gifted often includes joint research programs with local universities.

As Special Education Act was announced in 1984, students with special needs started to receive special education services in Taiwan. Two subgroups were further classified by professionals in special education, including students with difficulties and students with giftedness. In order to provide support that meet students needs, three main ways of special education services are provided: centralized special education class, decentralized resource room, and itinerant resource program. Students from age 2 to 22 can receive special education services in the process of assessment, placement and educational provision.

=== Nursing education ===
- Contain three kind of education entry, after the education done, the student will be gained the qualifications participle National exam for professional nurse license.

=== Chinese as a second language ===
Taiwan has long been and with the growing popularity of learning Chinese internationally, an ideal destination for learning the language.

See: List of Chinese language schools in Taiwan

=== Students ===
In 2015, there were 40,000 students from mainland China studying in Taiwan, in which 34,114 of them were short-term exchange students.

== See also ==
- Academia Sinica
- Taiwan studies
- Scholarships in Taiwan
- Gender Equity Education Act (Taiwan)
- Cram school#Taiwan
- History of education in Taiwan
- Institute of Engineering Education Taiwan
- Jiaqiang Ban
- National Education Radio
- Engineering education in Taiwan
