= Chung Shan Industrial and Commercial School =

Private vocational school in Taiwan

Coordinates: 22°36′00″N 120°23′37″E

- 高雄市私立中山高級工商職業學校

Location
- Kaohsiung, Daliao

Information
- Type: Private vocational school
- Established: 1957 (Chung Shan High School); 1975 (Chung Shan Industrial and Commercial School)
- President: 蔡英文
- Principal: Kuo-Ching-Chen (陳國清)
- Staff: 60
- Faculty: 382
- Grades: 10–12
- Enrollment: 9894
- Area: 109,407 m^{2}
- Athletics: Football, Volleyball
- Website: www.csic.khc.edu.tw

The Chung Shan Industrial and Commercial School (CSIC; Chinese: 高雄市私立中山高級工商職業學校) is a vocational school in Daliao District, Kaohsiung, Taiwan. Furthermore, the school also famous for football and volleyball in Taiwan.

== See also ==
- Vocational school
