= National Hualien Senior High School =

Coordinates: 23.9869°N 121.6260°E

National Hualien Senior High School 國立花蓮高級中學
- No.42 Min-Chuan Rd; Hualien City, Hualien County; Taiwan

Information
- Motto: View the world as their own responsibility and urge their mercy and kindness by means of poems and books.
- Established: 5 June 1936
- Principal: Man-Fu Zhan (詹滿福)
- Staff: 18
- Faculty: 87
- Grades: 3
- Enrollment: 1503
- Website: Link

The National Hualien Senior High School (HLHS; Chinese: 國立花蓮高級中學) is a high school in Hualien City, Hualien County, Taiwan.

== History ==
HLHS was established in 1936 as Hualien Harbor Public School (花蓮港中學校) (Karenkō Public School) in the period of Imperial Japanese occupation. In 1945, after the Taiwan resurrection, renamed to Taiwan Provincial Hualien Harbor School (junior and senior High School). In 1946, it changed its name to Taiwan Provincial Hualien Senior High School (省立花蓮高級中學) and eliminated its junior high school department in 1968. In 2000, HLHS renamed to its current name.

The school had been a boys school until 2002, when it admitted girls to apply to its Musical and Physical Experimental Departments. The enrollment now is 1503 students in 39 classes.

== Facilities ==
The campus of HLHS features student dorms, teacher dorms, 3 general education building, an administration building, a 50-meter swimming pool, an indoor stadium featuring 6 badminton courts, an outdoor stadium with 2 tennis courts, a volleyball court, and 4 basketball courts, a multiple performance and convention center, a library building, science labs, a playground and a health center.

== Class Sections ==
- General Education Department (only for boys)
- Math and Science Education Department (only for boys)
- Musical Experimental Education Department
- Physical Experimental Education Department

== Notable alumni ==
- Jerry Chang (2001) is a guitarist and composer. Known for his song "Canon Rock", a rock arrangement of Johann Pachelbel's Canon in D.

== Sister School ==
Yaeyama Vocational High School, Yaeyama Islands, Okinawa Prefecture, Japan.

== See also ==
- National Hualien Girls' Senior High School
- Education in Taiwan
