= 2024 Taichung Futuro season =

Taichung Futuro
2024 season
- Owner: Yoshitaka Komori
- Head coach: Pen Wu-sung (AFC Cup); Fang Ching-ren (TMFL)
- TFPL: 2nd
- AFC Cup: Inter-zone play-off semi-finals
- Top goalscorer: League: Li Mao (10); All: Li Mao (10)
- Biggest win: Taipei Vikings 1–6 Futuro
- Biggest defeat: Abdysh-Ata Kant 5–0 Taichung Futuro

The 2024 Taichung Futuro season was the club's 6th season and their 6th season in Taiwan Football Premier League. Taichung Futuro also participated in the 2023–24 AFC Cup knockout stage as they qualified from the group stage in 2023.

== Kits ==
- Supplier: Joma (TFPL) / KICKER (AFC Cup)
- Main Sponsor: Hota-Gear

== Players ==
N	Pos.	Nat.	Name	Age.	Since
Goalkeepers
1	GK	(Chinese Taipei)	Lee Ming-wei	27	2020
21	GK	(Chinese Taipei)	Tuan Yu	30	2019
50	GK	(Japan)	Kenya Matsui	39	2023
99	GK	(Chinese Taipei)	Lin Chun-hua	22	2024
Defenders
3	DF	(Chinese Taipei)	Chen Ting-yang (captain)	32	2019
7	DF	(Japan)	Keisuke Ogawa	38	2019
8	DF	(Chinese Taipei)	Yoshitaka Komori	37	2019
14	DF	(Chinese Taipei)	Chen Chun-fu	23	2023
19	DF	(Chinese Taipei)	Li Ya-she	24	2024
24	DF	(Japan)	Koji Wada	23	2024
34	DF	(Chinese Taipei)	Lin Che-yu	31	2023
42	DF	(Chinese Taipei)	Liu Wei-che	21	2024
43	DF	(Chinese Taipei)	Liang Meng-hsin	21	2021
88	DF	(Japan)	Nagisa Sakurauchi	35	2024
Midfielders
6	MF	(Chinese Taipei)	Tsai Chieh-hsun	21	2023
9	MF	(Chinese Taipei)	Chen Hung-wei	27	2021
10	MF	(Japan)	Shohei Yokoyama	31	2021
12/31 (Note: Worn number 12 in domestic league and number 31 in AFC Cup.)	MF	(Chinese Taipei)	Wen Chih-hao	31	2024
22	MF	(Japan)	Takuro Uehara	33	2024
23	MF	(Japan)	Kaoru Takayama	36	2023
27	MF	(Japan)	Toshio Shimakawa	34	2024
Forwards
4	FW	(Chinese Taipei)	Tseng Te-lung	22	2023
5	FW	(Chinese Taipei)	Cheng Hao	27	2022
17	FW	(Chinese Taipei)	Hsu Heng-pin	31	2019
18	FW	(Chinese Taipei)	Li Mao	32	2019

== Transfers ==
=== In ===
No.	Pos.	Player	Transferred from	Fee	Source
Preseason
12/31	MF	Wen Chih-hao	(Chinese Taipei) AC Taipei	€30,000	
19	DF	Li Ya-she	–		
22	MF	Takuro Uehara	(Japan) Imabari		
42	DF	Liu Wei-che	(Chinese Taipei) Saturday Football International		
88	DF	Nagisa Sakurauchi	(Japan) Imabari		
Midseason
24	DF	Koji Wada	(Japan) Sendai University		
27	MF	Toshio Shimakawa	–		
99	GK	Lin Chun-hua	(Chinese Taipei) New Taipei Hang Yuen		

=== Out ===
No.	Pos.	Player	Transferred to	Source
Preseason
11	FW	Amari Oki	–	
13	DF	Shunya Suganuma	(Thailand) Khon Kaen United	
14	MF	Naoki Kaneko	(Chinese Taipei) New Taipei Hang Yuan	
15	MF	Kazuya Kojima	–	
19	MF	Genki Takatera	–	
25	MF	Kakeru Gunji	(Mongolia) Alliance ZHR	
27	FW	Fang Ching-ren	Retired	
31	GK	Tian Syuan-jin	–	
33	FW	Kotaro Nakajima	–	
42	DF	Juang Ming-yan	Retired	
51	GK	Taiki Itsukaichi	–	
99	FW	Jhon Benchy	(Chinese Taipei) Taipei Vikings	
Midseason
36	FW	Carlo Finotti	(Chinese Taipei) New Taipei Hang Yuen	

== Preseason and friendlies ==
9 June 2024 Friendly	Taichung Futuro (Chinese Taipei)	2–0	Macau	Kaohsiung
15:30 (UTC+8)	Cheng Hao 23'; Sakurauchi 69' (pen.)			Stadium: Kaohsiung Nanzih Football Stadium

== Competitions ==
=== Overall record ===
Competition	First match	Last match	Starting round	Final position	Record							
Competition	First match	Last match	Starting round	Final position	Pld	W	D	L	GF	GA	GD	Win %
TFPL	14 April 2024	1 December 2024	Matchday 1	2nd	21	13	4	4	41	19	+22	61.90
AFC Cup	23 August 2023	13 March 2024	Play-off round	Inter-zone semi-finals	2	0	0	2	1	8	−7	0.00
Total					23	13	4	6	42	27	+15	56.52

Source: TFPL AFC Cup

=== Taiwan Football Premier League ===
==== League table ====
Pos	Team	Pld	W	D	L	GF	GA	GD	Pts	Qualification or relegation
1	Tainan City TSG (C)	21	15	4	2	60	16	+44	49	Qualification for the AFC Challenge League preliminary stage
2	Futuro	21	13	4	4	41	19	+22	43	Qualification for the AFC Challenge League preliminary stage
3	New Taipei Hang Yuen	21	12	3	6	33	19	+14	39	
4	Sunny Bank AC Taipei	21	11	3	7	35	23	+12	36	
5	Taipower	21	9	3	9	36	26	+10	30	
6	Leopard Cat	21	6	4	11	24	35	−11	22	
7	Ming Chuan University	21	5	3	13	23	47	−24	18	Transfer to 2025–26 Taiwan Football Premier League qualifiers
8	Taipei Vikings (R)	21	0	2	19	17	84	−67	2	Relegation to Taiwan Second Division Football League

(C) Champions; (R) Relegated

==== Results by round ====
Round	1	2	3	4	5	6	8	9	10	11	12	13	14	7^{1}	15	17	18	16	20	19	21
Result	D	W	W	L	W	W	W	W	W	W	D	W	W	W	W	L	D	D	L	L	W
Position	2	1	1	3	2	2	2	2	1	1	1	1	1	1	1	1	2	2	2	2	2

Source: TFPL
W = Win; D = Draw; L = Loss

^{1} Matchday 7 was postponed to 1 September 2024 due to the AFC Asian Qualifiers.

==== Matches ====
14 April 2024 1	Tainan City TSG	1–1	Futuro	Tainan
15:30 (UTC+8)	Yao Ko-chi (yellow card) 50'; Chen Jui-chieh 72'	Report	Li Mao 45'; Yokoyama (yellow card) 64'	Stadium: Tainan Municipal Football Field; Attendance: 300; Referee: Kuo Chia-hao

28 April 2024 2	Futuro	4–0	Ming Chuan University	Kaohsiung
15:30 (UTC+8)	Li Mao 24', 37'; Sakurauchi (yellow card) 26'; Ogawa (yellow card) 30'; Uehara (yellow card) 30'; Yokoyama 76', 90+4'	Report	Yu Yao-hsing (yellow card) 30'; Ma Liang-cheng (red card) 71'; Hsiung Yuan-kuan (yellow card) 76'	Stadium: Kaohsiung Nanzih Football Stadium; Attendance: 115; Referee: Kuo Chia-hao

5 May 2024 3	New Taipei Hang Yuen	0–1	Futuro	Taipei
15:30 (UTC+8)		Report	Takayama 21'; Yokoyama (yellow card) 45'; Sakurauchi (yellow card) 49'; Ogawa (yellow card) 51'	Stadium: Taipei Municipal Stadium; Attendance: 213; Referee: Chen Hsin-chuan

12 May 2024 4	Futuro	0–2	AC Taipei	Kaohsiung
15:30 (UTC+8)	Liang Meng-hsin (yellow card) 7'; Cheng Hao (yellow card) 64'	Report	Huang Wei-chieh 17'; Huang Sheng-chieh (yellow card) 50'; Chen You-lin (yellow card) 74'; Chen Kai-wen 83'	Stadium: Kaohsiung Nanzih Football Stadium; Attendance: 168; Referee: Kuo Chia-Hao

19 May 2024 5	Taipower	0–2	Futuro	Tainan
15:30 (UTC+8)		Report	Sakurauchi 45+2'; Cheng Hao 66'; Wen Chih-hao (yellow card) 79'; Chen Hung-wei (yellow card) 89'	Stadium: Tainan Municipal Football Field; Attendance: 250; Referee: Yu Ming-hsun

26 May 2024 6	Futuro	5–1	Taipei Vikings	Taichung
15:30 (UTC+8)	Takayama 8'; Li Mao 30', 32' (yellow card) 77'; Sakurauchi (yellow card) 36'; Cheng Hao 68', 80'	Report	Nien Chia-en 78'	Stadium: Taiyuan Football Field; Attendance: 88; Referee: Yang Chang-pei

16 June 2024 8	Futuro	1–0	New Taipei Hang Yuen	Taichung
15:30 (UTC+8)	Cheng Hao (yellow card) 66'; Yokoyama 76'; Ogawa (yellow card) 82'	Report	López (yellow card) 78'; Huang Yung-chun (yellow card) 84'	Stadium: Taiyuan Football Field; Attendance: 147; Referee: Kuo Chia-hao

23 June 2024 9	Sunny Bank AC Taipei	0–1	Futuro	New Taipei
15:30 (UTC+8)	Chen Yih-yan (yellow card) 58'; Ichiyanagi (yellow card) 70'; Huang Sheng-chieh (yellow card) 80'	Report	Tsai Chieh-hsun 48'; Li Mao (yellow card) 54'; Sakurauchi (yellow card) 90+1'	Stadium: National Taipei University; Referee: Liu Hsiang-shao

30 June 2024 10	Futuro	2–1	Taipower	Taichung
15:30 (UTC+8)	Yokoyama 53' (pen.); Cheng Hao 85'; Wen Chih-hao (yellow card) 90+2'	Report	Chen Chao-an (yellow card) 59'; Chen Po-hsun 70'; Yen Ho-shen (yellow card) 72'	Stadium: Taiyuan Football Field; Referee: Yang Chang-pei

4 August 2024 11	Taipei Vikings	1–6	Futuro	Kaohsiung
15:30 (UTC+8)	Yang Cheng-chun 16'; Peng Chia-en (yellow card) 71'	Report	Takayama 9'; Wen Chih-hao 14'; Li Mao 18', 46'; Liang Meng-hsin 61'; Li Ya-she 80'	Stadium: Kaohsiung Nanzih Football Stadium; Referee: Kuo Chan-yu

11 August 2024 12	Futuro	1–1	Leopard Cat	Taoyuan
15:30 (UTC+8)	Chen Chun-fu (yellow card) 23'; Hsu Heng-pin 30'; Sakurauchi (yellow card) 55'; Liang Meng-hsin (yellow card) 81'	Report	Argueta 36'	Stadium: Ming Chuan University; Referee: Ko Chuan-yao

18 August 2024 13	Futuro	1–0	Tainan City TSG	Taichung
16:00 (UTC+8)	Li Mao 18'; Ogawa (yellow card) 64'; Tseng Te-lung (yellow card) 90+2'	Report	Kim Sang-jun (yellow card) 63'; Chen Jui-chieh (yellow card) 90+2'	Stadium: Taiyuan Football Field; Referee: Chen Hsin-chuan

25 August 2024 14	Ming Chuan University	0–4	Futuro	Taoyuan
18:30 (UTC+8)	Chen Yen-jui (yellow card) 59'	Report	Uehara 1'; Takayama 4'; Hsu Heng-pin 8'; Li Mao 49'; Wen Chih-hao (yellow card) 54'	Stadium: Ming Chuan University; Referee: Liu Hsiang-shao

1 September 2024 7	Leopard Cat	1–2	Futuro	Kaohsiung
15:30 (UTC+8)	Yamazaki 50'	Report	Sakurauchi 23'; Takayama 28' (yellow card) 88'	Stadium: Kaohsiung Nanzih Football Stadium; Referee: Kuo Chan-yu

14 September 2024 15	Futuro	4–0	Taipei Vikings	Taoyuan
15:30 (UTC+8)	Chen Ting-yang 8'; Shimakawa (yellow card) 31' (goal) 82'; Uehara 41'; Wen Chih-hao 55'	Report		Stadium: Ming Chuan University; Referee: Lin Ching-tang

29 September 2024 17	Tainan City TSG	7–3	Futuro	Tainan
18:30 (UTC+8)	Gamaroni 10', 63'; Porto 18'; Kim Sung-kyum (yellow card) 31'; Cortés 45+4', 80'; Wu Chun-ching 88'; Kuo Po-wei 90'	Report	Chen Wei-chuan 22' (o.g.); Liang Meng-hsin (yellow card) 45+5'; Chen Ting-yang (yellow card) 54'; Takayama 67' (pen.), 78'	Stadium: Tainan Municipal Football Field; Referee: Kuo Chan-yu

20 October 2024 18	Futuro	1–1	Ming Chuan University	Kaohsiung
15:00 (UTC+8)	Tseng Te-lung 58'; Wen Chih-hao (yellow card) 65'; Takayama (yellow card) 84'; Ogawa (red card) 90+6'	Report	Chen Yen-jui (yellow card) 43'; Li Po-yu (yellow card) 70'; Ng Pui-hei 90+4' (yellow card) 90+5'	Stadium: Kaohsiung Nanzih Football Stadium; Referee: Wang Chieh

24 October 2024 16	Leopard Cat	0–0	Futuro	Taichung
18:30 (UTC+8)	Shih Cheng-hsi (yellow card) 86'	Report	Chen Ting-yang (yellow card) 55'; Wen Chih-hao (yellow card) 68'	Stadium: Xitun Football Field; Referee: Hsu Min-yu

3 November 2024 20	Futuro	0–1	Sunny Bank AC Taipei	Taichung
15:00 (UTC+8)	Shimakawa (yellow card) 61'	Report	Ichiyanagi 90+1'	Stadium: Xitun Football Field; Referee: Yu Ming-hsun

24 November 2024 19	New Taipei Hang Yuen	1–0	Futuro	New Taipei
15:00 (UTC+8)	Benchy 16' (pen.); Wang Po-ying (yellow card) 90+2'; Huang Yung-chun (yellow card) 90+4'	Report	Komori (red card) 90+9'	Stadium: Fu Jen Catholic University; Referee: Liu Hsiang-shao

1 December 2024 21	Taipower	1–2	Futuro	Kaohsiung
15:00 (UTC+8)	Hsu Po-chieh 47'; Chen Chao-an (yellow card) 48'; Chen Po-hsun (yellow card) 81'; Tseng Chih-wei (yellow card) 90'	Report	Li Mao 65' (pen.); Cheng Hao 86'	Stadium: Kaohsiung Nanzih Football Stadium; Referee: Kuo Chan-yu

=== AFC Cup ===
==== Knockout stage ====
6 March 2024 Inter-zone play-off semi-finals	Abdysh-Ata Kant (Kyrgyzstan)	5–0	(Chinese Taipei) Taichung Futuro	Bishkek
18:00 (UTC+6)	Zhyrgalbek uulu 14'; Batyrkanov 45+1'; Shamurzaev (yellow card) 60'; Uzdenov 85'; Akhmataliev 87'; Çaryyew 90'	Report	Lin Che-yu (yellow card) 2'	Stadium: Dolen Omurzakov Stadium; Attendance: 4,059; Referee: Bijan Heydari (Iran)

13 March 2024 Inter-zone play-off semi-finals	Taichung Futuro (Chinese Taipei)	1–3	(Kyrgyzstan) Abdysh-Ata Kant	Kaohsiung
16:00 (UTC+8)	Benchy 2'; Uehara (yellow card) 33'; Sakurauchi (yellow card) 62'; Wen Chih-hao (yellow card) 73' (yellow-red card) 90+3'	Report	Shamurzaev (yellow card) 16'; Musabekov 60'; Uzdenov 63'; Sarykbaev 81'	Stadium: Kaohsiung Nanzih Football Stadium; Attendance: 115; Referee: Yahya Almulla (United Arab Emirates)

== Statistics ==
=== Squad statistics ===
No.	Pos	Nat	Player	Total		TFPL		AFC Cup	
No.	Pos	Nat	Player	Apps	Goals	Apps	Goals	Apps	Goals
Goalkeepers
1	GK	(Chinese Taipei) TPE	Lee Ming-wei	0	0	0	0	0	0
21	GK	(Chinese Taipei) TPE	Tuan Yu	4	0	2+2	0	0	0
50	GK	(Japan) JPN	Kenya Matsui	21	0	19	0	2	0
99	GK	(Chinese Taipei) TPE	Lin Chun-hua	1	0	0+1	0	0	0
Defenders
3	DF	(Chinese Taipei) TPE	Chen Ting-yang	17	1	15+2	1	0	0
7	DF	(Japan) JPN	Keisuke Ogawa	19	0	17	0	2	0
8	DF	(Chinese Taipei) TPE	Yoshitaka Komori	17	0	1+14	0	2	0
14	DF	(Chinese Taipei) TPE	Chen Chun-fu	12	0	4+6	0	0+2	0
19	DF	(Chinese Taipei) TPE	Li Ya-she	4	1	2+2	1	0	0
24	DF	(Japan) JPN	Koji Wada	4	0	4	0	0	0
34	DF	(Chinese Taipei) TPE	Lin Che-yu	12	0	2+8	0	1+1	0
42	DF	(Chinese Taipei) TPE	Liu Wei-che	5	0	1+4	0	0	0
43	DF	(Chinese Taipei) TPE	Liang Meng-hsin	22	1	17+3	1	2	0
88	DF	(Japan) JPN	Nagisa Sakurauchi	22	2	20	2	2	0
Midfielders
6	MF	(Chinese Taipei) TPE	Tsai Chieh-hsun	9	1	3+4	1	0+2	0
9	MF	(Chinese Taipei) TPE	Chen Hung-wei	18	0	2+16	0	0	0
10	MF	(Japan) JPN	Shohei Yokoyama	10	4	9	4	1	0
12/31 (Note: Worn number 12 in domestic league and number 31 in AFC Cup.)	MF	(Chinese Taipei) TPE	Wen Chih-hao	22	2	19+1	2	2	0
22	MF	(Japan) JPN	Takuro Uehara	21	2	20	2	1	0
23	MF	(Japan) JPN	Kaoru Takayama	21	7	19	7	2	0
27	MF	(Japan) JPN	Toshio Shimakawa	12	1	12	1	0	0
Forwards
4	FW	(Chinese Taipei) TPE	Tseng Te-lung	15	1	10+5	1	0	0
5	FW	(Chinese Taipei) TPE	Cheng Hao	21	5	5+14	5	1+1	0
17	FW	(Chinese Taipei) TPE	Hsu Heng-pin	13	2	8+3	2	1+1	0
18	FW	(Chinese Taipei) TPE	Li Mao	22	10	20+1	10	1	0
Players who left during the season but made an appearance
99	FW	(Haiti) HAI	Jhon Benchy	2	1	0	0	2	1
Own goals (0)

=== Goalscorers ===
Rank	No.	Pos.	Nat.	Player	TMFL	AFC Cup	Total
1	18	FW	(Chinese Taipei)	Li Mao	10	—	10
2	23	MF	(Japan)	Kaoru Takayama	7	—	7
3	5	FW	(Chinese Taipei)	Cheng Hao	5	—	5
4	10	MF	(Japan)	Shohei Yokoyama	4	—	4
5	12/31 (Note: Worn number 12 in domestic league and number 31 in AFC Cup.)	MF	(Chinese Taipei)	Wen Chih-hao	2	—	2
5	17	FW	(Chinese Taipei)	Hsu Heng-pin	2	—	2
5	22	MF	(Japan)	Takuro Uehara	2	—	2
5	88	DF	(Japan)	Nagisa Sakurauchi	2	—	2
9	3	DF	(Chinese Taipei)	Chen Ting-yang	1	—	1
9	4	FW	(Chinese Taipei)	Tseng Te-lung	1	—	1
9	6	MF	(Chinese Taipei)	Tsai Chieh-hsun	1	—	1
9	19	DF	(Chinese Taipei)	Li Ya-she	1	—	1
9	27	MF	(Japan)	Toshio Shimakawa	1	—	1
9	43	DF	(Chinese Taipei)	Liang Meng-hsin	1	—	1
9	99	FW	(Haiti)	Jhon Benchy	—	1	1
Own goals (from the opponents)					1	0	1
Totals					41	1	42

=== Cleansheets ===
Rank	No.	Nat.	Player	TFPL	AFC Cup	Total
1	50	(Japan)	Kenya Matsui	8	0	8
2	21	(Chinese Taipei)	Tuan Yu	3	—	3
3	99	(Chinese Taipei)	Lin Chun-hua	1	—	1
4	1	(Chinese Taipei)	Lee Ming-wei	—	—	0
Totals				12	0	12

=== Disciplinary record ===
No.	Pos.	Nat.	Name	TFPL			AFC Cup			Total		
No.	Pos.	Nat.	Name	Booked	(yellow card) (yellow-red card)	Sent off (straight red)	Booked	(yellow card) (yellow-red card)	Sent off (straight red)	Booked	(yellow card) (yellow-red card)	Sent off (straight red)
88	DF	(Japan)	Nagisa Sakurauchi	5			1			6		
12/31 (Note: Worn number 12 in domestic league and number 31 in AFC Cup.)	MF	(Chinese Taipei)	Wen Chih-hao	5				1		5	1	
7	DF	(Japan)	Keisuke Ogawa	4		1				4		1
43	DF	(Chinese Taipei)	Liang Meng-hsin	3						3		
3	DF	(Chinese Taipei)	Chen Ting-yang	2						2		
5	FW	(Chinese Taipei)	Cheng Hao	2						2		
10	MF	(Japan)	Shohei Yokoyama	2						2		
18	FW	(Chinese Taipei)	Li Mao	2						2		
23	MF	(Japan)	Kaoru Takayama	2						2		
27	MF	(Japan)	Toshio Shimakawa	2						2		
22	MF	(Japan)	Takuro Uehara	1			1			2		
4	FW	(Chinese Taipei)	Tseng Te-lung	1						1		
9	MF	(Chinese Taipei)	Chen Hung-wei	1						1		
14	DF	(Chinese Taipei)	Chen Chun-fu	1						1		
34	DF	(Chinese Taipei)	Lin Che-yu				1			1		
8	DF	(Chinese Taipei)	Yoshitaka Komori			1						1
Staff		(Japan)	Yuto Kabasawa	2						2		
Coach		(Chinese Taipei)	Fang Ching-ren			1						1
Totals				35		3	3	1		38	1	3

Ordered by (red card) , (second yellow card) and (yellow card)
(yellow card) = Number of bookings; (second yellow card) = Number of sending offs after a second yellow card; (red card) = Number of sending offs by a direct red card.

== Awards ==
=== Taichung Sports Awards Ceremony ===
- Taichung Futuro – Outstanding Group Award
