= 2025–26 Taichung Futuro season =

Taichung Futuro
2025–26 season
- Owner: Yoshitaka Komori
- Head coach: Fang Ching-ren
- Main grounds: Xitun Football Field; Taiyuan Football Field
- TFPL: 4th
- President FA Cup: Semifinals
- ACGL: Preliminary stage
- Top goalscorer: League: Lai Yi-chiao (8); All: Lai Yi-chiao (12)
- Highest home attendance: 350
- Lowest home attendance: 75
- Average home league attendance: 167
- Biggest win: Taichung Futuro 7–0 Inter Taoyuan Grey
- Biggest defeat: Tainan City TSG Blue 5–0 Taichung Futuro
Home colours	Away colours

The 2025–26 Taichung Futuro season is the club's 7th season and their 7th season in Taiwan Football Premier League. They also compete in Taiwan President FA Cup and AFC Challenge League as they were the 2024 Taiwan Football Premier League runner-up.

== Kits ==
- Supplier: Joma
- Main Sponsor: Hota-Gear (President FA Cup) / Taichung City Government (TFPL/ACGL)

== Management team ==
Position	Name
Head coach	(Chinese Taipei) Fang Ching-ren
Assistant coach	(Japan) Hayato Daimon
Athletic Trainer	(Chinese Taipei) Chiang Pei-ling

- Last updated: 11 July 2025

== Players ==
N	Pos.	Nat.	Name	Age.	Since
Goalkeepers
1	GK	(Chinese Taipei)	Lee Ming-wei	28	2020
21	GK	(Chinese Taipei)	Tuan Yu	31	2019
50	GK	(Japan)	Kenya Matsui	40	2023
99	GK	(Chinese Taipei)	Lin Chun-hua	23	2024
Defenders
3	DF	(Chinese Taipei)	Chen Ting-yang (captain)	33	2019
7	DF	(Japan)	Keisuke Ogawa	39	2019
8	DF	(Chinese Taipei)	Yoshitaka Komori	38	2019
15	DF	(Mongolia)	Munkh-Orgil Orkhon	27	2025
19	DF	(Chinese Taipei)	Li Ya-she	25	2024
34	DF	(Chinese Taipei)	Lin Che-yu	32	2023
42	DF	(Chinese Taipei)	Liu Wei-che	22	2024
43	DF	(Chinese Taipei)	Liang Meng-hsin	22	2021
88	DF	(Japan)	Nagisa Sakurauchi	36	2024
Midfielders
6	MF	(Chinese Taipei)	Tsai Chieh-hsun	22	2023
9	MF	(Chinese Taipei)	Chen Hung-wei	28	2021
10	MF	(Japan)	Shohei Yokoyama	32	2025
12	MF	(Chinese Taipei)	Wen Chih-hao	32	2024
16	MF	(Japan)	Shoya Nagata	28	2026
23	MF	(Japan)	Kaoru Takayama	37	2023
35	MF	(Japan)	Ryota Saito	24	2025
70/71 (Note: Worn number 70 in President FA Cup.)	MF	(Chinese Taipei)	Yu Chia-le	21	2025
70/71 (Note: Worn number 71 in President FA Cup.)	MF	(Chinese Taipei)	Peng Chuan-min	20	2025
72/77 (Note: Worn number 72 in President FA Cup.)	MF	(Chinese Taipei)	Lai Yi-chiao	18	2025
Forwards
4	FW	(Chinese Taipei)	Tseng Te-lung	23	2023
5	FW	(Chinese Taipei)	Cheng Hao	28	2022
17	FW	(Chinese Taipei)	Hsu Heng-pin	32	2019
18	FW	(Chinese Taipei)	Li Mao	33	2019

== Transfers ==
=== In ===
No.	Pos.	Player	Transferred from	Source
Preseason (winter transfer)
70/71	MF	Yu Chia-le	–	
70/71	MF	Peng Chuan-min	–	
72/77	MF	Lai Yi-chiao	–	
73	DF	Chen Hung-li	–	
74	MF	Lin Shih-yuan	–	
75	MF	Cheng Yu-chi	–	
76	MF	Chang Hsiu-yuan	–	
Preseason (summer transfer)
10	MF	Shohei Yokoyama	(Australia) Gold Coast Knights	
15	DF	Munkh-Orgil Orkhon	(Mongolia) Deren	
Midseason
16	MF	Shoya Nagata	(Kyrgyzstan) Neftchi Kochkor-Ata	

=== Out ===
No.	Pos.	Player	Transferred to	Source
Preseason (winter transfer)
10	MF	Shohei Yokoyama	(Australia) Gold Coast Knights	
14	DF	Chen Chun-fu	–	
22	MF	Takuro Uehara	Retired	
24	DF	Koji Wada	(Japan) Iwate Grulla Morioka	
27	MF	Toshio Shimakawa	(Japan) Sagamihara	
Preseason (summer transfer)
73	DF	Chen Hung-li	(Chinese Taipei) Taichung Futuro U19	
74	MF	Lin Shih-yuan	(Chinese Taipei) Taichung Futuro U19	
75	MF	Cheng Yu-chi	(Chinese Taipei) Taichung Futuro U19	
76	MF	Chang Hsiu-yuan	(Chinese Taipei) Taichung Futuro U19	

=== Loans in ===
No.	Pos.	Player	Loaned from	On loan until	Source
Preseason (summer transfer)
35	MF	Ryota Saito	(Japan) V-Varen Nagasaki	30 June 2026	

== Preseason and friendlies ==
14 March 2025 Friendly	Taichung Rock	3–1	Taichung Futuro	Taichung
19:30 (UTC+8)		RecapRecap		Stadium: Xitun Football Field

7 June 2025 Friendly	Taichung Futuro (Chinese Taipei)	2–2	Macau	Taichung
19:15 (UTC+8)				Stadium: Xitun Football Field

27 July 2025 TCRFC International Cup	Taichung Rock (Chinese Taipei)	1–4	(Chinese Taipei) Taichung Futuro	Taichung
16:00 (UTC+8)	Liu Chien-wei 15'	Report	Saito 13', 43'; Cheng Hao 52'; Lai Yi-chiao 68'	Stadium: Xitun Football Field; Referee: Yang Chang-pei

29 July 2025 TCRFC International Cup	Eastern (Hong Kong)	1–1	(Chinese Taipei) Taichung Futuro	Taichung
16:00 (UTC+8)	Scally 12'	Report	Saito 84'	Stadium: Xitun Football Field; Referee: Wen Wen-lung

Not played TCRFC International Cup	Rot Weiss Ahlen (Germany)	Cancelled	(Chinese Taipei) Taichung Futuro	Taichung
		Report		Stadium: Xitun Football Field
Note: Matched cancelled due to poor ground condition after the rain.

6 February 2026 Friendly	Taichung Futuro	2–1	Taipower	Taichung
10:30 (UTC+8)				Stadium: Xitun Football Field

== Competitions ==
=== Overall record ===
Competition	First match	Last match	Starting round	Final position	Record							
Competition	First match	Last match	Starting round	Final position	Pld	W	D	L	GF	GA	GD	Win %
TFPL	17 August 2025	24 May 2026	Matchday 1	4th	21	11	1	9	34	22	+12	52.38
President FA Cup	12 April 2025	28 May 2025	Group stage	Semifinals	6	5	0	1	19	7	+12	83.33
ACGL	12 August 2025	12 August 2025	Preliminary stage	Preliminary stage	1	0	0	1	1	3	−2	0.00
Total					28	16	1	11	54	32	+22	57.14

Source: TFPLPresident FA CupACGL

=== Taiwan Football Premier League ===
==== League table ====
Pos	Team	Pld	W	D	L	GF	GA	GD	Pts	Qualification or relegation
1	Tainan City TSG (C)	21	13	5	3	44	19	+25	44	Qualification for the AFC Challenge League qualifying play-offs
2	New Taipei Hang Yuan	21	13	2	6	35	15	+20	41	
3	Sunny Bank AC Taipei	21	11	6	4	29	22	+7	39	
4	Taichung Futuro	21	11	1	9	34	22	+12	34	
5	Taichung Rock	21	8	6	7	28	30	−2	30	
6	Tatung	21	6	6	9	27	28	−1	24	
7	Taipower	21	5	5	11	27	33	−6	20	Transfer to 2026–27 Taiwan Football Premier League qualifiers
8	Ming Chuan University (R)	21	1	1	19	14	69	−55	4	Relegation to Taiwan Football League Division 2

(C) Champions; (R) Relegated

==== Results by round ====
Round	1	2	3	4	5	6	7	8	9	10	11	12	13	14	15	16	17	18	19	20	21
Result	L	W	L	L	D	W	L	L	W	L	W	W	W	W	L	L	W	W	W	W	L
Position	5	3	6	8	7	5	7	7	6	7	5	4	4	4	4	5	4	4	4	4	4

W = Win; D = Draw; L = Loss

==== Matches ====
17 August 2025 1	Sunny Bank AC Taipei	2–1	Taichung Futuro	Taoyuan
16:00 (UTC+8)	Yamazaki 28'; Chen Yen-jui (yellow card) 63' (yellow-red card) 75'; Chen Yi-yen (yellow card) 76'; Takayama 87'; Huang Sheng-chieh (yellow card) 88'	Report	Wen Chih-hao (yellow card) 63'; Ogawa (yellow card) 65'; Sakurauchi 90+8'	Stadium: Ming Chuan University; Attendance: 122; Referee: Kuo Chia-hao

24 August 2025 2	Taichung Rock	0–1	Taichung Futuro	Taichung
19:00 (UTC+8)	Kao Kuan-yu (yellow card) 75'	Report	Li Mao 16'; Sakurauchi (yellow card) 63'; Komori (yellow card) 83'	Stadium: Xitun Football Field; Attendance: 253; Referee: Liu Hsiang-shao

14 September 2025 3	New Taipei Hang Yuan	2–0	Taichung Futuro	New Taipei
16:00 (UTC+8)	Tateiwa 7'; Lin Chen 58'	Report	Sakurauchi (yellow card) 34'; Mönkh-Orgil Orkhon (yellow card) 53'	Stadium: Fu Jen Catholic University; Attendance: 61; Referee: Chen Hsin-chuan

21 September 2025 4	Ming Chuan University	2–1	Taichung Futuro	New Taipei
16:00 (UTC+8)	Godoy 43'; Cheng Kai-wei (yellow card) 45+1'; Ro Ji-xian (yellow card) 74' (goal) 90+3'; Hsu Yu-jen (yellow card) 80'; Ng Pui-hei (yellow card) 83'	Report	Matsui (yellow card) 27'; Saito 73'; Sakurauchi (yellow card) 80'	Stadium: Fu Jen Catholic University; Attendance: 76; Referee: Liu Hsiang-shao

28 September 2025 5	Taichung Futuro	1–1	Taipower	Tainan
16:00 (UTC+8)	Saito 50'	Report	Lee Chun-chia (yellow card) 46'; Yeh Ching-chun 59'	Stadium: Tainan Municipal Football Field; Attendance: 227; Referee: Chen Hsin-chuan

26 October 2025 6	Taichung Futuro	5–0	Tatung	Taichung
15:30 (UTC+8)	Lai Yi-chiao 5', 23', 40'; Sakurauchi (yellow card) 15'; Wen Chih-hao 45'; Li Mao 68'	Report	Chen Jui-chieh (yellow card) 45+2'; Chao Wei-chieh (yellow card) 71'; Lai Yu-an (yellow card) 80'	Stadium: Taiyuan Football Field; Attendance: 350; Referee: Ko Chuan-yao

23 November 2025 8	Taichung Futuro	0–1	Sunny Bank AC Taipei	Tainan
15:30 (UTC+8)		Report	Uchida 28'; Kusuyama (yellow card) 38'; Chen Yu-lin (yellow card) 55'; Huang Wei-chieh (yellow card) 56'; Tsai Meng-chen (yellow card) 86'	Stadium: Tainan Municipal Football Field; Attendance: 123; Referee: Ko Chuan-yao

30 November 2025 9	Taichung Futuro	4–0	Taichung Rock	Taichung
18:30 (UTC+8)	Saito 42', 65'; Li Mao (yellow card) 48'; Chen Hung-wei 64'; Cheng Hao 79'	Report	Yamauchi (yellow card) 66'	Stadium: Xitun Football Field; Attendance: 219; Referee: Lin Te-en

7 December 2025 10	Taichung Futuro	1–2	New Taipei Hang Yuan	Taipei
15:30 (UTC+8)	Liang Meng-hsin (yellow card) 48'; Chen Ting-yang 81'	Report	Kang Tae-won 42', 50'	Stadium: Taipei Municipal Stadium; Attendance: 75; Referee: Yu Ming-hsun

14 December 2025 11	Taichung Futuro	3–1	Ming Chuan University	Taichung
18:30 (UTC+8)	Chen Hung-wei 4'; Hsu Heng-pin (yellow card) 35' (goal) 72'; Lai Yi-chiao 45+9'	Report	Godoy 19' (pen.); Li Po-yu (yellow card) 45+6'; Chu Chi-lung (yellow card) 83'; Chang Yu-cheng (yellow card) 87'	Stadium: Xitun Football Field; Attendance: 126; Referee: Chen Hsin-chuan

21 December 2026 12	Taipower	1–2	Taichung Futuro	Kaohsiung
18:30 (UTC+8)	Chiu Po-jui 15'; Tu Shao-chieh (yellow card) 54'; Chao Ming-hsiu (yellow card) 76'	Report	Mönkh-Orgil Orkhon (yellow card) 52'; Hsu Heng-pin (yellow card) 66'; Yokoyama 69' (pen.); Matsui (yellow card) 73'; Lin Che-yu (yellow card) 90+1'; Lai Yi-chiao 90+4'	Stadium: Kaohsiung Nanzih Football Stadium; Attendance: 416; Referee: Kuo Po-hung

1 March 2026 13	Tatung	1–2	Taichung Futuro	New Taipei
15:30 (UTC+8)	Chen Shih-hsien 4'; Wanyama (yellow card) 79'; Fahn (yellow card) 82'	Report	Mönkh-Orgil Orkhon 73'; Lai Yi-chiao 87'	Stadium: Fu Jen Catholic University; Attendance: 101; Referee: Chang Chih-chuan

8 March 2026 14	Tainan City TSG	2–3	Taichung Futuro	Taichung
15:30 (UTC+8)	Yao Ko-chi 33'; Porto 45+1' (pen.); Kuo Po-wei (yellow card) 61'; Gory (yellow card) 90+8'	Report	Chen Ting-yang 22'; Sakurauchi 28'; Liang Meng-hsin (yellow card) 47' (goal) 51'; Chen Hung-wei (yellow card) 60'; Cheng Hao (yellow card) 74'; Komori (yellow card) 75'; Matsui (red card) 85'	Stadium: Xitun Football Field; Attendance: 164; Referee: Yang Chang-pei

15 March 2026 7	Taichung Futuro	0–1	Tainan City TSG	Taichung
15:30 (UTC+8)	Ogawa (yellow card) 84'	Report	Gomez (yellow card) 44'; Wu Chun-ching 75'; Pan Wen-chieh (yellow card) 77'; Lin Ming-wei (yellow card) 84'; Fong Shao-chi (yellow card) 85'	Stadium: Taiyuan Football Field; Attendance: 103; Referee: Kuo Chan-yu

12 April 2026 15	Taichung Futuro	1–2	Sunny Bank AC Taipei	Tainan
15:30 (UTC+8)	Li Mao 90+7'	Report	Huang Wei-chieh 31', 63'; Chen Yu-lin (yellow card) 79'	Stadium: Tainan Municipal Football Field; Attendance: 80; Referee: Kuo Chan-yu

19 April 2026 16	Taichung Futuro	0–1	Taichung Rock	Taichung
18:30 (UTC+8)	Liang Meng-hsin (yellow card) 89'	Report	Lee Hung-chun (yellow card) 66'; Tseng Yun-hao 90'	Stadium: Xitun Football Field; Attendance: 203; Referee: Ko Chuan-yao

26 April 2026 17	New Taipei Hang Yuan	0–1	Taichung Futuro	New Taipei
15:30 (UTC+8)	Huang Yung-chun (yellow card) 20'	Report	Tsai Chieh-hsun (yellow card) 13' (yellow-red card) 57'; Cheng Hao 25'	Stadium: Fu Jen Catholic University; Attendance: 54; Referee: Yu Ming-hsun

3 May 2026 18	Taichung Futuro	4–0	Ming Chuan University	Taichung
19:00 (UTC+8)	Cheng Hao 5'; Yokoyama 50'; Lai Yi-chiao 79'; Saito 80'	Report	Li Po-yu (yellow card) 18'	Stadium: Xitun Football Field; Attendance: 164; Referee: Kuo Po-hung

10 May 2026 19	Taipower	1–2	Taichung Futuro	Kaohsiung
19:00 (UTC+8)	Chen Chao-an 54' (pen.)	Report	Saito 26'; Lai Yi-chiao 79'	Stadium: Kaohsiung Nanzih Football Stadium; Attendance: 352; Referee: Kuo Chan-yu

17 May 2026 20	Tatung	0–1	Taichung Futuro	New Taipei
16:00 (UTC+8)		Report	Yokoyama 78'	Stadium: Fu Jen Catholic University; Attendance: 100; Referee: Lin Te-en

24 May 2026 21	Tainan City TSG	2–1	Taichung Futuro	Tainan
19:00 (UTC+8)	Porto 23'; Wu Chun-ching 59'; Tsai Shuo-che (yellow card) 90+7'	Report	Yokoyama (yellow card) 48'; Saito 58'; Sakurauchi (yellow card) 74'	Stadium: Tainan Municipal Football Field; Attendance: 310; Referee: Kuo Chan-yu

=== Taiwan President FA Cup ===
==== Group stage ====
Pos	Team	Pld	W	D	L	GF	GA	GD	Pts	Qualification
1	Taichung Futuro	4	4	0	0	15	2	+13	12	Advanced to Quarterfinals
2	Tainan City TSG Green	4	3	0	1	18	5	+13	9	Advanced to Quarterfinals
3	Taichung Rock B	4	2	0	2	17	8	+9	6	
4	Ming Chuan B	4	0	1	3	2	15	−13	1	
5	Inter Taoyuan Grey	4	0	1	3	0	22	−22	1	

12 April 2025 1	Taichung Futuro	7−0	Inter Taoyuan Grey	Tainan
16:00 (UTC+8)	Lai Yi-chiao 3', 65', 73'; Li Mao 47', 76', 81'; Cheng Hao 51'	Recap		Stadium: Tainan Municipal Football Field

19 April 2025 2	Ming Chuan B	1−2	Taichung Futuro	Taoyuan
18:00 (UTC+8)	Hsiao Yueh-hui 41'; Chang Yi-hsien (yellow card) 53'	Recap	Li Mao 45+1', 59'	Stadium: Ming Chuan University

4 May 2025 3	Taichung Rock B	1−2	Taichung Futuro	Taichung
15:00 (UTC+8)	Hsu Liu Chien-feng (yellow card) 37'; Wang Yi-you (yellow card) 47'; Chiang Chun-yao 83'	Recap	Takayama 20' (pen.); Wen Chih-hao 89'	Stadium: Xitun Football Field

10 May 2025 4	Taichung Futuro	4−0	Tainan City TSG Green	Taichung
19:00 (UTC+8)	Hsu Heng-pin 17', 55', 63', 74'	Recap		Stadium: Xitun Football Field

==== Knockout stage ====
17 May 2025 Quarterfinals	Sunny Bank AC Taipei	0−4	Taichung Futuro	Taoyuan
13:00 (UTC+8)		Recap	Li Mao 50'; Lai Yi-chiao 56'; Takayama 71'; Hsu Heng-pin 90+5'	Stadium: National Taiwan Sport University; Referee: Chen Hsin-chuan

28 May 2025 Semifinals	Tainan City TSG Blue	5−0	Taichung Futuro	Taoyuan
16:00 (UTC+8)	Chen Jui-chieh 51', 74'; Benchy 67'; Yao Ko-chi 84'; Kim Sung-kyum 90+5'	Recap		Stadium: National Taiwan Sport University; Referee: Yu Ming-hsun

=== AFC Challenge League ===
==== Preliminary stage ====
12 August 2025 Preliminary stage	SP Falcons (Mongolia)	3–1	(Chinese Taipei) Taichung Futuro	Ulaanbaatar
16:00 (UTC+8)	Ayvazov 6', 89'; Sodmönkh 90+3'	Report	Li Mao (yellow card) 18'; Saito 59'	Stadium: MFF Football Centre; Attendance: 846; Referee: Abdullo Davlatov (Tajikistan)

== Statistics ==
=== Squad statistics ===
No.	Pos	Nat	Player	Total		TFPL		President FA Cup	
No.	Pos	Nat	Player	Apps	Goals	Apps	Goals	Apps	Goals
Goalkeepers
1	GK	(Chinese Taipei) TPE	Lee Ming-wei	0	0	0	0	0	0
21	GK	(Chinese Taipei) TPE	Tuan Yu	6	0	4	0	1+1	0
50	GK	(Japan) JPN	Kenya Matsui	21	0	16+1	0	4	0
99	GK	(Chinese Taipei) TPE	Lin Chun-hua	2	0	1	0	1	0
Defenders
3	DF	(Chinese Taipei) TPE	Chen Ting-yang	24	2	17+3	2	4	0
7	DF	(Japan) JPN	Keisuke Ogawa	8	0	5+1	0	0+2	0
8	DF	(Chinese Taipei) TPE	Yoshitaka Komori	3	0	0	0	0+3	0
15	DF	(Mongolia) MNG	Munkh-Orgil Orkhon	18	1	17+1	1	0	0
19	DF	(Chinese Taipei) TPE	Li Ya-she	14	0	4+4	0	6	0
34	DF	(Chinese Taipei) TPE	Lin Che-yu	7	0	0+5	0	0+2	0
42	DF	(Chinese Taipei) TPE	Liu Wei-che	25	0	11+8	0	2+4	0
43	DF	(Chinese Taipei) TPE	Liang Meng-hsin	25	1	15+4	1	6	0
88	DF	(Japan) JPN	Nagisa Sakurauchi	26	2	20	2	6	0
Midfielders
6	MF	(Chinese Taipei) TPE	Tsai Chieh-hsun	12	0	3+3	0	2+4	0
9	MF	(Chinese Taipei) TPE	Chen Hung-wei	26	2	17+3	2	6	0
10	MF	(Japan) JPN	Shohei Yokoyama	21	3	21	3	0	0
12	MF	(Chinese Taipei) TPE	Wen Chih-hao	12	2	6	1	6	1
16	MF	(Japan) JPN	Shoya Nagata	9	0	9	0	0	0
23	MF	(Japan) JPN	Kaoru Takayama	9	2	5	0	3+1	2
35	MF	(Japan) JPN	Ryota Saito	16	7	14+2	7	0	0
70/71 (Note: Worn number 71 in President FA Cup.)	MF	(Chinese Taipei) TPE	Peng Chuan-min	2	0	0+1	0	0+1	0
70/71 (Note: Worn number 70 in President FA Cup.)	MF	(Chinese Taipei) TPE	Yu Chia-le	0	0	0	0	0	0
72/77 (Note: Worn number 72 in President FA Cup.)	MF	(Chinese Taipei) TPE	Lai Yi-chiao	26	12	17+4	8	5	4
Forwards
4	FW	(Chinese Taipei) TPE	Tseng Te-lung	13	0	0+8	0	2+3	0
5	FW	(Chinese Taipei) TPE	Cheng Hao	20	4	6+9	3	5	1
17	FW	(Chinese Taipei) TPE	Hsu Heng-pin	18	6	5+8	1	2+3	5
18	FW	(Chinese Taipei) TPE	Li Mao	26	9	18+2	3	5+1	6
Players who left during the season but made an appearance
73	DF	(Chinese Taipei) TPE	Chen Hung-li	1	0	0	0	0+1	0
Own goals (0)

=== Goalscorers ===
Rank	No.	Pos.	Nat.	Player	TMFL	President FA Cup	Total
1	72/77 (Note: Worn number 72 in President FA Cup.)	MF	(Chinese Taipei)	Lai Yi-chiao	8	4	12
2	18	FW	(Chinese Taipei)	Li Mao	3	6	9
3	35	MF	(Japan)	Ryota Saito	7	—	7
4	17	FW	(Chinese Taipei)	Hsu Heng-pin	1	5	6
5	5	FW	(Chinese Taipei)	Cheng Hao	3	1	4
6	10	FW	(Japan)	Shohei Yokoyama	3	—	3
7	3	DF	(Chinese Taipei)	Chen Ting-yang	2	0	2
7	9	MF	(Chinese Taipei)	Chen Hung-wei	2	0	2
7	12	MF	(Chinese Taipei)	Wen Chih-hao	1	1	2
7	23	MF	(Japan)	Kaoru Takayama	0	2	2
7	88	DF	(Japan)	Nagisa Sakurauchi	2	0	2
12	15	DF	(Mongolia)	Munkh-Orgil Orkhon	1	—	1
12	43	DF	(Chinese Taipei)	Liang Meng-hsin	1	0	1
Totals					34	19	53

=== Hat-tricks ===
Player	Against	Result	Date	Competition	Ref
(Chinese Taipei) Lai Yi-chiao	Inter Taoyuan Grey	7–0	12 April 2025	Taiwan President FA Cup	
(Chinese Taipei) Li Mao	Inter Taoyuan Grey	7–0	12 April 2025	Taiwan President FA Cup	
(Chinese Taipei) Hsu Heng-pin^{4}	Tainan City TSG Green	4–0	10 May 2025	Taiwan President FA Cup	
(Chinese Taipei) Lai Yi-chiao	Tatung	5–0	26 October 2025	Taiwan Football Premier League	

^{4} – Player scored four goals.

=== Cleansheets ===
Rank	No.	Nat.	Player	TMFL	President FA Cup	Total
1	50	(Japan)	Kenya Matsui	5	2	7
2	21	(Chinese Taipei)	Tuan Yu	1	1	2
3	99	(Chinese Taipei)	Lin Chun-hua	0	1	1
4	1	(Chinese Taipei)	Lee Ming-wei	—	—	0
Totals				6	4	10

=== Disciplinary record ===
No.	Pos.	Nat.	Name	TFPL			President FA Cup			Total		
No.	Pos.	Nat.	Name	Booked	(yellow card) (yellow-red card)	Sent off (straight red)	Booked	(yellow card) (yellow-red card)	Sent off (straight red)	Booked	(yellow card) (yellow-red card)	Sent off (straight red)
88	DF	(Japan)	Nagisa Sakurauchi	5						5		
43	DF	(Chinese Taipei)	Liang Meng-hsin	3						3		
50	GK	(Japan)	Kenya Matsui	2		1				2		1
7	DF	(Japan)	Keisuke Ogawa	2						2		
8	DF	(Chinese Taipei)	Yoshitaka Komori	2						2		
15	DF	(Mongolia)	Munkh-Orgil Orkhon	2						2		
17	FW	(Chinese Taipei)	Hsu Heng-pin	2						2		
5	FW	(Chinese Taipei)	Cheng Hao	1						1		
9	DF	(Chinese Taipei)	Chen Hung-wei	1						1		
10	MF	(Japan)	Shohei Yokoyama	1						1		
12	MF	(Chinese Taipei)	Wen Chih-hao	1						1		
18	FW	(Chinese Taipei)	Li Mao	1						1		
34	DF	(Chinese Taipei)	Lin Che-yu	1						1		
72/77 (Note: Worn number 72 in President FA Cup.)	MF	(Chinese Taipei)	Lai Yi-chiao				1			1		
6	MF	(Chinese Taipei)	Tsai Chieh-hsun		1						1	
Head Coach		(Chinese Taipei)	Fang Ching-ren	2						2		
Totals				26	1	1	1			27	1	1

Ordered by (red card) , (second yellow card) and (yellow card)
(yellow card) = Number of bookings; (second yellow card) = Number of sending offs after a second yellow card; (red card) = Number of sending offs by a direct red card.
