= 2023 Taichung Futuro season =

Taichung Futuro
2023 season
- Owner: Yoshitaka Komori
- Head coach: ~~Juang Ming-yan (TFPL)~~; Jun Hirabayashi (TFPL); Pen Wu-sung (AFC Cup)
- TFPL: 5th
- AFC Cup: Inter-zone play-off semi-finals
- Top goalscorer: League: Jhon Benchy (9); All: Jhon Benchy (9)
- Biggest win: Ming Chuan University 0–6 Futuro
- Biggest defeat: Futuro 0–4 Taipower

The 2023 Taichung Futuro season was the club's 5th season and their 5th season in Taiwan Football Premier League. Taichung Futuro also participated in the AFC Cup as they were the 2022 Taiwan Football Premier League runner-up.

On 14 December 2023, Taichung Futuro advanced to the 2023–24 AFC Cup knockout stage in 2024, becoming the first Taiwanese team to clinch a spot in the AFC Cup knockout stage.

== Kits ==
- Supplier: MIE Jersey
- Main Sponsor: Changhua County Government (TFPL) / Hota-Gear (AFC Cup)

== Players ==
N	Pos.	Nat.	Name	Age.	Since
Goalkeepers
1	GK	(Chinese Taipei)	Lee Ming-wei	26	2020
21	GK	(Chinese Taipei)	Tuan Yu	29	2019
31	GK	(Chinese Taipei)	Tian Syuan-jin	25	2023
50	GK	(Japan)	Kenya Matsui	38	2023
51	GK	(Japan)	Taiki Itsukaichi	25	2023
Defenders
3	DF	(Chinese Taipei)	Chen Ting-yang (captain)	31	2019
4	DF	(Chinese Taipei)	Tseng Te-lung	21	2023
5	DF	(Chinese Taipei)	Cheng Hao	26	2022
7	DF	(Japan)	Keisuke Ogawa	37	2019
8	DF	(Chinese Taipei)	Yoshitaka Komori	36	2019
13	DF	(Japan)	Shunya Suganuma	33	2023
20/14 (Note: Worn number 20 in domestic league and number 14 in AFC Cup.)	DF	(Chinese Taipei)	Chen Chun-fu	22	2023
34	DF	(Chinese Taipei)	Lin Che-yu	30	2023
42	DF	(Chinese Taipei)	Juang Ming-yan	34	2023
Midfielders
6	MF	(Chinese Taipei)	Tsai Chieh-hsun	20	2023
9	MF	(Chinese Taipei)	Chen Hung-wei	26	2021
10	MF	(Japan)	Shohei Yokoyama	30	2021
14	MF	(Japan)	Naoki Kaneko	23	2023
15	MF	(Japan)	Kazuya Kojima	24	2023
18	MF	(Chinese Taipei)	Li Mao	31	2019
19	MF	(Japan)	Genki Takatera	28	2023
23	MF	(Japan)	Kaoru Takayama	35	2023
25	MF	(Japan)	Kakeru Gunji	22	2023
43	MF	(Chinese Taipei)	Liang Meng-hsin	20	2021
Forwards
11	FW	(Japan)	Amari Oki	23	2022
17	FW	(Chinese Taipei)	Hsu Heng-pin	30	2019
27	FW	(Chinese Taipei)	Fang Ching-ren	42	2023
33	FW	(Japan)	Kotaro Nakajima	25	2023
36	FW	(Chinese Taipei)	Carlo Finotti	17	2023
99	FW	(Haiti)	Jhon Benchy	29	2022

== Transfers ==
=== In ===
No.	Pos.	Player	Transferred from	Source
Preseason
4	DF	Tseng Te-lung	(Chinese Taipei) Land Home NTUS	
6	DF	So Narita	(Cambodia) Angkor Tiger	
14	DF	Naoki Kaneko	–	
15	MF	Kazuya Kojima	(Laos) Kheanlao United	
19	MF	Genki Takatera	–	
23	MF	Kaoru Takayama	(Japan) Sagamihara	
25	MF	Kakeru Gunji	(Croatia) Sloboda Mihovljan	
27	FW	Fang Ching-ren	–	
31	GK	Tian Syuan-jin	–	
33	FW	Kotaro Nakajima	(Germany) Sportfreunde 04	
34	DF	Lin Che-yu	–	
37	MF	Chang Yi-wei	–	
38	MF	Wan Hsien-Yi	–	
39	MF	Pai Chia-lun	–	
40	MF	Shao Shou-yue	–	
41	MF	Chao Yang-chun	–	
42	DF	Chao Yang-chen	–	
50	GK	Kenya Matsui	(Japan) Blaublitz Akita	
Midseason
6	MF	Tsai Chieh-hsun	–	
13	DF	Shunya Suganuma	–	
20	DF	Chen Chun-fu	(Chinese Taipei) Land Home NTUS	
36	FW	Carlo Finotti	–	
42	DF	Juang Ming-yan	–	
51	GK	Taiki Itsukaichi	(Germany) Niedernhausen	

=== Out ===
No.	Pos.	Player	Transferred to	Source
Preseason
1	GK	Pan Wen-chieh	(Chinese Taipei) Tainan City	
2	DF	Takeo Miyazaki	Retired	
4	DF	Wang Ruei	(Chinese Taipei) Tainan City	
6	MF	Tu Shao-chieh	(Chinese Taipei) Taipower	
10	FW	Chen Hao-wei	–	
11	MF	Wu Chun-ching	(Chinese Taipei) Tainan City	
13	MF	Koki Narita	(Thailand) Rajpracha	
19	MF	Seiji Fujiwara	Retired	
23	DF	Juang Ming-yan	–	
77	FW	Onur Dogan	(Chinese Taipei) Leopard Cat	
80	FW	Chen Sheng-wei	(Chinese Taipei) Leopard Cat	
81	GK	Jun Kochi	(Laos) Viengchanh	
Midseason
6	DF	So Narita	(Chinese Taipei) Tainan City	
20	MF	Matias Godoy	(Chinese Taipei) Vikings PlayOne	
35	FW	Takayuki Morimoto	–	
37	MF	Chang Yi-wei	–	
38	MF	Wan Hsien-Yi	–	
39	MF	Pai Chia-lun	–	
40	MF	Shao Shou-yue	–	
41	MF	Chao Yang-chun	–	
42	DF	Chao Yang-chen	–	

== Competitions ==
=== Overall record ===
Competition	First match	Last match	Starting round	Final position	Record							
Competition	First match	Last match	Starting round	Final position	Pld	W	D	L	GF	GA	GD	Win %
TFPL	16 April 2023	10 December 2023	Matchday 1	5th	21	8	4	9	33	31	+2	38.10
AFC Cup	23 August 2023	13 March 2024	Play-off round	Inter-zone semi-finals	7	5	0	2	10	9	+1	71.43
Total					28	13	4	11	43	40	+3	46.43

Last updated: 13 March 2024
Source: TFPL AFC Cup

=== Taiwan Football Premier League ===
==== League table ====
Pos	Team	Pld	W	D	L	GF	GA	GD	Pts	Qualification or relegation
1	Tainan City TSG (C)	21	17	1	3	47	14	+33	52	Qualification for the AFC Challenge League qualifying play-offs
2	Leopard Cat	21	12	5	4	40	22	+18	41	
3	Taipower	21	10	3	8	38	24	+14	33	
4	AC Taipei	21	9	4	8	25	19	+6	31	
5	Futuro	21	8	4	9	33	31	+2	28	
6	New Taipei Hang Yuen	21	8	3	10	25	33	−8	27	
7	Ming Chuan University	21	5	4	12	19	44	−25	19	Transfer to 2024 Taiwan Football Premier League qualifiers
8	Taipei Dragons (R)	21	2	2	17	18	58	−40	8	Relegation to Taiwan Second Division Football League

(C) Champions; (R) Relegated

==== Results by round ====
Round	1	2	3	4	5	6	7	8	9	10	11	12	13	14	15	16	17	18	19	20	21
Result	W	D	W	L	L	L	D	L	W	L	W	W	D	W	L	L	L	W	W	L	D
Position	1	2	1	1	3	3	4	5	7	5	7	4	3	3	4	6	6	5	4	5	5

Source: TFPL
W = Win; D = Draw; L = Loss

==== Matches ====
16 April 2023 1	Futuro	3–0	Leopard Cat	Kaohsiung
16:00 (UTC+8)	Benchy 53', 85'; Li Mao 81'; Takayama (yellow card) 89'; Yokoyama (yellow card) 90+3'	Report	Izumi (yellow card) 62'; Harada (yellow card) 83'; Dogan (yellow card) 89'; Yamazaki (yellow card) 90+3'	Stadium: Kaohsiung Nanzih Football Stadium; Attendance: 158; Referee: Liu Hsiang-shao

19 April 2023 2	Futuro	1–1	Taipower	Taoyuan
15:00 (UTC+8)	Lin Che-yu (yellow card) 78'; Yokoyama 83'	Report	Kao Wei-chieh 2'; Chao Ming-hsiu (yellow card) 11'; Chen Chao-an (yellow card) 50'	Stadium: Ming Chuan University; Attendance: 5 Referee: Yu Ming-hsun

23 April 2023 3	Futuro	1–0	Taipei Deva Dragons	Taichung
16:00 (UTC+8)	Benchy 55'	Report		Stadium: Taiyuan Football Field; Attendance: 250; Referee: Kuo Chan-yu

3 May 2023 5	Ming Chuan University	2–0	Futuro	Taoyuan
18:00 (UTC+8)	Wang Sheng-han 4'; Ma Liang-cheng (yellow card) 5'; Hsiung Yuan-kuan 45'; Hsu Yu-jen (yellow card) 84'	Report	Liang Meng-hsin (yellow card) 13'; Cheng Hao (yellow card) 71'; Narita (yellow card) 74'	Stadium: Ming Chuan University; Attendance: 74; Referee: Lee Tsung-ying

7 May 2023 6	Futuro	0–2	Tainan City TSG	Kaohsiung
19:00 (UTC+8)		Report	Kim Sung-kyum 44'; Lin Wei-chieh 81'	Stadium: Kaohsiung Nanzih Football Stadium; Attendance: 109; Referee: Kuo Po-hung

13 May 2023 7	AC Taipei	2–0	Futuro	Taoyuan
16:00 (UTC+8)	Huang Wei-chieh 45'; Oh Yong-myung (yellow card) 75'; Huang Sheng-chieh 86'	Report	Cheng Hao (yellow card) 77'	Stadium: Ming Chuan University; Attendance: 90; Referee: Yu Ming-hsun

9 July 2023 4	Futuro	3–1	New Taipei Hang Yuen	Kaohsiung
16:00 (UTC+8)	Benchy 22'; Lin Che-yu 79'; Oki 90+1'	Report	Chou Yu-chieh (yellow card) 47'; Liu Chih-wen (yellow card) 73'; Rabre (yellow card) 75'; Aveska 85'	Stadium: Kaohsiung Nanzih Football Stadium; Attendance: 51; Referee: Kuo Chan-yu

17 May 2023 8	Futuro	2–2	Leopard Cat	Taoyuan
15:00 (UTC+8)	Li Mao 45+2'; Ogawa (yellow card) 73'; Komori (yellow card) 90'; Morimoto 90+2'	Report	Chen Po-hao 59'; Yamazaki 75'	Stadium: Ming Chuan University; Attendance: 56; Referee: Hsu Min-yu

21 May 2023 9	Futuro	0–4	Taipower	Taichung
16:00 (UTC+8)		Report	Chen Po-yu 20', 35'; Lai Chih-hsuan 44'; Lin Chien-hsun (yellow card) 49'; Lin Cheng-yi (yellow card) 51' (yellow-red card) 90+2'; Hung Tzu-kuei (yellow card) 53'; Kao Wei-chieh (yellow card) 84', (goal) 90+6'	Stadium: Taiyuan Football Field; Attendance: 213; Referee: Kuo Chia-hao

28 May 2023 10	Futuro	6–2	Taipei Dragons	Taichung
16:00 (UTC+8)	Benchy 8', 81'; Takayama 31', 49'; Li Mao 53', (yellow card) 63'; Yokoyama 80'	Report	Huang Kuo-fu (yellow card) 46'; Shih Cheng-hsi 77'; Chao Wei-chieh (yellow card) 86'; Liu Chien-wei 89'	Stadium: Taiyuan Football Field; Attendance: 150; Referee: Kuo Chia-hao

31 May 2023 11	Futuro	0–1	New Taipei Hang Yuen	New Taipei
16:00 (UTC+8)		Report	Fang Li-peng (yellow card) 50'; Aveska (yellow card) 72'; Joo Ik-seong 82'	Stadium: Fu Jen Catholic University; Attendance: 35; Referee: Liu Hsiang-shao

4 June 2023 12	Ming Chuan University	0–6	Futuro	Taoyuan
18:00 (UTC+8)		Report	Cheng Hao (yellow card) 45'; Benchy 45+2'; Takayama 69'; Li Mao 75', 83', 90+4'; Godoy 90+3'	Stadium: Ming Chuan University; Attendance: 80; Referee: Lee Tsung-ying

28 June 2023 13	Tainan City TSG	0–2	Futuro	Kaohsiung
19:00 (UTC+8)	Lin Wei-chieh (yellow card) 69'	Report	Takayama 40'; Oki (yellow card) 59'; Yokoyama 63'; Hsu Heng-pin (yellow card) 80'	Stadium: National Stadium; Attendance: 42; Referee: Chen Hsin-chuan

2 July 2023 14	Futuro	1–1	AC Taipei	Taichung
16:00 (UTC+8)	Benchy 18'; Tseng Te-lung (yellow card) 35'; Li Mao (red card) 55'	Report	Ichiyanagi (yellow card) 21'; Lee Tsung-yang 58'; Chen Kai-wen (yellow card) 89'	Stadium: Taiyuan Football Field; Attendance: 210; Referee: Hsu Min-yu

29 October 2023 15	Futuro	0–3	Leopard Cat	Taichung
15:00 (UTC+8)		Report	Harada 15', 77'; Izumi 80'	Stadium: Taiyuan Football Field; Attendance: 138; Referee: Kuo Chan-yu

1 November 2023 16	Futuro	2–5	Taipower	Tainan
15:00 (UTC+8)	Benchy 43', (yellow card) 63'; Suganuma (yellow card) 57'; Tsai Chieh-hsun 84'	Report	Chiu Po-jui 2', (yellow card) 59'; Lee Hsiang-wei 41'; Ko Yu-ting 54', 66', 76'	Stadium: Tainan Municipal Football Field; Attendance: 30; Referee: Liu Hsiang-shao

5 November 2023 17	Taipei Dragons	2–1	Futuro	New Taipei
15:00 (UTC+8)	Tsai Cheng-ju 15', 82', (yellow card) 21'; Liu Chien-wei (yellow card) 67'; Lin Chun-kai (yellow card) 75'	Report	Liang Meng-hsin 2'	Stadium: Fu Jen Catholic University; Attendance: 45; Referee: Hsu Min-yu

26 November 2023 18	Futuro	2–0	New Taipei Hang Yuen	Taichung
15:00 (UTC+8)	Tsai Chieh-hsun 24'; Cheng Hao (yellow card) 51'; Finotti 76'	Report	Lin Tsung-hung (yellow card) 14'; Aveska (yellow card) 62'	Stadium: Taiyuan Football Field; Attendance: 92; Referee: Liu Hsiang-shao

3 December 2023 19	Futuro	1–0	Ming Chuan University	Kaohsiung
18:00 (UTC+8)	Finotti (yellow card) 1'; Hsu Heng-pin 54'	Report		Stadium: Kaohsiung Nanzih Football Stadium; Attendance: 53; Referee: Kuo Chan-yu

6 December 2023 20	Tainan City TSG	3–2	Futuro	Tainan
15:00 (UTC+8)	Moser 11'; Kouamé 21', 90+4'; Kuo Bo-wei (yellow card) 83'	Report	Cheng Hao 36'; Gunji 44'	Stadium: Tainan Municipal Football Field; Attendance: 99; Referee: Kuo Chia-hao

10 December 2023 21	AC Taipei	0–0	Futuro	New Taipei
15:00 (UTC+8)		Report	Ogawa (yellow card) 29'	Stadium: National Taipei University; Attendance: 210; Referee: Yu Ming-hsun

=== AFC Cup ===
==== Qualifying play-offs ====
23 August 2023 Play-off round	Monte Carlo (Macau)	1–2	(Chinese Taipei) Taichung Futuro	Taipa
19:30 (UTC+8)	Renato (yellow card) 45+3'; Jackson 77'	Report	Liang Meng-hsin 7'; Takayama 16'; Cheng Hao (yellow card) 52'; Chen Chun-fu (yellow card) 69'	Stadium: Estádio Campo Desportivo; Attendance: 1,238; Referee: Tejas Nagvenkar (India)

==== Group stage ====
Pos	Team	Pld	W	D	L	GF	GA	GD	Pts	Qualification	FUT	ULA	TAI	CPK
1	(Chinese Taipei) Taichung Futuro	6	4	0	2	8	8	0	12 (Note: Ranked on head-to-head goal difference: Taichung Futuro +1, Ulaanbaatar –1)	Inter-zone play-off semi-finals	—	1–2	2–1	1–0
2	(Mongolia) Ulaanbaatar	6	4	0	2	7	7	0	12		0–2	—	3–1	1–0
3	(Chinese Taipei) Taiwan Steel	6	3	0	3	15	12	+3	9		5–1	3–0	—	4–2
4	(Macau) Chao Pak Kei	6	1	0	5	6	9	−3	3		0–1	0–1	4–1	—

Source: AFC
Rules for classification: Group stage tiebreakers
Notes:

21 September 2023 1	Chao Pak Kei (Macau)	0–1	(Chinese Taipei) Taichung Futuro	Taipa
18:00 (UTC+8)	Wan Tin Iao (yellow card) 39'; Lam Ka Seng (yellow card) 42'	Report	Duarte 2' (o.g.)	Stadium: Estádio Campo Desportivo; Attendance: 1,002; Referee: Sultan Mohamed (United Arab Emirates)

5 October 2023 2	Ulaanbaatar (Mongolia)	0–2	(Chinese Taipei) Taichung Futuro	Ulaanbaatar
16:00 (UTC+8)	Altansukh (yellow card) 34'	Report	Yokoyama 9'; Matsui (yellow card) 72'; Hsu Heng-pin 79', (yellow card) 89'; Ogawa (yellow card) 83'	Stadium: MFF Football Centre; Attendance: 919; Referee: Ahmad A'Qashah (Singapore)

26 October 2023 3	Taichung Futuro (Chinese Taipei)	2–1	(Chinese Taipei) Taiwan Steel	Kaohsiung
18:00 (UTC+8)	Suganuma (yellow card) 32', (goal) 90+5'; Hsu Heng-pin 73'	Report	Fong Shao-chi (yellow card) 51'; Kouamé (yellow card) 53'; Zumakulov (yellow card) 54'; Moser 61' (pen.); Lin Kai-en (yellow card) 88'	Stadium: National Stadium; Attendance: 126; Referee: Razlan Joffri Ali (Malaysia)

9 November 2023 4	Taiwan Steel (Chinese Taipei)	5–1	(Chinese Taipei) Taichung Futuro	Kaohsiung
: (UTC+8)	Wu Chun-ching 22'; Kouamé 25' (pen.), 81', 89'; Chen Wei-chuan (yellow card) 50'; Yu Chia-huang 69'	Report	Li Mao (yellow card) 24'; Takayama 51' (pen.)	Stadium: Kaohsiung Nanzih Football Stadium; Attendance: 352; Referee: Razlan Joffri Ali (Malaysia)

30 November 2023 5	Taichung Futuro (Chinese Taipei)	1–0	(Macau) Chao Pak Kei	Kaohsiung
13:00 (UTC+8)	Li Mao (yellow card) 60'; Takayama 90+1', (yellow card) 90+6'	Report	Kato (yellow card) 60'; Ng Wa Keng (yellow card) 86'	Stadium: Kaohsiung Nanzih Football Stadium; Attendance: 41; Referee: Seyed Vahid Kazemi (Iran)

14 December 2023 6	Taichung Futuro (Chinese Taipei)	1–2	(Mongolia) Ulaanbaatar	Kaohsiung
16:00 (UTC+8)	Suganuma (yellow card) 43'; Hsu Heng-pin 71'; Li Mao (yellow card) 90+2'	Report	Oyunbaatar (yellow card) 22'; Gantuya 31', (yellow card) 40'; Daginaa (yellow card) 38'; Krusevac 39'; Gerelt-Od (yellow card) 86'	Stadium: Kaohsiung Nanzih Football Stadium; Attendance: 96; Referee: Al Majarafi Mahmood Salim Said (Oman)

== Statistics ==
=== Squad statistics ===
No.	Pos	Nat	Player	Total		TMFL		AFC Cup (Note: Qualifying-playoff stats were excluded.)	
No.	Pos	Nat	Player	Apps	Goals	Apps	Goals	Apps	Goals
Goalkeepers
1	GK	(Chinese Taipei) TPE	Lee Ming-wei	1	0	0+1	0	0	0
21	GK	(Chinese Taipei) TPE	Tuan Yu	12	0	9+3	0	0	0
31	GK	(Chinese Taipei) TPE	Tian Syuan-jin	0	0	0	0	0	0
50	GK	(Japan) JPN	Kenya Matsui	18	0	11+1	0	6	0
51	GK	(Japan) JPN	Taiki Itsukaichi	1	0	1	0	0	0
Defenders
3	DF	(Chinese Taipei) TPE	Chen Ting-yang	20	0	12+2	0	6	0
4	DF	(Chinese Taipei) TPE	Tseng Te-lung	17	0	7+9	0	0+1	0
5	DF	(Chinese Taipei) TPE	Cheng Hao	25	1	17+2	1	1+5	0
7	DF	(Japan) JPN	Keisuke Ogawa	22	0	14+3	0	5	0
8	DF	(Chinese Taipei) TPE	Yoshitaka Komori	24	0	15+3	0	6	0
13	DF	(Japan) JPN	Shunya Suganuma	10	1	4	0	6	1
20/14 (Note: Worn number 20 in domestic league and number 14 in AFC Cup.)	DF	(Chinese Taipei) TPE	Chen Chun-fu	13	0	7	0	0+6	0
34	DF	(Chinese Taipei) TPE	Lin Che-yu	26	1	10+10	1	3+3	0
42	DF	(Chinese Taipei) TPE	Juang Ming-yan	0	0	0	0	0	0
Midfielders
6	MF	(Chinese Taipei) TPE	Tsai Chieh-hsun	7	2	5+1	2	0+1	0
9	MF	(Chinese Taipei) TPE	Chen Hung-wei	14	0	4+10	0	0	0
10	MF	(Japan) JPN	Shohei Yokoyama	23	4	15+2	3	6	1
14	MF	(Japan) JPN	Naoki Kaneko	5	0	4+1	0	0	0
15	MF	(Japan) JPN	Kazuya Kojima	4	0	2+2	0	0	0
18	MF	(Chinese Taipei) TPE	Li Mao	24	6	16+2	6	6	0
19	MF	(Japan) JPN	Genki Takatera	0	0	0	0	0	0
23	MF	(Japan) JPN	Kaoru Takayama	24	6	14+4	4	6	2
25	MF	(Japan) JPN	Kakeru Gunji	6	1	5+1	1	0	0
43	MF	(Chinese Taipei) TPE	Liang Meng-hsin	24	1	16+3	1	5	0
Forwards
11	FW	(Japan) JPN	Amari Oki	7	1	4+3	1	0	0
17	FW	(Chinese Taipei) TPE	Hsu Heng-pin	18	4	7+5	1	6	3
27	FW	(Chinese Taipei) TPE	Fang Ching-ren	2	0	0+2	0	0	0
33	FW	(Japan) JPN	Kotaro Nakajima	4	0	3+1	0	0	0
36	FW	(Chinese Taipei) TPE	Carlo Finotti	6	1	4+2	1	0	0
99	FW	(Haiti) HAI	Jhon Benchy	18	9	13	9	4+1	0
Players who left during the season but made an appearance
6	DF	(Japan) JPN	So Narita	8	0	7+1	0	0	0
20	MF	(Chile) CHI	Matias Godoy	4	1	1+3	1	0	0
35	FW	(Japan) JPN	Takayuki Morimoto	9	1	4+5	1	0	0
Own goals (0)

=== Goalscorers ===
Rank	No.	Pos.	Nat.	Player	TMFL	AFC Cup (Note: Qualifying-playoff stats were excluded.)	Total
1	99	FW	(Haiti)	Jhon Benchy	9	—	9
2	18	MF	(Chinese Taipei)	Li Mao	6	—	6
2	23	MF	(Japan)	Kaoru Takayama	4	2	6
4	10	MF	(Japan)	Shohei Yokoyama	3	1	4
4	17	FW	(Chinese Taipei)	Hsu Heng-pin	1	3	4
6	6	MF	(Chinese Taipei)	Tsai Chieh-hsun	2	—	2
7	5	DF	(Chinese Taipei)	Cheng Hao	1	—	1
7	11	FW	(Japan)	Amari Oki	1	—	1
7	20	MF	(Chile)	Matias Godoy	1	—	1
7	25	MF	(Japan)	Kakeru Gunji	1	—	1
7	34	DF	(Chinese Taipei)	Lin Che-yu	1	—	1
7	35	FW	(Japan)	Takayuki Morimoto	1	—	1
7	36	FW	(Chinese Taipei)	Carlo Finotti	1	—	1
7	43	FW	(Chinese Taipei)	Liang Meng-hsin	1	—	1
7	13	DF	(Japan)	Shunya Suganuma	—	1	1
Own goals (from the opponents)					—	1	1
Totals					33	8	41

=== Hat-tricks ===
Player	Against	Result	Date	Competition	Ref
(Chinese Taipei) Li Mao	Ming Chuan University	6–0	4 June 2023	Taiwan Football Premier League	

=== Cleansheets ===
Rank	No.	Nat.	Player	TFPL	AFC Cup	Total
1	50	(Japan)	Kenya Matsui	4	3	7
2	21	(Chinese Taipei)	Tuan Yu	6	—	6
3	1	(Chinese Taipei)	Lee Ming-wei	1	—	1
4	51	(Japan)	Taiki Itsukaichi	0	—	0
4	31	(Chinese Taipei)	Tian Syuan-jin	—	—	0
Totals				11	3	14

=== Disciplinary record ===
No.	Pos.	Nat.	Name	TFPL			AFC Cup (Note: Qualifying-playoff stats were excluded.)			Total		
No.	Pos.	Nat.	Name	Booked	(yellow card) (yellow-red card)	Sent off (straight red)	Booked	(yellow card) (yellow-red card)	Sent off (straight red)	Booked	(yellow card) (yellow-red card)	Sent off (straight red)
18	MF	(Chinese Taipei)	Li Mao	1		1	3			4		1
5	DF	(Chinese Taipei)	Cheng Hao	4						4		
7	DF	(Japan)	Keisuke Ogawa	2			1			3		
13	DF	(Japan)	Shunya Suganuma	1			2			3		
17	FW	(Chinese Taipei)	Hsu Heng-pin	1			1			2		
23	MF	(Japan)	Kaoru Takayama	1			1			2		
4	DF	(Chinese Taipei)	Tseng Te-lung	1						1		
6	DF	(Japan)	So Narita	1						1		
8	DF	(Chinese Taipei)	Yoshitaka Komori	1						1		
10	MF	(Japan)	Shohei Yokoyama	1						1		
11	FW	(Japan)	Amari Oki	1						1		
34	DF	(Chinese Taipei)	Lin Che-yu	1						1		
36	FW	(Chinese Taipei)	Carlo Finotti	1						1		
43	MF	(Chinese Taipei)	Liang Meng-hsin	1						1		
99	FW	(Haiti)	Jhon Benchy	1						1		
50	GK	(Japan)	Kenya Matsui				1			1		
Coach		(Chinese Taipei)	Juang Ming-yan	1						1		
Staff		(Japan)	Yuto Kabasawa	1						1		
Totals				21		1	9			30		1

Ordered by (red card) , (second yellow card) and (yellow card)
(yellow card) = Number of bookings; (second yellow card) = Number of sending offs after a second yellow card; (red card) = Number of sending offs by a direct red card.
