= 2026–27 Taichung Futuro season =

Taichung Futuro
2026–27 season
- Owner: Yoshitaka Komori
- Head coach: Fang Ching-ren
- Main grounds: Xitun Football Field
- Top goalscorer: League: Lee Han-hee (2); All: Lee Han-hee (2)
- Biggest win: Taichung Rock 0–2 Taichung Futuro
- Biggest defeat: Taichung Futuro 0–3 Tainan City TSG
Home colours	Away colours

The 2026–27 Taichung Futuro season is the club's 8th season and their 8th season in Taiwan Football Premier League.

== Kits ==
- Supplier: Joma
- Main Sponsor:Taichung City Government

== Management team ==
Position	Name
Head coach	(Chinese Taipei) Fang Ching-ren
Assistant coach	(Chinese Taipei) Li Yan-ting

- Last updated: 11 October 2026

== Players ==
N	Pos.	Nat.	Name	Age.	Since
Goalkeepers
1	GK	(Chinese Taipei)	Lee Ming-wei	29	2020
21	GK	(Chinese Taipei)	Tuan Yu	32	2019
22	GK	(United States)	Edison Castro	26	2026
50	GK	(Japan)	Kenya Matsui	41	2023
Defenders
2	DF	(Japan)	Oki Sakimoto	19	2026
3	DF	(Chinese Taipei)	Chen Ting-yang (captain)	34	2019
6	DF	(Chinese Taipei)	Tsai Chieh-hsun	23	2023
7	DF	(Japan)	Keisuke Ogawa	40	2019
8	DF	(Chinese Taipei)	Yoshitaka Komori	40	2019
9	DF	(Chinese Taipei)	Chen Hung-wei	29	2021
19	DF	(Chinese Taipei)	Li Ya-she	26	2026
43	DF	(Chinese Taipei)	Liang Meng-hsin	23	2021
88	DF	(Chinese Taipei)	Tseng Sai-te		2026
Midfielders
10	MF	(Japan)	Ren Nishimura	21	2026
12	MF	(Chinese Taipei)	Wen Chih-hao	33	2024
20	MF	(Chinese Taipei)	Su Ming-chiang	22	2026
23	MF	(Japan)	Kaoru Takayama	38	2023
34	MF	(Chinese Taipei)	Lin Che-yu	33	2023
42	MF	(Chinese Taipei)	Liu Wei-che	23	2024
77	MF	(Chinese Taipei)	Lai Yi-chiao	19	2025
95	MF	(Chinese Taipei)	Chang Heng	20	2026
96	MF	(Chinese Taipei)	Wu Po-jui		2026
99	MF	(Chinese Taipei)	Lin Chun-chieh		2026
Forwards
4	FW	(Chinese Taipei)	Tseng Te-lung	24	2026
5	FW	(Chinese Taipei)	Cheng Hao	29	2022
11	FW	(South Korea)	Lee Han-hee	19	2026
13	FW	(Japan)	Ryota Saito	24	2026
17	FW	(Chinese Taipei)	Hsu Heng-pin	33	2019
18	FW	(Chinese Taipei)	Li Mao	34	2019

== Transfers ==
=== In ===
No.	Pos.	Player	Transferred from	Source
Preseason
4	FW	Tseng Te-lung	(Chinese Taipei) Taichung Futuro Reserves	
19	DF	Li Ya-she	(Chinese Taipei) Taichung Futuro Reserves	
20	MF	Su Ming-chiang	(Chinese Taipei) MCU Desafio	
22	GK	Edison Castro	(Chinese Taipei) Taichung Futuro Reserves	
88	DF	Tseng Sai-te	(Chinese Taipei) Taichung Futuro Reserves	
95	MF	Chang Heng	(Chinese Taipei) Taichung Rock	
96	MF	Wu Po-jui	(Chinese Taipei) Taichung Futuro Reserves	
99	MF	Lin Chun-chieh	(Chinese Taipei) Taichung Futuro Reserves	

=== Out ===
No.	Pos.	Player	Transferred to	Fee	Source
Preseason
4	FW	Tseng Te-lung	(Chinese Taipei) Taichung Futuro Reserves		
10	MF	Shohei Yokoyama	–		
15	DF	Munkh-Orgil Orkhon	(Mongolia) Central Stallions		
16	MF	Shoya Nagata	(Mongolia) Central Stallions		
19	DF	Li Ya-she	(Chinese Taipei) Taichung Futuro Reserves		
35	MF	Ryota Saito	(Japan) V-Varen Nagasaki	Loan return	
70	MF	Peng Chuan-min	(Chinese Taipei) Taichung Futuro Reserves		
71	MF	Yu Chia-le	–		
88	DF	Nagisa Sakurauchi	(Chinese Taipei) New Taipei Hang Yuan		
99	GK	Lin Chun-hua	(Chinese Taipei) Taichung Rock		

=== Loans in ===
No.	Pos.	Player	Loaned from	On loan until	Source
Preseason
2	DF	Oki Sakimoto	(Japan) Osaka	31 December 2026	
10	MF	Ren Nishimura	(Japan) V-Varen Nagasaki	31 January 2027	
11	FW	Lee Han-hee	(Japan) Osaka	31 December 2026	
13	MF	Ryota Saito	(Japan) V-Varen Nagasaki	31 May 2027	

== Preseason and friendlies ==
27 August 2026 Taichung Community Shield	Taichung Rock	2–0	Taichung Futuro	Taichung
18:00 (UTC+8)				Stadium: Xitun Football Field

== Competitions ==
=== Overall record ===
Competition	First match	Last match	Starting round	Final position	Record							
Competition	First match	Last match	Starting round	Final position	Pld	W	D	L	GF	GA	GD	Win %
TFPL	13 September 2026	2 May 2027	Matchday 1	–	7	2	1	4	4	9	−5	28.57
Total					7	2	1	4	4	9	−5	28.57

=== Taiwan Football Premier League ===
==== League table ====
Pos	Team	Pld	W	D	L	GF	GA	GD	Pts	Qualification or relegation
1	Kaohsiung Attackers	6	4	2	0	14	5	+9	14	Qualification for the AFC Challenge League preliminary stage
2	Tatung Taiwan Leopard Cat	7	2	5	0	10	6	+4	11	
3	New Taipei Hang Yuan	5	2	3	0	6	2	+4	9	
4	Sunny Bank AC Taipei	6	2	2	2	7	6	+1	8	
5	Tainan City TSG	5	2	2	1	6	4	+2	8	
6	Taichung Futuro	7	2	1	4	4	9	−5	7	
7	Taipower	6	2	1	3	8	10	−2	7	
8	Taichung Rock	6	0	0	6	5	18	−13	0	

Updated to match(es) played on 22 November 2026. Source:
Rules for classification: 1) Points; 2) Head-to-head points; 3) Head-to-head goal difference; 4) Head-to-head goals scored; 5) Overall goal difference; 6) Overall goals scored; 7) Fewer disciplinary points; 8) Draw lots

==== Results by round ====
Round	1	2	3	4	5	6	7	8	9	10	11	12	13	14	15	16	17	18	19	20	21
Result	L	L	W	D	W	L	L														
Position	6	7	6	5	3	4	6														

W = Win; D = Draw; L = Loss

==== Matches ====
13 September 2026 1	Taichung Futuro	0–1	Tatung Taiwan Leopard Cat	Taichung
19:00 (UTC+8)		Report	Izumi 9'	Stadium: Xitun Football Field; Referee: Yang Chang-pei

20 September 2026 2	Taichung Futuro	0–2	Kaohsiung Attackers	Taichung
19:30 (UTC+8)	Chang Heng (yellow card) 62'; Lee Han-hee (yellow card) 69'; Wen Chih-hao (red card) 86'	Report	Hama 20'; Ruiz (yellow card) 65'; Tateiwa (yellow card) 86'; Huang Chao-chung 90+7'	Stadium: Xitun Football Field; Referee: Ko Chuan-yao

11 October 2026 3	Taipower	0–1	Taichung Futuro	Kaohsiung
15:30 (UTC+8)	Chao Ming-hsiu (yellow card) 80'	Report	Lai Yi-chiao 64'	Stadium: Kaohsiung Nanzih Football Stadium; Referee: Kuo Chan-yu

18 October 2026 4	Taichung Futuro	1–1	Sunny Bank AC Taipei	Taichung
16:00 (UTC+8)	Chang Heng 35'; Matsui (yellow card) 55'	Report	Tuan Hsuan (yellow card) 22'; Chen Yu-lin (yellow card) 48'; Godoy 61'; Chen Yen-jui (yellow card) FT	Stadium: Taiyuan Football Field; Referee: Liu Hsiang-shao

25 October 2026 5	Taichung Rock	0–2	Taichung Futuro	Taichung
19:00 (UTC+8)	Lee Yu-lin (red card) 64'	Report	Lee Han-hee 6', 41'	Stadium: Xitun Football Field; Referee: Ko Chuan-yao

1 November 2026 6	Tainan City TSG	3–0	Taichung Futuro	Tainan
18:30 (UTC+8)	Chen Yi-hsuan (yellow card) 50'; Wilker 59'; Fong Shao-chi 61'; Porto 80'	Report		Stadium: Tainan Municipal Football Field; Referee: Liu Hsiang-shao

22 November 2026 7	Taichung Futuro	0–2	New Taipei Hang Yuan	Taichung
15:00 (UTC+8)			Huang Yung-chun 4'; Koreeda 13'	Stadium: Taiyuan Football Field; Referee: Ko Chuan-yao

29 November 2026 8	Taichung Futuro	v	Tatung Taiwan Leopard Cat	Taichung
16:00 (UTC+8)				Stadium: Xitun Football Field

6 December 2026 9	Kaohsiung Attackers	v	Taichung Futuro	Kaohsiung
19:00 (UTC+8)				Stadium: Kaohsiung Nanzih Football Stadium

13 December 2026 10	Taichung Futuro	v	Taipower	Taichung
16:00 (UTC+8)				Stadium: Taichung Football Sports and Leisure Park Training Pitch

24 January 2027 11	Taichung Futuro	v	Sunny Bank AC Taipei	Taichung
19:00 (UTC+8)				Stadium: Xitun Football Field

31 January 2027 12	Taichung Futuro	v	Taichung Rock	Taichung
19:00 (UTC+8)				Stadium: Xitun Football Field

21 February 2027 13	Taichung Futuro	v	Tainan City TSG	Taichung
16:00 (UTC+8)				Stadium: Xitun Football Field

28 February 2027 14	New Taipei Hang Yuan	v	Taichung Futuro	New Taipei
19:00 (UTC+8)				Stadium: Fu Jen Catholic University

7 March 2027 15	Taiwan Leopard Cat	v	Taichung Futuro	New Taipei
16:00 (UTC+8)				Stadium: Fu Jen Catholic University

14 March 2027 16	Taichung Futuro	v	Kaohsiung Attackers	Taichung
19:00 (UTC+8)				Stadium: Xitun Football Field

21 March 2027 17	Taipower	v	Taichung Futuro	Kaohsiung
19:00 (UTC+8)				Stadium: Kaohsiung Nanzih Football Stadium

11 April 2027 18	Sunny Bank AC Taipei	v	Taichung Futuro	New Taipei
15:00 (UTC+8)				Stadium: Xizhi Sports Field

18 April 2027 19	Taichung Rock	v	Taichung Futuro	Taichung
19:00 (UTC+8)				Stadium: Xitun Football Field

25 April 2027 20	Tainan City TSG	v	Taichung Futuro	Tainan
18:30 (UTC+8)				Stadium: Tainan Municipal Football Field

2 May 2027 21	Taichung Futuro	v	New Taipei Hang Yuan	Taichung
19:30 (UTC+8)				Stadium: Xitun Football Field

== Statistics ==
=== Squad statistics ===
No.	Pos	Nat	Player	Total		TFPL	
No.	Pos	Nat	Player	Apps	Goals	Apps	Goals
Goalkeepers
1	GK	(Chinese Taipei) TPE	Lee Ming-wei	0	0	0	0
21	GK	(Chinese Taipei) TPE	Tuan Yu	0	0	0	0
22	GK	(United States) USA	Edison Castro	0	0	0	0
50	GK	(Japan) JPN	Kenya Matsui	7	0	7	0
Defenders
2	DF	(Japan) JPN	Oki Sakimoto	7	0	7	0
3	DF	(Chinese Taipei) TPE	Chen Ting-yang	6	0	6	0
6	DF	(Chinese Taipei) TPE	Tsai Chieh-hsun	3	0	2+1	0
7	DF	(Japan) JPN	Keisuke Ogawa	1	0	0+1	0
8	DF	(Chinese Taipei) TPE	Yoshitaka Komori	0	0	0	0
9	DF	(Chinese Taipei) TPE	Chen Hung-wei	7	0	1+6	0
19	DF	(Chinese Taipei) TPE	Li Ya-she	7	0	5+2	0
43	DF	(Chinese Taipei) TPE	Liang Meng-hsin	7	0	7	0
88	DF	(Chinese Taipei) TPE	Tseng Sai-te	0	0	0	0
Midfielders
10	MF	(Japan) JPN	Ren Nishimura	4	0	3+1	0
12	MF	(Chinese Taipei) TPE	Wen Chih-hao	6	0	6	0
20	MF	(Chinese Taipei) TPE	Su Ming-chiang	1	0	0+1	0
23	MF	(Japan) JPN	Kaoru Takayama	4	0	1+3	0
34	MF	(Chinese Taipei) TPE	Lin Che-yu	6	0	0+6	0
42	MF	(Chinese Taipei) TPE	Liu Wei-che	1	0	0+1	0
77	MF	(Chinese Taipei) TPE	Lai Yi-chiao	7	1	7	1
95	MF	(Chinese Taipei) TPE	Chang Heng	7	1	4+3	1
96	MF	(Chinese Taipei) TPE	Wu Po-jui	1	0	0+1	0
99	MF	(Chinese Taipei) TPE	Lin Chun-chieh	0	0	0	0
Forwards
4	FW	(Chinese Taipei) TPE	Tseng Te-lung	0	0	0	0
5	FW	(Chinese Taipei) TPE	Cheng Hao	6	0	1+5	0
11	FW	(South Korea) KOR	Lee Han-hee	7	2	6+1	2
13	FW	(Japan) JPN	Ryota Saito	7	0	7	0
17	FW	(Chinese Taipei) TPE	Hsu Heng-pin	0	0	0	0
18	FW	(Chinese Taipei) TPE	Li Mao	7	0	7	0
Own goals (0)

=== Goalscorers ===
Rank	No.	Pos.	Nat.	Player	TMFL	Total
1	11	FW	(South Korea)	Lee Han-hee	2	2
2	77	MF	(Chinese Taipei)	Lai Yi-chiao	1	1
2	95	MF	(Chinese Taipei)	Chang Heng	1	1
Totals					4	4

=== Cleansheets ===
Rank	No.	Nat.	Player	TMFL	Total
1	50	(Japan)	Kenya Matsui	2	2
2	1	(Chinese Taipei)	Lee Ming-wei	—	0
2	21	(Chinese Taipei)	Tuan Yu	—	0
2	22	(United States)	Edison Castro	—	0
Totals				2	2

=== Disciplinary record ===
No.	Pos.	Nat.	Name	TFPL			Total		
No.	Pos.	Nat.	Name	Yellow card	(yellow card) (yellow-red card)	Red card	Yellow card	(yellow card) (yellow-red card)	Red card
12	MF	(Chinese Taipei)	Wen Chih-hao			1			1
11	FW	(South Korea)	Lee Han-hee	1			1		
50	GK	(Japan)	Kenya Matsui	1			1		
95	MF	(Chinese Taipei)	Chang Heng	1			1		
Head Coach		(Chinese Taipei)	Fang Ching-ren		1			1	
Totals				3	1	1	3	1	1

Ordered by (red card) , (second yellow card) and (yellow card)
(yellow card) = Number of bookings; (second yellow card) = Number of sending offs after a second yellow card; (red card) = Number of sending offs by a direct red card.
