= 2024 Taiwan Football Premier League =

Taiwan Football Premier League
- Season: 2024
- Dates: 14 April – 8 December
- Champions: Tainan City TSG
- Relegated: FC Vikings
- Challenge League: Tainan City TSG; Futuro
- Matches: 60
- Goals: 183 (3.05 per match)
- Top goalscorer: Li Mao (9 goals)
- Biggest home win: Sunny Bank AC Taipei 5–0 Ming Chuan University (30 June 2024)
- Biggest away win: FC Vikings 1–6 Futuro (4 August 2024); Leopard Cat 0–5 Tainan City TSG (14 September 2024)
- Highest scoring: FC Vikings 1–6 Futuro (4 August 2024)
- Longest winning run: Futuro; Tainan City TSG (6 matches)
- Longest unbeaten run: Futuro; Tainan City TSG (11 matches)
- Longest winless run: FC Vikings (15 matches)
- Longest losing run: FC Vikings (7 matches)
- Highest attendance: 667; Leopard Cat 2–0 AC Taipei (5 May 2024)
- Lowest attendance: 78; New Taipei Hang Yuen 1–1 Ming Chuan University (23 June 2024)
- All statistics correct as of 26 August 2024.

The 2024 Taiwan Football Premier League was the eighth season of the Taiwan Football Premier League, the top-flight association football competition in Taiwan under its current format. The season began on 14 April and finished on 8 December 2024.

== Teams ==
=== Promotions and relegations ===
There are 8 teams in the league, including 7 teams from the 2023 season and 1 team promoted from the 2023 second division.

==== Teams relegated to the second division ====
Taipei Dragons was the only team relegated after finishing last place in the previous season, ending their one year stay in the top tier. Taipei Dragons was renamed to Taipei Elite SC in 2024.

==== Teams promoted from the second division ====
Vikings–PlayOne, the champions of the second division in 2023 earned automatic promotion and was the only team promoted after Inter Taoyuan had lost 2–3 to Ming Chuan University in the promotion/relegation playoffs.

Promoted from 2023 second division	Relegated from 2023 TFPL
Vikings–PlayOne	Taipei Dragons

=== Teams and locations ===
Team	Chinese	Based in	Seasons in TFPL	First season in TFPL
Futuro	Futuro	Taichung City	6	2019
Leopard Cat	臺灣石虎	Taipei City	8	2017
Ming Chuan University	銘傳大學	Taoyuan City	6	2017
New Taipei Hang Yuen	新北航源	New Taipei City	8	2017
Sunny Bank AC Taipei	陽信北競	Taipei City	3	2022
Tainan City TSG	南市台鋼	Tainan City	8	2017
FC Vikings	臺北維京人	Taipei City	1	2024
Taipower	台灣電力	Kaohsiung City	8	2017

=== Venues ===
Taiwan Football Premier League teams currently don't play all their home games in a specific home ground. Some venues may hold more than one different matchups in a single matchday.

Location of venues in 2024 Taiwan Football Premier League

Stadium	Chinese	Location	Capacity
Fu Jen Catholic University Stadium	輔仁大學足球場	New Taipei City	3,000
Kaohsiung Nanzih Football Stadium	高雄市立楠梓足球場	Kaohsiung City	1,200
Ming Chuan University Taoyuan Campus	銘傳大學龜山校區	Taoyuan City	5,000
National Taipei University	國立臺北大學	New Taipei City	300
Tainan Municipal Football Field	臺南市立足球場	Tainan City	2,000
Taipei Municipal Stadium	臺北田徑場	Taipei City	20,000
Taiyuan Football Field	太原足球場	Taichung City	600
Yilan Sports Park Multipurpose Stadium	宜蘭運動公園複合式運動場	Yilan County	15,000

=== Foreign players ===
Club	Player 1	Player 2	Player 3	Player 4	Player 5	Player 6	Player 7	Player 8	Former Player
Futuro	(Japan) Kenya Matsui	(Japan) Keisuke Ogawa	(Japan) Nagisa Sakurauchi	(Japan) Toshio Shimakawa	(Japan) Kaoru Takayama	(Japan) Takuro Uehara	(Japan) Koji Wada	(Japan) Shohei Yokoyama	
Leopard Cat FC	(Honduras) Elias Argueta	(Brazil) Garrydo	(Japan) Taiyo Izumi	(Kenya) Nichodemus Malika	(Philippines) Nathan Rilloraza	(Japan) Naoyuki Yamazaki			
Ming Chuan University	(Chile) Matías Godoy	(Japan) Yamato Kumagai	(Japan) Shinshu Minamitani	(Japan) Haru Tanaka					
New Taipei Hang Yuen	(Haiti) Benchy Estama	(Japan) Naoki Kaneko	(Japan) Shingo Koreeda	(South Korea) Kwon Seung-seong	(El Salvador) William López	(Japan) Kentaro Sato	(Japan) Genki Tateiwa		
Sunny Bank AC Taipei	(Guatemala) Gustavo Garcia	(Japan) Yugo Ichiyanagi	(Japan) Ryosei Kamada	(Japan) Kenshin Katata	(Japan) Tsuyoshi Kusuyama	(Japan) Jun Uchida			
Tainan City	(Colombia) Maurício Cortés	(South Korea) Kim Sang-jun	(South Korea) Kim Sung-kyum	(Japan) So Narita	(Brazil) Matheus Porto	(France) Mohamed Sakkouh	(South Korea) Seo Chan-wook	(Brazil) Toninho	
Taipower									
Jensen Viking	(Japan) Yunosuke Fukasawa								(Haiti) Benchy Estama (Brazil) Garrydo (Chile) Matías Godoy (Burkina Faso) Ben Ouédraogo (Haiti) Jamal Ely Rousseau (Japan) Shunkun Tani (United States) Justin Wilson

=== Dual citizenship/ naturalised / heritage players ===
Club	Player 1	Player 2	Player 3
New Taipei Hang Yuen	(Canada) (Taiwan) Emilio Estevez	(Haiti) (Taiwan) Jhon Benchy	(El Salvador) (Taiwan) William López
Taichung Futuro	(Japan) (Taiwan) Yoshitaka Komori		
Leopard Cat	(Turkey) (Taiwan) Onur Dogan		

=== Personnel and sponsorship ===
Team	Manager	Captain	Kit manufacturer	Main kit sponsor
Futuro	(Taiwan) Fang Ching-ren	(Chinese Taipei) Chen Ting-yang	Joma	Hota-Gear
Leopard Cat	(Taiwan) Chiang Mu-tsai	(Kenya) Nichodemus Malika	MIE	—N/a
Ming Chuan University	(Taiwan) Tseng Tai-lin	(Chile) Matias Godoy		—N/a
New Taipei Hang Yuen	(Taiwan) Hung Chin-hwai	(Chinese Taipei) Huang Yung-chun	Tor Star	—N/a
Sunny Bank AC Taipei	(Taiwan) Chen Sing-an	(Japan) Yugo Ichiyanagi	Ucan	Sunny Bank
Tainan City TSG	(France) Raphaël Blanchon	(Chinese Taipei) Wu Chun-ching	Kelme	Taiwan Steel Group
FC Vikings	(Taiwan) Hao Yuan-shuo	(Chinese Taipei) Yu Chun-hsiang	Joma	—N/a
Taipower	(Taiwan) Huang Che-ming	(Chinese Taipei) Chen Chao-an	MIE	Taipower

=== Managerial changes ===
Team	Outgoing manager	Manner of departure	Date of vacancy	Position in table	Incoming manager	Date of appointment
Futuro	(Japan) Jun Hirabayashi	Signed by Hanoi	23 January 2024	Pre-season	(Taiwan) Fang Ching-ren	23 January 2024
Tainan City TSG	(Taiwan) Lo Chih-tsung	Resigned	12 March 2024	Pre-season	(France) Raphaël Blanchon	12 March 2024
FC Vikings	(Jamaica) Oliver Harley	Mutual consent	5 May 2024	7th	(Taiwan) Hao Yuan-shuo	5 May 2024

== League table ==
Pos	Team	Pld	W	D	L	GF	GA	GD	Pts	Qualification or relegation
1	Tainan City TSG (C)	21	15	4	2	60	16	+44	49	Qualification for the AFC Challenge League qualifying play-off
2	Futuro (Note: As 2025 Taiwan President FA Cup winners Tainan City TSG already qualified for the Challenge League playoffs via their league position, the spot reserved for the Taiwan President FA Cup winners was transferred to the Premier League runners-up, Futuro.)	21	13	4	4	41	19	+22	43	Qualification for the AFC Challenge League qualifying play-off
3	New Taipei Hang Yuan	21	12	3	6	33	19	+14	39	
4	Sunny Bank AC Taipei	21	11	3	7	35	23	+12	36	
5	Taipower	21	9	3	9	36	26	+10	30	
6	Leopard Cat	21	6	4	11	24	35	−11	22	
7	Ming Chuan University	21	5	3	13	23	47	−24	18	Qualification for the Taiwan Challenge League relegation play-off
8	FC Vikings (R)	21	0	2	19	17	84	−67	2	Relegation to the Taiwan Challenge League

Source: TFPL
Rules for classification: 1) Points; 2) Head-to-Head points; 3) Head-to-Head goal difference; 4) Head-to-Head goals scored; 5) Goal difference; 6) Goals scored
(C) Champions; (R) Relegated

== Results ==
=== Regular season ===
Each team plays a total of 21 games, playing the other teams three times.

Home \ Away	FTR	HY	TLC	MCU	SAC	TSG	TV	TPC	FTR	HY	TLC	MCU	SAC	TSG	TV	TPC	FTR	HY	TLC	MCU	SAC	TSG	TV	TPC
Futuro	—	1–0	1–1	4–0	0–2	1–0	5–1	2–1	—	—	—	1–1	0–1	—	4–0	—	—	—	—	—	—	—	—	—
New Taipei Hang Yuan	0–1	—	2–1	1–1	1–2	1–1	0–0	0–2	1–0	—	2–0	2–1	1–2	—	4–0	—	—	—	1–0	—	—	—	—	—
Leopard Cat	1–2	—	—	—	2–0	0–3	3–3	0–0	1–2	—	—	—	—	0–5	—	—	—	—	—	—	—	—	—	—
Ming Chuan University	0–4	0–3	0–1	—	1–2	0–3	2–1	3–1	—	—	3–2	—	2–2	0–1	—	1–2	—	—	1–2	—	—	—	—	—
Sunny Bank AC Taipei	0–1	0–2	0–1	5–0	—	1–1	4–0	1–1	—	—	2–0	—	—	—	4–0	2–1	—	—	—	—	—	—	—	—
Tainan City TSG	1–1	4–2	3–0	3–1	1–0	—	3–1	1–0	7–3	1–2	—	—	1–0	—	—	—	—	—	—	—	—	—	—	—
FC Vikings	1–6	0–4	2–3	0–2	2–4	2–4	—	0–4	—	—	0–7	0–2	—	0–10	—	—	—	—	—	—	—	—	—	—
Taipower	0–2	1–2	1–0	5–1	2–1	1–1	3–1	—	1–2	1–2	4–0	—	—	0–3	5–1	—	—	—	—	—	—	—	—	—

Updated to match(es) played on 25 August 2024. Source: TFPL
Legend: Blue = home team win; Yellow = draw; Red = away team win.

== Promotion–relegation playoffs ==
Ming Chuan University, finishing 7th in 2024 TFPL season, was required to play in the promotion–relegation playoffs. NUK Kuo Kuang finished 2nd in 2024 League 2 and was expected to play in the playoffs. However, Inter Taoyuan, finishing 3rd in 2024 League 2 took over the opportunity due to the NUK Kuo Kuang didn't apply for the CTFA club licensing, which is required for playing in the Taiwan Football Premier League.

18 December 2024
19:00 (UTC+8)

Ming Chuan University	2–1 (a.e.t.)	Inter Taoyuan
Ng Pui-hei 9'; Wang Hsuan 105+1'	Recap	Chen Ching-hsuan 72'

Ming Chuan University, Taoyuan
Referee: Chen Hsin-chuan

== Statistics ==
=== Scoring ===
- First goal of the season:
  (Taiwan) Gao Wei-jie for Taipower against AC Taipei (14 April 2024)

=== Top goalscorers ===
Rank	Player	Club	Goals
1	(Taiwan) Li Mao	Futuro	9
2	(Taiwan) Gao Wei-jie	Taipower	8
3	(Haiti) Benchy Estama	New Taipei Hang Yuen	7
3	(Chile) Matias Godoy	Ming Chuan University	7
5	(Colombia) Maurício Cortés	Tainan City TSG	6
6	(Taiwan) Chen Jui-chieh	Tainan City TSG	5
6	(Japan) Kaoru Takayama	Futuro	5
6	(Japan) Jun Uchida	Sunny Bank AC Taipei	5
6	(Japan) Naoyuki Yamazaki	Leopard Cat	5
10	(Taiwan) Chen Po-hao	Leopard Cat	4
10	(Taiwan) Cheng Hao	Futuro	4
10	(Japan) Yamato Kumagai	Ming Chuan University	4
10	(Taiwan) Wu Yu-fan	Taipower	4
10	(Japan) Shohei Yokoyama	Futuro	4

==== Hat-tricks ====
Player	For	Against	Score	Date	Round
(Japan) Jun Uchida	Sunny Bank AC Taipei	Ming Chuan University	5–0 (H)	30 June 2024	10
(Brazil) Toninho	Tainan City TSG	Leopard Cat	5–0 (A)	14 September 2024	15

=== Clean Sheets ===
Rank	Player	Club	Shutouts
1	(Japan) Kenya Matsui	Futuro	7
1	(Taiwan) Pan Wen-chieh	Tainan City TSG	7
3	(Taiwan) Huang Chiu-lin	Taipower	3
3	(Taiwan) Odo Jacobs	New Taipei Hang Yuen	3
5	(Taiwan) Chang Po-feng	New Taipei Hang Yuen	2
5	(Japan) Kenshin Katata	Sunny Bank AC Taipei	2
5	(Taiwan) Tuan Yu	Futuro	2
5	(Taiwan) Wang Po-han	Leopard Cat	2
9	(Taiwan) Chang Hsiang-chun	Taipower	1
9	(Taiwan) Chen Yu-chen	Taipei Vikings	1
9	(Taiwan) Huang Hao-kai	Ming Chuan University	1
9	(Taiwan) Shih Hsin-an	Leopard Cat	1
9	(Taiwan) Tuan Hsuan	Sunny Bank AC Taipei	1
9	(Taiwan) Wang Huai-chih	Ming Chuan University	1

=== Discipline ===
==== Player ====
- Most yellow cards: 5
  - (Taiwan) Chen Yao-ming (Taipei Vikings)
  - (Taiwan) Lee Pin-hsien (Leopard Cat)
  - (Japan) Nagisa Sakurauchi (Futuro)
- Most red cards: 1
  - (Taiwan) Chen Wei-chuan (Tainan City TSG)
  - (Taiwan) Chen Yao-ming (Taipei Vikings)
  - (Taiwan) Lee Pin-hsien (Leopard Cat)
  - (Taiwan) Ma Liang-cheng (Ming Chuan University)
  - (Taiwan) Peng Chia-en (Taipei Vikings)
  - (Taiwan) Tuan Hsuan (Sunny Bank AC Taipei)

==== Team ====
- Most yellow cards: 31
  - Taipower
- Fewest yellow cards: 21
  - Tainan City TSG
  - Taipei Vikings
- Most red cards: 2
  - Taipei Vikings
- Fewest red cards: 0
  - Futuro
  - New Taipei Hang Yuen
  - Taipower

== Attendances ==
#	Football club	Average attendance
1	Leopard Cat FC	439
2	Taiwan Power Company FC	269
3	Ming Chuan University FC	229
4	AC Taipei	184
5	Tainan City	159
6	FC Vikings	131
7	Taichung Futuro	130
8	Hang Yuan FC	118

== See also ==
- 2024 Taiwan Football League Division 2
- 2024 Taiwan Mulan Football League
