= Mönkh-Orgil Orkhon =

Mongolian footballer (born 1999)

Personal information
- Full name: Orkhony Mönkh-Orgil; Орхоны Мөнх-Оргил
- Date of birth: 30 January 1999 (age 27)
- Place of birth: Sükhbaatar, Mongolia
- Height: 1.87 m (6 ft 2 in)
- Position: Defender

Team information
- Current team: Central Stallions

Senior career*
Years	Team	Apps	(Gls)
2015–2025	Deren	87	(16)
2025–2026	Taichung Futuro	18	(1)
2026–	Central Stallions		

International career^{‡}
2017	Mongolia U23	9	(0)
2017–	Mongolia	18	(1)
- * Club domestic league appearances and goals as of 19:01, 15 August 2026 (UTC) ‡ National team caps and goals as of 8:02, 10 June 2021 (UTC)

Orkhony Mönkh-Orgil (Mongolian: Орхоны Мөнх-Оргил; born 30 January 1999) is a Mongolian footballer who plays as a defender for Taiwan Football Premier League club Central Stallions and the Mongolia national team.

== International career ==
Mönkh-Orgil played for the national under-23 team during the 2018 AFC U-23 Championship qualifiers in July 2017.

He made his senior international debut with Mongolia on 5 October 2017 during an international friendly against Chinese Taipei, playing the entire 90 minutes of the 4–2 defeat.

In late 2018, Mönkh-Orgil was called up for the 2019 EAFF E-1 Football Championship qualifiers. He scored his first career goal during their first round fixture against Northern Mariana Islands on 4 September 2018, scoring in the 89th minute of a 9–0 victory. He made two more appearances in the second round in losses against North Korea and Hong Kong, respectively.

Mönkh-Orgil captained Mongolia on 12 October 2023 during the second game of the first round of 2026 FIFA World Cup qualification, in which they lost to Afghanistan 1-0. Mönkh-Orgil took over for Tsend-Ayuush Khürelbaatar, who was sent off with a red card in the first match.

== Career statistics ==
=== International ===
As of match played 7 January 2019.

National team	Year	Apps	Goals
Mongolia	2017	1	0
Mongolia	2018	6	1
Total		7	1

=== International goals ===
Scores and results list Mongolia's goal tally first.

No	Date	Venue	Opponent	Score	Result	Competition
1.	4 September 2018	MFF Football Centre, Ulaanbaatar, Mongolia	Northern Mariana Islands	9–0	9–0	2019 EAFF E-1 Football Championship qualification

== Personal life ==
Mönkh-Orgil was born in Sükhbaatar and has two siblings. His older brother, father, and grandfather were all footballers.
