= Takuro Uehara =

Japanese footballer

Takuro Uehara 上原 拓郎
Personal information
- Full name: Takuro Uehara
- Date of birth: July 8, 1991 (age 35)
- Place of birth: Sapporo, Japan
- Height: 1.77 m (5 ft 9 1/2 in)
- Position: Midfielder

Team information
- Current team: Taichung Futuro

Youth career
- 2007–2009: Consadole Sapporo

College career
Years	Team	Apps	(Gls)
2010–2013	Hokkaido UE Iwamizawa		

Senior career*
Years	Team	Apps	(Gls)
2014	Consadole Sapporo	13	(0)
2015–2018	Roasso Kumamoto	69	(1)
2019–2023	FC Imabari	23	(3)
2024–	Taichung Futuro	0	(0)
- * Club domestic league appearances and goals as of 21 February 2024

Takuro Uehara (上原 拓郎, Uehara Takuro; born July 8, 1991) is a Japanese football player for Taiwan Football Premier League club Taichung Futuro.

== Career ==
On 5 January 2019, Uehara joined FC Imabari.

== Club statistics ==
Updated to 23 February 2020.

Club performance			League		Cup		Total	
Season	Club	League	Apps	Goals	Apps	Goals	Apps	Goals
Japan			League		Emperor's Cup		Total	
2014	Consadole Sapporo	J2 League	13	0	2	0	15	0
2015	Roasso Kumamoto	J2 League	15	1	2	0	17	1
2016	Roasso Kumamoto	J2 League	28	0	2	0	30	0
2017	Roasso Kumamoto	J2 League	15	0	1	0	16	0
2018	Roasso Kumamoto	J2 League	11	0	1	0	12	0
2019	FC Imabari	JFL	23	3	–		23	3
Career total			105	4	8	0	113	4
