= Nagisa Sakurauchi =

Japanese footballer (born 1989)

Nagisa Sakurauchi 櫻内 渚
Personal information
- Full name: Nagisa Sakurauchi
- Date of birth: 11 August 1989 (age 37)
- Place of birth: Yao, Osaka, Japan
- Height: 1.76 m (5 ft 9 1/2 in)
- Position: Right back

Youth career
- 2005–2007: Sakuyo High School

College career
Years	Team	Apps	(Gls)
2008–2011	Kansai University		

Senior career*
Years	Team	Apps	(Gls)
2012–2020	Júbilo Iwata	157	(13)
2021–2022	Vissel Kobe	3	(0)
2023	FC Imabari	2	(0)
2024–2026	Taichung Futuro	40	(4)
2026–	New Taipei Hang Yuan		
- * Club domestic league appearances and goals as of 08:30, 12 June 2026 (UTC)

Nagisa Sakurauchi (櫻内 渚, Sakurauchi Nagisa, born August 11, 1989) is a Japanese football player as a Right back for New Taipei Hang Yuan.

== Career ==
Sakurauchi began his youth career with Kansai University from 2008 until his graduation in 2011.

On 7 April 2011, Sakurauchi began his professional career with Jubilo Iwata from 2012. On 15 December 2020, he was announced that he would leave in Iwata, where he had been enrolled for nine years due to the expiration of his contract.

On 9 January 2021, Sakurauchi signed with the J1 club, Vissel Kobe. He left the club after two years at Kobe.

On 27 December 2022, Sakurauchi joined the J3 club, FC Imabari, for the upcoming 2023 season.

== Career statistics ==
=== Club ===
Updated to the start of 2026–27 season.

Club performance			League		Cup		League Cup		Continental		Total	
Season	Club	League	Apps	Goals	Apps	Goals	Apps	Goals	Apps	Goals	Apps	Goals
Japan			League		Emperor's Cup		J. League Cup		AFC		Total	
Taiwan			League		President FA Cup		—		AFC Cup/ACGL		Total	
2012	Júbilo Iwata	J1 League	0	0	0	0	1	0	—		1	0
2013	Júbilo Iwata	J1 League	2	0	0	0	2	0	—		4	0
2014	Júbilo Iwata	J2 League	21	3	1	0	—				22	3
2015	Júbilo Iwata	J2 League	41	5	1	0	—				42	5
2016	Júbilo Iwata	J1 League	19	1	3	0	2	0	—		24	1
2017	Júbilo Iwata	J1 League	31	2	3	0	3	0	—		37	2
2018	Júbilo Iwata	J1 League	25	2	1	0	5	1	—		31	3
2019	Júbilo Iwata	J1 League	2	0	1	0	7	0	—		10	0
2020	Júbilo Iwata	J2 League	16	0	0	0	—				16	0
2021	Vissel Kobe	J1 League	3	0	1	0	5	0	—		9	0
2022	Vissel Kobe	J1 League	—						2	0	2	0
2023	FC Imabari	J3 League	0	0	0	0	—				0	0
2024	Taichung Futuro	TFPL	20	2	—				2	0	22	2
2025–26	Taichung Futuro	TFPL	20	2	6	0	—				26	2
2026–27	New Taipei Hang Yuan	TFPL			—							
Career total			200	17	17	0	25	1	4	0	246	18
