= F.C. Vikings =

Vikings
- Full name: Football Club Vikings
- Founded: 2010; 15 years ago
- Owner: Johnni Nielsen
- Head coach: Hope Tsai
- League: Taiwan Challenge League
- 2024: TFPL, 8th of 8 (relegated)
- Website: www.fcviking.com
Home colours	Away colours

Football Club Vikings, also known as Taipei Vikings (Chinese: 臺北Vikings), are a Taiwanese professional football club based in Taipei. They are currently playing in the Taiwan Challenge League. They previously played in the top-flight Taiwan Football Premier League during the 2024 season.

== History ==
Danish coach Johnni Nielsen and his family moved to Taiwan in 2009 for his daughter's healthcare. He is married to a Taiwanese woman. He is a UEFA B Licence and was a youth coach for Slagelse B&I. He would find Taiwanese clubs too old-fashioned and focused on intense fitness training for his son. He decided to teach his son himself in a local park which also enticed other underprivilege youth. Eventually this led to the establishment of FC Vikings as a non-profit football academy in 2010. Nielsen provided coaching pro-bono. He named the organization "Vikings" as a reference to his roots.

FC Vikings became the official football academy of Tatung FC (now Leopard Cat FC).

From 2020, the team competed in the Taiwanese second division after the formation of a professional adult team called Vikings PlayOne. It was formed from Shih Hsin University students, with international players being added later. It won the 2023 second division title, and was promoted to the Taiwan Football Premier League for the 2024 season. However the team got relegated.

In January 2025, FC Vikings completed the acquisition of Philippines Football League side, Maharlika F.C.
