= Chen Wei-chuan =

Taiwanese footballer

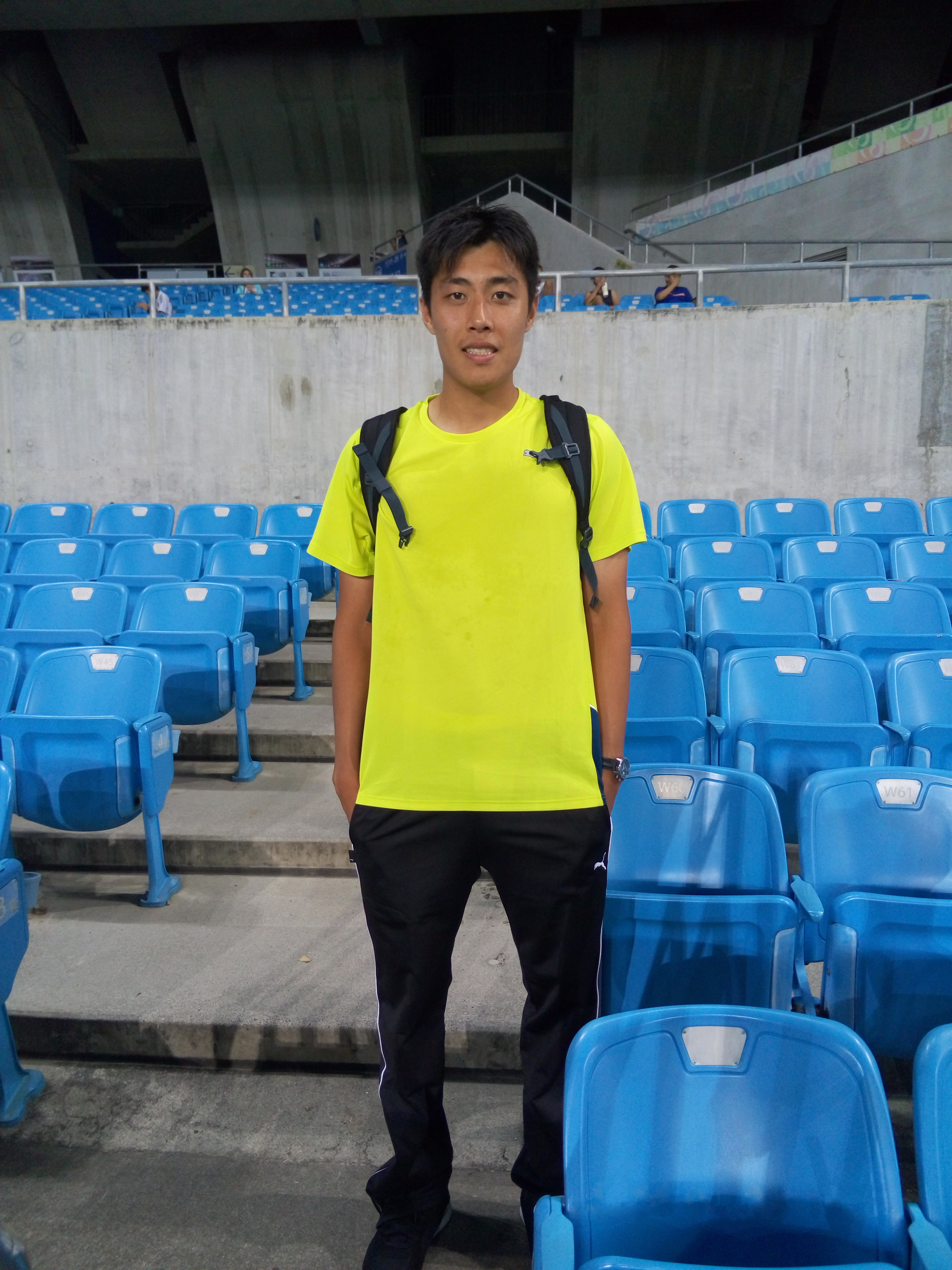
- Chen Wei-chuan in 2016

Personal information
- Date of birth: August 29, 1992 (age 34)
- Place of birth: Tainan, Taiwan
- Height: 1.86 m (6 ft 1 in)
- Position: Defender

Team information
- Current team: Taiwan Steel
- Number: 2

Senior career*
Years	Team	Apps	(Gls)
2012–2019	Tatung		
2014–2015	→ Hunan Xiangtao (loan)		
2020–	Taiwan Steel	1	(1)

International career^{‡}
2015–	Chinese Taipei	37	(2)
- * Club domestic league appearances and goals as of 12 April 2020 ‡ National team caps and goals as of 4 July 2016

Chen Wei-chuan (Chinese: 陳威全; born 29 August 1992) is a Taiwanese footballer who currently plays as a defender for the national and club level for Taiwan Steel.

== International goals ==
No.	Date	Venue	Opponent	Score	Result	Competition
1.	19 March 2016	Kaohsiung National Stadium, Kaohsiung, Taiwan.	Guam	3–2	3–2	Friendly
2	30 June 2016	GFA National Training Center, Dededo, Guam	Northern Mariana Islands	2–0	8–1	2017 EAFF E-1 Football Championship
