= Naoyuki Yamazaki =

Japanese footballer

Personal information
- Date of birth: 5 May 1991 (age 35)
- Place of birth: Nishitōkyō, Japan
- Height: 1.81 m (5 ft 11 in)
- Position: Midfielder

Team information
- Current team: AC Taipei

Youth career
- Izumi FC
- 2004–2009: FC Tokyo

College career
Years	Team	Apps	(Gls)
2010–2013	Tokyo Gakugei University		

Senior career*
Years	Team	Apps	(Gls)
2014	Azul Claro Numazu	2	(0)
2015–2016	HBO Tokyo		
2016–2017	Telstar	25	(3)
2018	IF Gnistan	10	(4)
2019	PEPO	10	(0)
2021	Taichung Futuro		
2022–2024	Leopard Cat		
2025–	AC Taipei		
- * Club domestic league appearances and goals

Naoyuki Yamazaki (山崎 直之, Yamazaki Naoyuki; born 5 May 1991) is a Japanese footballer who plays as a midfielder for Taiwan Football Premier League club AC Taipei.

== Club career ==
In 2009, while Yamazaki was an under-18 player at FC Tokyo, the club told him his chances of being promoted to the first team were slim and Yamazaki enrolled at Tokyo Gakugei University. In his first year he was leading goalscorer of the team and was named Rookie of the Year. The following year, he contributed to the side's promotion to the first division.

Yamazaki was not signed by a professional club and in 2014 moved to Japan Football League club Azul Claro Numazu.

Yamazaki became a professional at the age of 25 when he joined Dutch club SC Telstar, playing in the Eerste Divisie. He made his debut in the league on 9 September 2016 in a game against De Graafschap. In January 2017 it was reported that Telstar would likely not be able to afford his salary the following season due to rules involving minimum salaries for footballers from countries outside the European Union. Yamazaki scored three goals from March until the end of the season and made 24 appearances.

Yamazaki signed a contract until end of the season with Finnish third-tier club IF Gnistan in July 2018.
