= Hsu Heng-pin =

Taiwanese footballer

Personal information
- Date of birth: 17 April 1993 (age 33)
- Place of birth: Taichung, Taiwan
- Height: 1.82 m (6 ft 0 in)
- Position: Midfielder

Team information
- Current team: Taichung Futuro
- Number: 17

Youth career
- 2008–2011: National Pei Men HS

Senior career*
Years	Team	Apps	(Gls)
2011–2012	Ming Chuan University		
2013–2015	NTUS		
2017–2018	NSTC		
2018–	Taichung Futuro	69	(5)

International career^{‡}
2011–2012	Chinese Taipei U19		
2014–2015	Chinese Taipei U23	3	(0)
2021–	Chinese Taipei	3	(1)
- * Club domestic league appearances and goals as of 15:16, 25 May 2026 (UTC) ‡ National team caps and goals as of 16:48, 25 December 2021 (UTC)

Hsu Heng-pin (Chinese: 許恆賓; born 17 April 1993) is a Taiwanese international footballer who plays as a midfielder for Taichung Futuro and Chinese Taipei national football team.

== Career statistics ==
=== International ===
As of matches played 25 December 2021.

National team	Year	Apps	Goals
Chinese Taipei	2021	3	1
Total		3	1

=== International goals ===
Scores and results list Taiwan's goal tally first, score column indicates score after each Taiwan goal.

List of international goals scored by Hsu
No.	Date	Venue	Opponent	Score	Result	Competition
1	7 October 2021	Chang Arena, Buriram, Thailand	Indonesia	1–2	1–2	2023 AFC Asian Cup qualification

== Club career statistics ==
Appearances and goals by club, season and competition
Club	Season	League			AFC Cup		President Cup		AFC Challenge	
Club	Season	Division	Apps	Goals	Apps	Goals	Apps	Goals	Apps	Goals
Ming Chuan University	2011	National Intercity Football League	12	5						
Taichung City Dragon	2013	National Intercity Football League	14	5						
Taichung FC	2014	National Intercity Football League	8	2						
National Sports Training Center	2017	Taiwan Football Premier League	24	2						
National Sports Training Center	2018	Taiwan Football Premier League	17	3						
National Sports Training Center	Total		0	0	0	0	0	0	0	0
Taichung Futuro	2019	Taiwan Football Premier League	1	0						
Taichung Futuro	2020	Taiwan Football Premier League	12	0						
Taichung Futuro	2021	Taiwan Football Premier League	13	0						
Taichung Futuro	2022	Taiwan Football Premier League	8	1						
Taichung Futuro	2023	Taiwan Football Premier League	12	1	7	3				
Taichung Futuro	2024	Taiwan Football Premier League	11	2	2	0				
Taichung Futuro	2025–26	Taiwan Football Premier League	1	0	—		5	5	1	0
Taichung Futuro	Total		0	0	0	0	0	0	0	0
Total			133	21	9	3	5	5	1	0

== AFC Cup goals ==
Goal No.	Date	Venue	Opponent	Round	Result	Competition
1.	5 October 2023	(Mongolia) MFF Football Centre	(Mongolia) Ulaanbaatar	Group Stage	2 – 0	2023–24 AFC Cup
2.	26 October 2023	(Taiwan) National Stadium	Taiwan Steel	Group Stage	2 – 1	2023–24 AFC Cup
3.	14 December 2023	(Taiwan) Kaohsiung Nanzih Football Stadium	(Mongolia) Ulaanbaatar	Group Stage	1 – 2	2023–24 AFC Cup

== President Cup goals ==
Goal No.	Date	Venue	Opponent	Round	Result	Competition
1.	10 May 2025	Taichung Xitun Football Stadium	Nanshi Taigang Green	Group Stage	4 – 0	2025 CTFA National President Cup
2.	17 May 2025	National Taiwan Sport University	Yangxin Taipei Bravo	Quarter-final; Knockout stage	2 – 1	2025 CTFA National President Cup
