= Lin Che-yu =

Taiwanese footballer

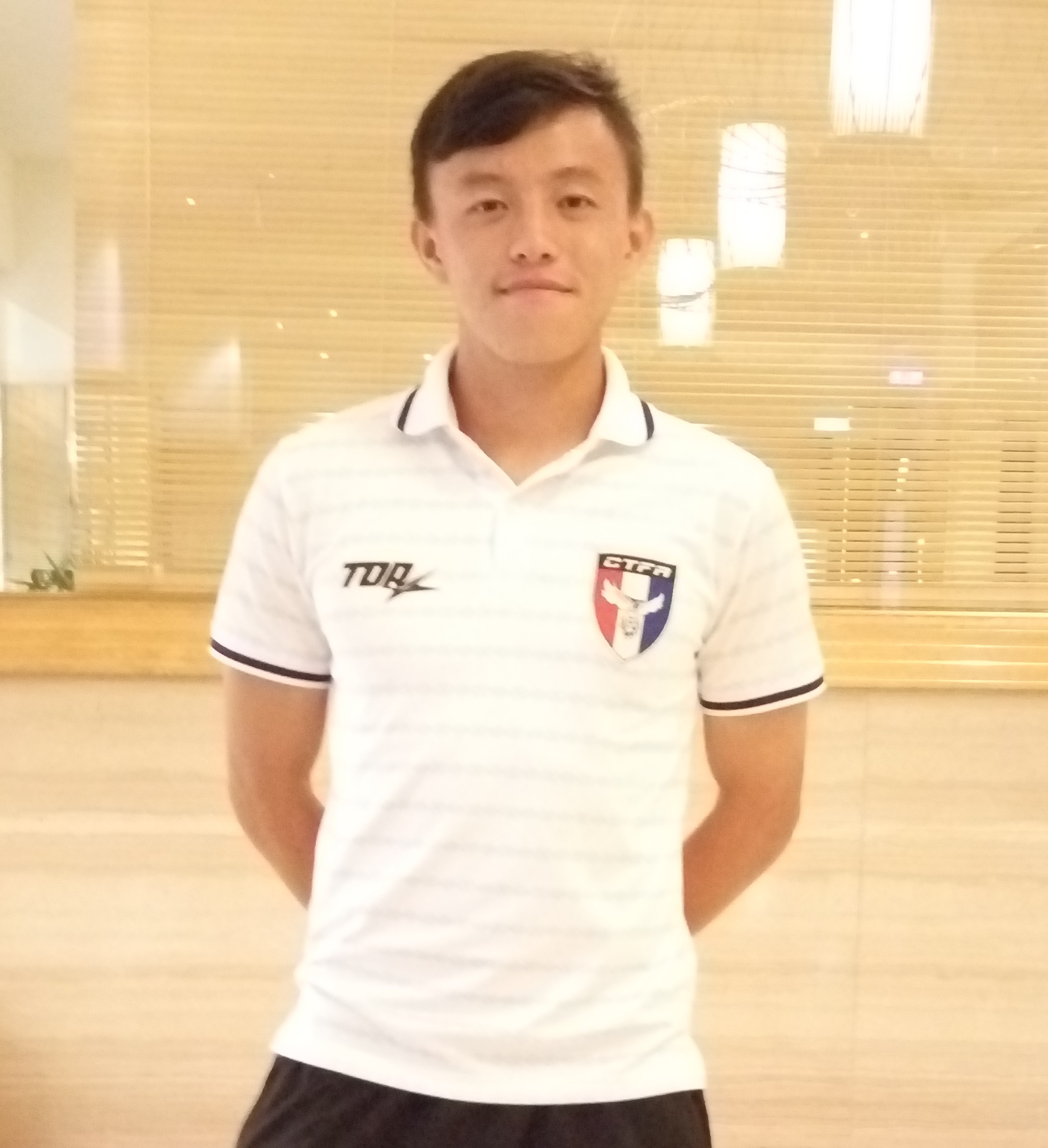
- Lin Che-yu in 2016

Personal information
- Date of birth: February 11, 1993 (age 33)
- Place of birth: Taichung, Taiwan
- Height: 1.71 m (5 ft 7 1/2 in)
- Position: Defensive midfielder

Team information
- Current team: Taichung Futuro
- Number: 34

Youth career
- National Taiwan University of Physical Education and Sport

Senior career*
| Years | Team | Apps | (Gls) |
| 2013–2015 | National Taiwan University of Physical Education and Sport | | |
| 2015–2022 | National Sports Training Center football team | | |
| 2023–2026 | Taichung Futuro | 35 | (1) |

International career^{‡}
| 2015– | Chinese Taipei | 2 | (0) |
- * Club domestic league appearances and goals as of 25 May 2026 ‡ National team caps and goals as of 12 November 2015

Lin Che-yu (Chinese: 林哲宇; born 11 February 1993) is a Taiwanese footballer who currently plays as a defensive midfielder for Taiwan Football Premier League club Taichung Futuro and Chinese Taipei national football team.
