= Taichung Futuro F.C. =

Taiwanese football club

Taichung Futuro
- Full name: Taichung Football Academy Futuro
- Short name: TFAF
- Founded: 2016; 10 years ago
- Ground: Xitun Football Field; Taiyuan Football Field
- Capacity: 200; 600
- Owner: Yoshitaka Komori
- Head coach: Fang Ching-ren
- League: Taiwan Football Premier League
- 2025–26: TFPL, 4th of 8
- Website: https://www.taichung-futuro.com/zh-Hant
Home colours	Away colours

Taichung Futuro Football Club (Chinese: 台中Futuro) is a professional football club based in Taichung, Taiwan which currently competes in the Taiwan Football Premier League.

== History ==
Taichung Futuro Football Academy was founded in 2016 by Japanese footballer Yoshitaka Komori. The men's team was established in 2018. A second-place finish in 2022 meant qualification to next season's AFC Cup play-offs. They secured a group stage place in the 2023-24 AFC Cup after beating Macanese side Monte Carlo 2–1 in the East Asia Zone play off, and managed to secure progression to the Inter-zone play-off semi-finals by virtue of goal difference over Mongolia's FC Ulaanbaatar.

== Kits ==
=== Kit manufacturers and shirt sponsors ===
Period	Kit manufacturer	Main shirt sponsor (chest)
2019	Yonex	Sweeten Real Estate Development
2020	Next	various
2021–2022	MIE	Lihpao Resort
2023	MIE	Changhua County Government
2024	Joma	Hota-Gear
2025–present	Joma	Taichung City Government

== Players ==
=== First team squad ===
As of 11 October 2026

Note: Flags indicate national team as defined under FIFA eligibility rules; some limited exceptions apply. Players may hold more than one non-FIFA nationality.

No.	Pos.	Nation	Player
1	GK	TPE	Lee Ming-wei
2	DF	JPN	Oki Sakimoto (on loan from Osaka)
3	DF	TPE	Chen Ting-yang (captain)
4	FW	TPE	Tseng Te-lung
5	FW	TPE	Cheng Hao
6	DF	TPE	Tsai Chieh-hsun
7	DF	JPN	Keisuke Ogawa
8	DF	TPE	Yoshitaka Komori
9	DF	TPE	Chen Hung-wei
10	MF	JPN	Ren Nishimura (on loan from V-Varen Nagasaki)
11	FW	KOR	Lee Han-hee (on loan from Osaka)
12	MF	TPE	Wen Chih-hao
13	FW	JPN	Ryota Saito (on loan from V-Varen Nagasaki)
17	FW	TPE	Hsu Heng-pin
18	FW	TPE	Li Mao

No.	Pos.	Nation	Player
19	DF	TPE	Li Ya-she
20	MF	TPE	Su Ming-chiang
21	GK	TPE	Tuan Yu
22	GK	USA	Edison Castro
23	MF	JPN	Kaoru Takayama
34	MF	TPE	Lin Che-yu
42	MF	TPE	Liu Wei-che
43	DF	TPE	Liang Meng-hsin
50	GK	JPN	Kenya Matsui
77	MF	TPE	Lai Yi-chiao
88	DF	TPE	Tseng Sai-te
95	MF	TPE	Chang Heng
96	MF	TPE	Wu Po-jui
99	MF	TPE	Lin Chun-chieh

=== Reserves team squad ===
As of 24 September 2026

Note: Flags indicate national team as defined under FIFA eligibility rules; some limited exceptions apply. Players may hold more than one non-FIFA nationality.

No.	Pos.	Nation	Player
3	DF	TPE	Yang Chih-hsun
7	DF	TPE	Chen Hung-li
8	DF	TPE	Chuang Kang-yen
10	FW	TPE	Cheng Yu-chi
11	MF	TPE	Chen Ke
17	MF	TPE	Sam Cooperman
19	MF	TPE	Chang Hsiu-yuan
22	MF	TPE	Ho Chin-heng
23	MF	TPE	Bowen Bartlett

No.	Pos.	Nation	Player
27	MF	TPE	Fang Ching-ren
33	GK	TPE	Jamie Kelleher
37	FW	TPE	Hsieh Chang-yu
42	MF	TPE	Huang Cheng-hsiang
44	MF	TPE	Chiu Hao-ming
66	MF	TPE	Tsai Cheng-feng
77	MF	JPN	Seiji Fujiwara
89	MF	TPE	Ting Wei-chieh

==== Out on loan ====
As of 24 September 2026

Note: Flags indicate national team as defined under FIFA eligibility rules; some limited exceptions apply. Players may hold more than one non-FIFA nationality.

No.	Pos.	Nation	Player
43	DF	TPE	Peng Chuan-min (at Taichung City)
50	GK	TPE	Lee Jui-nan (at Babuza)
57	DF	TPE	Lin Ting-wei (at Taichung City)

== Management ==
=== Coaching staff ===
Position	Staff
Head coach	(Taiwan) Fang Ching-ren
Assistant coach	(Taiwan) Li Yan-ting

=== Club personnel ===
Position	Staff
Founder	(Japan) Yoshitaka Komori
Club Manager	(Taiwan) Ho Yun-tung
Athletic trainer	(Taiwan) Lin En
Physical therapist	(Taiwan) Hu Hsueh-feng
Media	(Taiwan) Chen Chia-pao

== Records ==
=== Year-by-year ===
Season	League											Position	President FA Cup	International/Continental		Top goalscorer(s)	
Season	Div	League	Pld	W	D	L	GF	GA	GD	Pts	PPG	Position	President FA Cup	International/Continental		Name(s)	Goals
2019	1	TFPL	21	8	4	9	37	26	+11	28	1.33	5th	Not held	DNQ		(Chinese Taipei) Chen Sheng-wei (Chinese Taipei) Li Mao	7
2020	1	TFPL	21	12	3	6	33	17	+16	39	1.86	3rd	Not held	DNQ		(South Korea) Joo Ik-seong	19
2021	1	TFPL	14	8	2	4	20	11	+9	26	1.86	3rd	Not held	DNQ		(Japan) Shohei Yokoyama	5
2022	1	TFPL	18	10	7	1	36	11	+25	37	2.06	2nd	Not held	DNQ		(Haiti) Jhon Benchy	18
2023	1	TFPL	21	8	4	9	33	31	+2	28	1.33	5th	Not held	AFC Cup	IZSF	(Haiti) Jhon Benchy	9
2024	1	TFPL	21	13	4	4	41	19	+22	43	2.05	2nd	Not held	AFC Cup	IZSF	(Chinese Taipei) Li Mao	10
2025–26	1	TFPL	21	11	1	9	34	22	+12	34	1.62	4th	SF	ACGL	PS	(Chinese Taipei) Lai Yi-chiao	12
2026–27	1	TFPL											Not held	DNQ			
Total	–	–	137	70	25	42	234	137	+97	235	1.72	–	–	–	–	(Chinese Taipei) Li Mao	37

1. Top goalscorer(s) includes all goals scored in League, Taiwan President FA Cup, AFC Cup, AFC Challenge League, and other competitive continental matches but excludes goals in their qualifying matches.

=== International competition ===
Season	Competition	Round	Club	Home	Away	Aggregate
2023–24	AFC Cup	Play-off round	(Macau) Monte Carlo	2–1		
2023–24	AFC Cup	Group I	(Macau) Chao Pak Kei	1–0	1–0	1st out of 4
2023–24	AFC Cup	Group I	(Mongolia) FC Ulaanbaatar	1–2	2–0	1st out of 4
2023–24	AFC Cup	Group I	(Chinese Taipei) Tainan City TSG	2–1	1–5	1st out of 4
2023–24	AFC Cup	Inter-zone play-off semi-finals	(Kyrgyzstan) Abdysh-Ata Kant	1–3	0–5	1–8
2025–26	AFC Challenge League	Preliminary stage	(Mongolia) SP Falcons	1–3		

=== Head coaches ===
Head coach	Nat.	Tenure
Juang Ming-yen	Taiwan	2019, 2023
Toshiaki Imai	Japan	2020
Vom Ca-nhum	Taiwan	2020–2022
Jun Hirabayashi	Japan	2023
Pen Wu-sung	Taiwan	2023–2024 (AFC Cup)
Fang Ching-ren	Taiwan	2024–present

=== Captains ===
Name	Nat.	Years
Li Mao	Taiwan	2019
Chen Ting-yang	Taiwan	2020–present
