= Kaoru Takayama =

Japanese footballer

Kaoru Takayama 高山 薫
Personal information
- Full name: Kaoru Takayama
- Date of birth: July 8, 1988 (age 38)
- Place of birth: Takatsu-ku, Kawasaki, Japan
- Height: 1.74 m (5 ft 8 1/2 in)
- Position: Forward

Team information
- Current team: Taichung Futuro
- Number: 23

Youth career
- 2001–2006: Kawasaki Frontale

College career
Years	Team	Apps	(Gls)
2007–2010	Senshu University		

Senior career*
Years	Team	Apps	(Gls)
2011–2013	Shonan Bellmare	105	(19)
2014	Kashiwa Reysol	32	(4)
2015–2018	Shonan Bellmare	96	(13)
2019–2023	Oita Trinita	20	(0)
2023	Sagamihara		
2023–	Taichung Futuro	42	(11)
Medal record
Shonan Bellmare
Winner	J.League Cup	2018
- * Club domestic league appearances and goals as of 25 May 2026

Kaoru Takayama (高山 薫, Takayama Kaoru; born July 8, 1988) is a Japanese football player for Taiwan Football Premier League club Taichung Futuro.

== Club statistics ==
Updated to 25 February 2019.

Club performance			League		Cup		League Cup		Asia		Total	
Season	Club	League	Apps	Goals	Apps	Goals	Apps	Goals	Apps	Goals	Apps	Goals
Japan			League		Emperor's Cup		J. League Cup		AFC		Total	
2011	Shonan Bellmare	J2 League	35	9	4	2	-		-		39	11
2012	Shonan Bellmare	J2 League	38	6	1	0	-		-		39	6
2013	Shonan Bellmare	J1 League	32	4	1	0	3	0	-		36	4
2014	Kashiwa Reysol	J1 League	32	4	2	0	10	0	-		44	4
2015	Shonan Bellmare	J1 League	33	7	1	1	3	0	-		37	8
2016	Shonan Bellmare	J1 League	33	4	2	1	5	0	-		40	5
2017	Shonan Bellmare	J2 League	8	2	0	0	-		-		8	2
2018	Shonan Bellmare	J1 League	22	0	2	1	8	1	-		32	2
2019	Oita Trinita	J1 League	20	0	2	0	2	0	-		24	0
Total			253	36	15	5	31	1	-		299	42
