= Shohei Yokoyama =

Japanese footballer

Personal information
- Full name: Shohei Yokoyama
- Date of birth: August 9, 1993 (age 33)
- Place of birth: Gunma, Japan
- Height: 1.72 m (5 ft 7 1/2 in)
- Positions: Attacking midfielder; left winger

Team information
- Current team: Gold Coast Knights

Youth career
- 2003: FC Oura
- 2003–2006: Oizumi FC
- 2006–2007: Tonan Oko
- 2007–2008: Tonan Maebashi
- 2009–2011: Maebashi Ikuei High School

Senior career*
Years	Team	Apps	(Gls)
2012–2016	Thespakusatsu Gunma	68	(4)
2016	→ Machida Zelvia (loan)	0	(0)
2017–2018	Međimurec DP	34	(24)
2018	Deutschlandsberger SC	14	(3)
2019–2020	Varaždin	5	(0)
2021–2024	Taichung Futuro	44	(15)
2025	Gold Coast Knights		
2025–	Taichung Futuro	21	(3)
- * Club domestic league appearances and goals as of 15:13, 25 May 2026 (UTC)

Shohei Yokoyama (横山 翔平, born August 9, 1993) is a Japanese football player who plays as a midfielder or a winger for Taichung Futuro in Taiwan.

Having started his career in Japan, Yokoyama moved to Croatia, joining fourth-tier NK Međimurec DP, spending a year and a half there, becoming the club's top scorer with 22 goals in the 2017/18 season. In 2018 he moved to Austrian third-tier team DSC Wonisch Installationen, but returned in December to Croatia, this time to second-tier Varaždin.

== Career statistics ==
Updated to 23 February 2016.

Appearances and goals by club, season and competition
Club	Season	League			Emperor's Cup		Total	
Club	Season	Division	Apps	Goals	Apps	Goals	Apps	Goals
Thespakusatsu Gunma	2012	J2 League	19	1	1	0	20	1
Thespakusatsu Gunma	2013	J2 League	31	3	1	0	32	3
Thespakusatsu Gunma	2014	J2 League	12	0	0	0	12	0
Thespakusatsu Gunma	2015	J2 League	6	0	1	0	7	0
Career total			68	4	3	0	71	4
