= Li Mao (footballer) =

Taiwanese footballer

Personal information
- Date of birth: November 2, 1992 (age 34)
- Place of birth: Hualien, Taiwan
- Height: 1.77 m (5 ft 10 in)
- Position: Striker

Team information
- Current team: Taichung Futuro F.C.
- Number: 18

Senior career*
Years	Team	Apps	(Gls)
2014–2017	Hasus TSU F.C.		
2018	Taipower FC		
2019–	Taichung Futuro F.C.	122	(31)

International career^{‡}
2013–	Chinese Taipei	30	(5)
- * Club domestic league appearances and goals as of 25 May 2026 ‡ National team caps and goals as of 15 June 2021

Li Mao (Chinese: 李茂; born 2 November 1992) is a Taiwanese footballer who currently plays as a striker for Taichung Futuro F.C. in the Taiwan Football Premier League and for the Chinese Taipei national football team.

Li gained attention by being top scorer with four goals in three matches at the 2017 CTFA International Tournament, with two goals against the Philippines, and two goals against Laos, described by Taipei Times as "the key player for Taiwan."

== International career ==
=== International goals ===
Scores and results list Chinese Taipei's goal tally first.

No	Date	Venue	Opponent	Score	Result	Competition
1.	11 October 2013	Panaad Stadium, Bacolod, Philippines	Philippines	1–0	2–1	2013 Philippine Peace Cup
2.	3 December 2017	Taipei Municipal Stadium, Tapei, Taiwan	Philippines	1–0	3–0	2017 CTFA International Tournament
3.	3 December 2017	Taipei Municipal Stadium, Tapei, Taiwan	Philippines	2–0	3–0	2017 CTFA International Tournament
4.	5 December 2017	Taipei Municipal Stadium, Tapei, Taiwan	Laos	1–0	2–0	2017 CTFA International Tournament
5.	5 December 2017	Taipei Municipal Stadium, Tapei, Taiwan	Laos	2–0	2–0	2017 CTFA International Tournament
