= Yoshitaka Komori =

Japanese footballer

Personal information
- Date of birth: 27 March 1987 (age 39)
- Place of birth: Yokohama, Kanagawa, Japan
- Height: 1.73 m (5 ft 8 in)
- Position: Midfielder

Team information
- Current team: Taichung Futuro
- Number: 8

Youth career
- –2004: YSCC Yokohama
- 2005–2006: Japan Soccer College
- 2008: FC Kyoto

Senior career*
Years	Team	Apps	(Gls)
2009	Albirex Niigata Singapore	13	(0)
2010	Osotspa		
2018–2019	NTUS		
2019–	Taichung Futuro	100	(1)

International career^{‡}
2021–	Chinese Taipei	3	(0)
- * Club domestic league appearances and goals as of 11 October 2026 ‡ National team caps and goals as of 20 February 2022

Yoshitaka Komori (小森 由貴, Komori Yoshitaka; born 27 March 1987) is a professional footballer who currently plays for Taiwanese team Taichung Futuro. Born in Japan, he represents the Chinese Taipei national football team at international level.

== Career statistics ==
=== Club ===
As of 20 February 2022

Club	Season	League			National Cup		League Cup		Other		Total	
Club	Season	Division	Apps	Goals	Apps	Goals	Apps	Goals	Apps	Goals	Apps	Goals
Albirex Niigata Singapore	2009	S.League	13	0	0	0	0	0	0	0	13	0
Taichung Futuro	2020	TFPL	21	1	0	0	—		0	0	21	1
Taichung Futuro	2021	TFPL	14	0	0	0	—		0	0	14	0
Taichung Futuro	Total		35	1	0	0	0	0	0	0	35	1
Career total			48	1	0	0	0	0	0	0	48	1
