= Kenya Matsui =

Japanese footballer

Kenya Matsui 松井 謙弥
Personal information
- Full name: Kenya Matsui
- Date of birth: September 10, 1985 (age 41)
- Place of birth: Kakegawa, Shizuoka, Japan
- Height: 1.87 m (6 ft 1 1/2 in)
- Position: Goalkeeper

Team information
- Current team: Taichung Futuro
- Number: 50

Youth career
- 2001–2003: Júbilo Iwata

Senior career*
Years	Team	Apps	(Gls)
2004–2008	Júbilo Iwata	2	(0)
2009	Kyoto Sanga FC	1	(0)
2010–2012	Cerezo Osaka	15	(0)
2013–2014	Tokushima Vortis	42	(0)
2015	Kawasaki Frontale	0	(0)
2016–2017	Omiya Ardija	5	(0)
2018–2020	Mito HollyHock	86	(0)
2021	Cerezo Osaka	0	(0)
2022	Blaublitz Akita	0	(0)
2023–	Taichung Futuro	48	(0)
Medal record
Júbilo Iwata
Runner-up	Emperor's Cup	2004
Representing Japan
AFC U-19 Championship
Bronze medal – third place	2004 Malaysia
- * Club domestic league appearances and goals as of 25 May 2026

Kenya Matsui (松井 謙弥, Matsui Ken'ya; born September 10, 1985) is a Japanese footballer who plays as a goalkeeper for Taichung Futuro.

== National team career ==
In June 2005, Matsui was selected Japan U-20 national team for 2005 World Youth Championship. But he did not play in the match, as he was the team's reserve goalkeeper behind Shusaku Nishikawa.

== Club statistics ==
As of 7 January 2022

Club performance			League		Cup		League Cup		Continental		Other		Total	
Season	Club	League	Apps	Goals	Apps	Goals	Apps	Goals	Apps	Goals	Apps	Goals	Apps	Goals
2004	Júbilo Iwata	J1 League	1	0	0	0	0	0	0	0	-		1	0
2005	Júbilo Iwata	J1 League	0	0	0	0	0	0	0	0	-		0	0
2006	Júbilo Iwata	J1 League	0	0	0	0	4	0	-		-		5	0
2007	Júbilo Iwata	J1 League	0	0	1	0	2	0	-		-		3	0
2008	Júbilo Iwata	J1 League	1	0	2	0	5	0	-		-		8	0
2009	Kyoto Sanga FC	J1 League	1	0	0	0	0	0	-		-		1	0
2010	Cerezo Osaka	J1 League	15	0	2	0	1	0	-		-		18	0
2011	Cerezo Osaka	J1 League	0	0	2	0	0	0	0	0	-		2	0
2012	Cerezo Osaka	J1 League	0	0	4	0	3	0	-		-		7	0
2013	Tokushima Vortis	J2 League	36	0	1	0	-		-		2	0	39	0
2014	Tokushima Vortis	J1 League	6	0	0	0	1	0	-		-		7	0
2015	Kawasaki Frontale	J1 League	0	0	0	0	0	0	-		-		0	0
2016	Omiya Ardija	J1 League	0	0	2	0	1	0	-		-		3	0
2017	Omiya Ardija	J1 League	5	0	0	0	2	0	-		-		7	0
2018	Mito HollyHock	J2 League	29	0	0	0	-		-		-		29	0
2019	Mito HollyHock	J2 League	36	0	0	0	-		-		-		36	0
2020	Mito HollyHock	J2 League	21	0	-		-		-		-		21	0
2021	Cerezo Osaka	J1 League	0	0	0	0	-		1	0	-		1	0
2022	Blaublitz Akita	J2 League	0	0	0	0	-		-		-		0	0
Career total			151	0	14	0	20	0	1	0	2	0	188	0

^{1}Includes Promotion Playoffs to J1.
