= List of foreign Taiwan Football Premier League players =

This is a list of foreign players in Taiwan Football Premier League (TFPL).

- Players in **bold** are currently playing in TFPL. Clubs in **bold** indicate their current clubs.
- Players ineligible to play for Chinese Taipei are considered as foreign players.
- Naturalized players are also listed below despite their eligibility for Chinese Taipei. Flags indicate their national origins.

== Naturalized players ==
- **(Haiti) Jhon Benchy** – New Taipei Hang Yuan, Tainan City TSG, Futuro, Taipei Vikings, **Kaohsiung Attackers** – 2019–
- (Turkey) Onur Doğan – Tatung, Taichung Futuro – 2018–2024
- **(Japan) Yoshitaka Komori** – NTUS, **Taichung Futuro** – 2018–
- (Ivory Coast) Ange Kouamé – Tatung, Tainan City TSG – 2018–2023
- **(El Salvador) William López** – Royal Blues, **New Taipei Hang Yuan** – 2017–

== Argentina ==
- Facundo Aranda – Tainan City TSG – 2025
- Esteban Gómez – Tainan City TSG – 2025–2026

== Australia ==
- Dario De Stefano – Royal Blues – 2018
- Bradley Sibanda – Ming Chuan University – 2026

== Brazil ==
- Vitor Alves – Tainan City TSG, Flight Skywalkers – 2020–2021
- **Luan Anderson** – New Taipei Hang Yuan, Taipei Dragons, Tainan City TSG, **Kaohsiung Attackers** – 2020–2023, 2026–
- Antônio Gamaroni – Tainan City TSG – 2024
- Garrydo – Taipei Vikings, Leopard Cat – 2024
- Igor Mauricio – Tainan City TSG, Flight Skywalkers – 2020–2021
- Jean Moser – Tainan City TSG – 2023
- **Otavio Neto** – **Kaohsiung Attackers** – 2026–
- **Matheus Porto** – **Tainan City TSG** – 2024–
- Rafael – CPC Corporation – 2021
- **Wilker** – **Tainan City TSG** – 2026–

== Burkina Faso ==
- Ben Ouédraogo – Taicheng Lions, Leopard Cat, New Taipei Hang Yuan, Taipei Vikings – 2018–2024
- **Gaël Zabramba** – Ming Chuan University, **Tatung Taiwan Leopard Cat** – 2025–

== Chile ==
- Crisosto Araya – Red Lions – 2020
- Matias Carvajal – Taipei Red Lions, CPC Corporation – 2019, 2021
- Bastian Galfin – Taipei Red Lions – 2019
- **Matias Godoy** – Tainan City TSG, CPC Corporation, Futuro, Taipei Vikings, Ming Chuan University, **Sunny Bank AC Taipei** – 2019–
- Herrera Gonzalez – Red Lions – 2020
- Esteban Vasquez – Red Lions – 2020
- Bryan Vega – Ming Chuan University – 2026
- Alejandro Vera – Taipei Red Lions – 2019
- Angelo Vergara – Ming Chuan University – 2026

== Colombia ==
- Maurício Cortés – Tainan City TSG – 2024
- **Kevin Moreno** – **Tainan City TSG** – 2026–
- Luis Ricci – Royal Blues – 2017–2018

== Czech Republic ==
- **Filip Simecek** – **Taichung Rock** – 2026–

== El Salvador ==
- Douglas Alfaro – Royal Blues, Red Lions – 2017–2018, 2020
- Diego Loza – Red Lions – 2019–2020
- Hugo Rodriguez – Royal Blues – 2018

== England ==
- Bryan Baird – Royal Blues – 2018
- Jake Clarke – Taipei Red Lions – 2019
- Tom Clarke – Royal Blues, Taipei Red Lions – 2017–2019
- Pete Lewry – Royal Blues – 2017–2018
- Tim Murphy – Royal Blues – 2018
- Danny Weir – Royal Blues – 2017

== Eswatini ==
- Bhekumuzi Mathunjwa – Royal Blues – 2017

== France ==
- Julien Bidet – Royal Blues – 2017–2018
- Maxime Desrumaux – Royal Blues – 2017
- Diocounda Gory – Tainan City TSG – 2025–2026
- Zacchary Meftah – Red Lions, CPC Corporation – 2018–2019, 2020–2021
- Francois Mosnier – Royal Blues, Taipei Red Lions – 2017–2019
- Loal Perron – Royal Blues, Taichung Futuro – 2017–2018, 2020
- Mohamed Sakkouh – Tainan City TSG – 2024–2025
- David Vincent – Royal Blues – 2018

== Gambia (The Gambia) ==
- Santos Barrow – Hang Yuan, Taipei Red Lions – 2018–2019
- Pa Baboucarr – Taipei Red Lions, Flight Skywalkers, CPC Corporation – 2018–2020, 2021
- Mamadi Colley – Tatung – 2018–2019
- Lamin Conteh – Taicheng Lions – 2018
- Wahab Drameh – Royal Blues – 2017
- Alagie Jassy – Tatung – 2018–2019
- Warhab Jarjou – Taicheng Lions, Taichung Futuro – 2018–2019
- Muhamed Kinteh – Royal Blues – 2017–2018
- Ebrima Njie – Taipei Red Lions – 2019
- Ebrima Nyassi – Hang Yuan – 2017
- Fadera Siaka – Taichung Futuro – 2019

== Germany ==
- Ben Bratsch – Royal Blues – 2018
- Sebastian Gruhle – Royal Blues – 2017
- **Dominik Limprecht** – **Taichung Rock** – 2026–
- Pablo Mair – Royal Blues – 2017
- Maximilian Stein – Royal Blues – 2018

== Ghana ==
- **Isreal Opoku** – **Tainan City TSG** – 2026–

== Guatemala ==
- Gustavo Arreaga – Sunny Bank AC Taipei – 2024–2026
- **Rodrigo Calderon** – **Sunny Bank AC Taipei** – 2026–
- Gerardo Rabre – Red Lions, Leopard Cat, New Taipei Hang Yuan – 2019–2023
- **Andy Ruiz** – **Kaohsiung Attackers** – 2026–

== Guinea ==
- Ismail Traore – Tainan City TSG – 2022

== Haiti ==
- Jean Alexandre – New Taipei Hang Yuan – 2018–2019
- Judelin Aveska – New Taipei Hang Yuan – 2018, 2020–2023
- Louis Emmanuel – Hang Yuan – 2020
- Peterson Joseph – Hang Yuan – 2018–2019

== Honduras ==
- **Elías Argueta** – Royal Blues, Tatung, **New Taipei Hang Yuan** – 2017–
- Javier Funes – Royal Blues, Taipei Red Lions – 2017–2019
- Luis Galo – Taicheng Lions, Taichung Futuro, Tatung – 2018–2020
- Daniel Torres – Taipei Red Lions – 2019

== Hong Kong ==
- Oliver Gerbig – Royal Blues, Taipei Red Lions – 2017–2019
- Ying Yik Chun – Hang Yuan – 2017–2019

== India ==
- Dhirpal Shah – Tatung – 2020–2021

== Indonesia ==
- Usman Diarra – New Taipei Hang Yuan – 2023

== Italy ==
- **Andrea Boschi** – **Taichung Rock** – 2026–
- **Lorenzo Costa** – **Taichung Rock** – 2026–
- Thomas Costa – Royal Blues – 2017

== Japan ==
- Shunya Ando – Hang Yuan – 2022
- Louie Bulger – Tainan City TSG – 2023
- Seiji Fujiwara – Taichung Futuro – 2019–2022
- **Yunosuke Fukasawa** – NTUS, **Tatung Taiwan Leopard Cat**, Taipei Vikings – 2018–
- Kakeru Gunji – Futuro – 2023
- **Rintaro Hama** – **Kaohsiung Attackers** – 2026–
- Yugo Ichiyanagi – Taichung Futuro, Tainan City TSG, Sunny Bank AC Taipei – 2019–2026
- Shogo Iizuka – Taipei Red Lions – 2019
- Yuki Inoue – Red Lions – 2018–2020
- Taiki Itsukaichi – Futuro – 2023
- **Taiyo Izumi** – **Tatung Taiwan Leopard Cat** – 2023–
- Ryosei Kamada – Sunny Bank AC Taipei – 2024–2026
- **Naoki Kaneko** – Futuro, **New Taipei Hang Yuan** – 2023–
- Taisei Kaneko – Taichung Futuro – 2019
- **Sota Kano** – **Sunny Bank AC Taipei** – 2026–
- **Kenshin Katata** – Taichung Futuro, **Sunny Bank AC Taipei** – 2020–2025, 2026–
- **Jun Kochi** – Futuro, **Tatung Taiwan Leopard Cat** – 2020–2023, 2025–
- Kazuya Kojima – Futuro – 2023
- **Shingo Koreeda** – **New Taipei Hang Yuan** – 2024–
- **Yamato Kumagai** – Ming Chuan University, Tatung, **Sunny Bank AC Taipei** – 2022–
- **Tsuyoshi Kusuyama** – Red Lions, Flight Skywalkers, **Sunny Bank AC Taipei** – 2020–
- Rikuto Maezato – Red Lions, Flight Skywalkers, AC Taipei – 2019–2021, 2022
- **Kenya Matsui** – **Taichung Futuro** – 2023–
- Yuichiro Misumi – Royal Blues – 2017
- Mashu Minamitani – Ming Chuan University – 2024–2025
- Takeo Miyazako – Taichung Futuro – 2022
- Takayuki Morimoto – Futuro – 2022–2023
- Shoya Nagata – Taichung Futuro – 2026
- Kotaro Nakajima – Futuro – 2023
- Koki Narita – Taichung Futuro – 2022
- So Narita – Futuro, Tainan City TSG – 2023–2025
- **Ren Nishimura** – **Taichung Futuro** – 2026–
- Tetsuo Nishiyama – Ming Chuan University – 2017, 2019
- **Keisuke Ogawa** – **Taichung Futuro** – 2019–
- Amari Oki – Futuro – 2022–2023
- Ikumi Osaka – Hang Yuan – 2019
- Takahito Ota – Taipei Red Lions – 2019
- Hideto Otomo – NTUS – 2019
- **Ryota Saito** – **Taichung Futuro** – 2025–
- **Oki Sakimoto** – **Taichung Futuro** – 2026–
- **Nagisa Sakurauchi** – Taichung Futuro, **New Taipei Hang Yuan** – 2024–
- **Kentaro Sato** – **New Taipei Hang Yuan** – 2024–
- **Kotaro Shiba** – **Kaohsiung Attackers** – 2026–
- Toshio Shimakawa – Futuro – 2024
- Atsushi Shimono – Hang Yuan – 2020–2023
- Shunya Suganuma – Futuro – 2023
- Shunnosuke Tadokoro – Ming Chuan University – 2019–2020, 2022–2023
- Shun Takada – Taichung Futuro – 2019
- **Kaoru Takayama** – **Taichung Futuro** – 2023–
- Haru Tanaka – Ming Chuan University – 2024
- Shunkun Tani – Taichung Futuro – 2019
- **Genki Tateiwa** – New Taipei Hang Yuan, **Kaohsiung Attackers** – 2024–
- Masaya Tobari – Tainan City TSG – 2020
- **Jun Uchida** – **Sunny Bank AC Taipei** – 2022–
- Kohei Ueda – Taichung Futuro – 2020
- Takuro Uehara – Futuro – 2024
- Koji Wada – Futuro – 2024
- Hitoshi Yamanaka – NTUS – 2019
- Keita Yamauchi – Taichung Futuro – 2020
- **Sora Yamauchi** – **Taichung Rock** – 2025–
- **Naoyuki Yamazaki** – Taichung Futuro, **Tatung Taiwan Leopard Cat**, Sunny Bank AC Taipei – 2021–
- Atsushi Yanagisawa – Royal Blues – 2017–2018
- Shohei Yokoyama – Taichung Futuro – 2021–2024, 2025–2026
- Shuhei Yoshida – Taipei Red Lions – 2019

== Kenya ==
- **Nichodemus Malika** – **Tatung Taiwan Leopard Cat** – 2023–
- Enock Wanyama – Tatung – 2023, 2026

== Malawi ==
- Chris Belo – Royal Blues – 2018

== Malaysia ==
- Lee Jia Xian – Land Home NTUS – 2018–2020

== Moldova ==
- **Nichita Josan** – **Taichung Rock** – 2026–

== Mongolia ==
- Batjargal Zorigtsaikhan – Royal Blues – 2018
- Munkh-Orgil Orkhon – Taichung Futuro – 2025–2026

== Morocco ==
- Soufiane Khoulal – Taipei Red Lions, CPC Corporation – 2018–2019, 2021

== Nicaragua ==
- William Lemus – Taipei Red Lions – 2019
- Luis Mayorga – Royal Blues, Taipei Red Lions – 2017, 2019

== Niger ==
- Mamane Ousseini – Hang Yuan – 2017–2019

== Nigeria ==
- Amed Alfazazi – Royal Blues – 2017

== Northern Ireland ==
- Calum Togneri – Taichung Futuro – 2019

== Panama ==
- Gerardo Rios – Royal Blues – 2017

== Paraguay ==
- Alessandro Espillaga – Land Home NTUS – 2021

== Philippines ==
- **Junell Bautista** – **Kaohsiung Attackers** – 2026–
- Nathan Rilloraz – Leopard Cat – 2024

== Poland ==
- Adam Lupinski – Royal Blues – 2017–2018
- Tomasz Morcinek – Royal Blues – 2018

== Russia ==
- Maxim Belousko – Royal Blues – 2017–2018
- **Alim Zumakulov** – Tainan City TSG, **Kaohsiung Attackers** – 2020–2023, 2026–

== Senegal ==
- Massamba Sambou – Taichung Futuro – 2021

== Serbia ==
- Filip Engelman – Taichung Futuro – 2021
- **Igor Zavis** – **Taichung Rock** – 2026–

== South Korea ==
- Ahn Byung-keon – Tainan City TSG – 2022
- Chang Jeong-bin – AC Taipei – 2022–2023
- Joo Ik-seong – New Taipei Hang Yuan, Taichung Futuro – 2019–2023
- Kim Hyun-woo – Royal Blues – 2017–2018
- **Kim Sang-jun** – **Tainan City TSG** – 2024–
- **Kim Sung-kyum** – **Tainan City TSG** – 2023–
- **Kim Young-geun** – **Tainan City TSG** – 2026–
- **Kwon Seung-seong** – New Taipei Hang Yuan, **Kaohsiung Attackers** – 2024–
- **Lee Han-hee** – **Taichung Futuro** – 2026–
- **Lee Tae-bin** – **New Taipei Hang Yuan** – 2026–
- **Lim Sang-woo** – **Tainan City TSG** – 2026–
- Mun Te-su – Taichung Futuro – 2020–2021
- **Oh Se-sim** – **Tainan City TSG** – 2026–
- Oh Tae-gyun – Ming Chuan University – 2026
- Oh Yong-myung – AC Taipei – 2022–2023
- Seo Chan-wook – Tainan City TSG – 2024
- Sim Woon-sub – Tainan City TSG – 2022
- Song Han-ki – CPC Corporation – 2021

== Spain ==
- Jorge Arganza – Royal Blues – 2017
- Miguel De Felipe – Royal Blues – 2017
- Joshua del Valle – Red Lions – 2020
- Jose Dominguez – AC Taipei – 2022

== Switzerland ==
- Philipp Marda – Royal Blues, Taipei Red Lions – 2018–2019

== Turkey ==
- Ertuğrul Bastug – Tatung – 2025
- Kerem Kerimoğlu – Taipei Red Lions – 2019

== Turks and Caicos Islands ==
- Marc Fenelus – Tatung, Tainan City TSG – 2017–2023

== Ukraine ==
- Yaroslav Silaev – Royal Blues, Tatung – 2017–2019

== United States ==
- **Edison Castro** – **Taichung Futuro** – 2026–
- Luke Deming – Royal Blues, Taipei Red Lions, Tatung – 2017–2022
- Jackson Etheridge – Ming Chuan University – 2026
- Clovis Fahn – Tatung – 2026
- Alan Murray – Royal Blues – 2017
- Michael O'Gorman – Royal Blues, Hang Yuan – 2017–2021

== Uzbekistan ==
- Vladislav Nuriev – CPC Corporation, AC Taipei – 2021, 2022
- Ahkrorbek Uktamov – Tainan City TSG – 2022

== Venezuela ==
- Adrian Espinal – Royal Blues, Taicheng Lions – 2017–2018

== Vietnam ==
- Nguyễn Túy Hải – Hang Yuan – 2018

== See also ==
- List of foreign Taiwan Mulan Football League players

== Notes ==
1. Capped for the Chinese Taipei national football team
2. Capped for the Guatemala national football team
3. Capped for the Guatemala national under-20 football team
4. Capped for the Guatemala national under-17 football team
5. Capped for the Haiti national football team
6. Capped for the Haiti national under-23 football team
7. Capped for the Haiti national under-20 football team
8. Capped for the Haiti national under-17 football team
9. Capped for the Haiti national under-15 football team
10. Capped for the Hong Kong national football team
11. Capped for the Hong Kong national under-23 football team
12. Capped for the Hong Kong national under-20 football team
13. Capped for the Japan national football team
14. Capped for the Japan national under-23 football team
15. Capped for the Japan national under-20 football team
16. Capped for the Japan national under-17 football team
17. Capped for the Kenya national under-23 football team
18. Capped for the Kenya national under-20 football team
19. Capped for the Moldova national under-19 football team
20. Capped for the Moldova national under-17 football team
21. Capped for the Moldova national under-15 football team
22. Capped for the Mongolia national football team
23. Capped for the Mongolia national under-23 football team
24. Capped for the Senegal national football team
25. Capped for the South Korea national under-17 football team
26. Capped for the Turks and Caicos Islands national football team
