= 2022 Taiwan Football Premier League =

Taiwan Football Premier League
- Season: 2022
- Dates: 17 April – 27 November
- Champions: Tainan City
- Matches: 63
- Goals: 200 (3.17 per match)
- Top goalscorer: Marco Fenelus (19 goals)
- Biggest home win: Tainan City 5−0 Ming Chuan
- Biggest away win: AC Taipei 2−6 Tainan City
- Highest scoring: AC Taipei 2−6 Tainan City; Taipower 5–3 Leopard Cat
- Longest winning run: Tainan City (6 matches; from October 23, 2022 to 20 November 27, 2022)
- Longest unbeaten run: Taichung FUTURO (16 matches; from April 17, 2022 to November 13, 2022)
- Longest winless run: Ming Chuan (16 matches; from April 17, 2022 to November 06, 2022)
- Longest losing run: Ming Chuan (9 matches; from April 17, 2022 to August 14, 2022)
- All statistics correct as of 27 November 2022.

The 2022 season of the Taiwan Football Premier League is the sixth season of the top-flight association football competition in Taiwan under its current format. The season began on 17 April 2022.

== Teams ==
The 2022 season of the TFPL was initially planned to feature eight teams, but CPC Corporation withdrew from it. They had finished sixth in the 2021 season , so they were granted permission to continue in the top-flight, but they declined it by withdrawing from the league system during the 2022 season. Tainan City are the defending champions, having won the 2021 season title . AC Taipei and Ming Chuan University , respectively champions and runners-up from the Challenge League , were the promoted teams for the new season.

The seven participating teams on this edition of the TFPL are:

- AC Taipei (AC台北; AC táiběi)
- Hang Yuen (航源; Háng yuán)
- Ming Chuan (銘傳大學; Míng chuán dàxué)
- Taichung FUTURO (台中 FUTURO; Táizhōng FUTURO)
- Taiwan Steel (台灣鋼鐵; Táiwān gāngtiě)
- Taipower (高市台電; Gāo shì táidiàn)
- Leopard Cat (台灣石虎足球隊; Táiwān shí hǔ zúqiú duì)
Locations of the 2022 Taiwan Football Premier League teams

Team	Location	Stadium	Capacity	Head coach	Last season
AC Taipei	Taipei	Ming Chuan University Campus Football Field	5,000	Chen Sing-An	2nd division champions
Hang Yuen	New Taipei	Fu Jen Catholic University Football Field	3,000	Hung Chin-Hwai	4th
Leopard Cat	Taipei	Taipei Municipal Stadium	20,000	Chiang Mu-Tsai	5th
Ming Chuan	Taoyuan City	Ming Chuan University Campus Football Field	5,000	Tseng Tai-lin	2nd division runners-up
Taichung FUTURO	Taichung	Taichung Taiyuan Football Pitch	600	Vom Ca-Nhum	3rd
Tainan City	Tainan	Tainan Football Field	15,000	Lo Chih-Tsung	1st
Taipower	Kaohsiung	Kaohsiung National Stadium	55,000	Chen Kuei-Jen	2nd

== League table ==
Pos	Team	Pld	W	D	L	GF	GA	GD	Pts	Qualification or relegation
1	Taiwan Steel (C)	18	11	5	2	47	19	+28	38	Qualification for the AFC Cup group stage
2	Taichung FUTURO	18	10	7	1	36	11	+25	37	Qualification for the AFC Cup qualifying play-off
3	Taipower	18	8	7	3	25	18	+7	31	
4	Hang Yuen	18	8	5	5	37	30	+7	29	
5	Leopard Cat	18	6	6	6	23	26	−3	24	
6	AC Taipei	18	1	4	13	21	51	−30	7	
7	Ming Chuan	18	1	2	15	11	45	−34	5	Qualification for the Taiwan Challenge League relegation play-off
8	CPC Corporation	0	0	0	0	0	0	0	0	Withdrew from league system (Note: CPC Corporation withdrew from the tournament before its start, citing an internal business strategy as a reason. They will not compete in any of Taiwan's league system in 2022.)

Updated to match(es) played on 27 November 2022. Source: CTFA
Rules for classification: 1) Points; 2) Head-to-Head points; 3) Head-to-Head goal difference; 4) Head-to-Head goals scored; 5) Goal difference; 6) Goals scored
(C) Champions

== Results ==
Each team plays a total of 18 games, playing the other teams three times.

=== First 7 rounds ===
Home \ Away	ACT	HAY	LEO	MCU	TAF	TAP	TNC
AC Taipei	—	1–2	0–2	2–1	1–5	-	2–6
Hang Yuen	-	—	1–1	4–2	0–0	1–1	-
Leopard Cat	-	-	—	2–1	-	-	-
Ming Chuan	-	-	-	—	-	0–1	-
Taichung FUTURO	-	-	1–1	4–0	—		0–0
Taipower	4–1	-	0–1	-	0–0	—	-
Tainan City	-	3–1	2–0	5–0	-	1–2	—

Updated to match(es) played on 3 July 2022. Source: CTFA
Legend: Blue = home team win; Yellow = draw; Red = away team win.

=== Middle 7 rounds ===
Home \ Away	ACT	HAY	LEO	MCU	TAF	TAP	TNC
AC Taipei	—	-	2–2	1–1	-	0–1	-
Hang Yuen F.C.	3–1	—	3–1	-	-	-	2–2
Leopard Cat F.C.	-	-	—	-	-	-	-
Ming Chuan F.C.	-	1–4	0–0	—	0–1	-	1–4
Taichung FUTURO F.C.	3–3	4–2	3–0	-	—	2–2	-
Taipower F.C.	-	0–2	5–3	3–1	-	—	2–2
Taiwan Steel F.C.	0–0	-	2–2	-	0–3	-	—

Updated to match(es) played on 9 October 2022. Source: CTFA
Legend: Blue = home team win; Yellow = draw; Red = away team win.

=== Last 7 rounds ===
Home \ Away	ACT	HAY	LEO	MCU	TAF	TAP	TNC
AC Taipei F.C.	—		1–2		1–2		0–7
Hang Yuen F.C.	4–2	—	0–2	4–0	1–5	1–1	2–3
Leopard Cat F.C.			—		1–2		0–1
Ming Chuan F.C.	2–0		1–2	—	0–3	0–2	0–3
Taichung FUTURO F.C.					—		
Taipower F.C.	2–1				0–0	—	
Taiwan Steel F.C.			1–1		1–0	3–0	—

Updated to match(es) played on 27 November 2022. Source: CTFA
Legend: Blue = home team win; Yellow = draw; Red = away team win.

== Promotion/relegation play-off ==
At the end of the season, the seventh-placed team from the TFPL, will enter a single-leg play-off match with the 2022 Taiwan Football Challenge League runner-up for a spot in the 2023 Taiwan Football Premier League.

== Statistics ==
=== Top scorers ===
Rank	Player	Club	Goals
1	Marco Fenelus	Tainan City	19
2	Benchy Estama	Taichung FUTURO	18
3	Joo Ik-seong	Hang Yuen	14
4	Ange Kouamé	Tainan City	11
5	Huang Sheng-Chieh	AC Taipei	6

=== Most goals in a single match ===
Rank	Player	Opponent scored in & Match date	Goals
1	Marco Fenelus	for Tainan City vs AC Taipei (23 October)	3
1	Benchy Estama	for Taichung FUTURO vs AC Taipei (01 May)	3
1	(Chinese Taipei) Lee Hsiang-wei	for Taipower vs Leopard Cat (14 August)	3

=== Clean sheets ===
Rank	Player	Club	Clean sheets
1	(Chinese Taipei) Pan Wen-chieh	Taichung FUTURO	9
2	(Chinese Taipei) Chiu Yu-hung	Taipower	4
2	Shih Shin-an	Leopard Cat	4
4	Lai Po-lun	Hang Yuen	2
4	Lee Kuan-pei	Tainan City	2

== Taiwan Football Challenge League ==
A relegation play-off was held on 7 May to determine if the last-placed teams in the 2021 edition of the Challenge League (FC.BASE Athletic and FC Kaohsiung) should play in the 2022 Challenge League, as two other teams ( AC Taipei reserve team and EC DESAFIO Taipei) submitted their entry request for the Challenge League. A draw was conducted with the last-placed teams included at the "Pot 1", and with the potential new entries included at the "Pot 2". After the draw was held, the teams waited until 7 May to determine who would have the last entries to the Challenge League. The results are as follows:

- **FC Kaohsiung** 2−0 AC Taipei Reserves
- **FC.BASE Athletic** 1−0 EC DESAFIO Taipei

Teams highlighted in bold earned a spot at the 2022 Challenge League, which started on 11 June 2022.

Pos	Team	Pld	W	D	L	GF	GA	GD	Pts	Qualification or relegation
1	Flight Skywalkers FC (C, P)	14	12	2	0	64	4	+60	38	Promotion to Taiwan Football Premier League
2	Land Home NTUS (Q)	14	11	2	1	52	12	+40	35	Qualification for promotion/relegation play-off
3	MARS FC	14	10	0	4	31	24	+7	30	
4	Inter Taoyuan FC	14	8	1	5	33	20	+13	25	
5	PlayOne Normal University	14	4	0	10	15	55	−40	12	
6	Saturday Football International	14	3	0	11	25	49	−24	9	
7	FC Kaohsiung	14	2	2	10	15	47	−32	8	Possible Qualification for Relegation play-out
8	FC Base Athletic (Q)	14	2	1	11	13	37	−24	7	Possible Qualification for Relegation play-out

Updated to match(es) played on 27 November 2022. Source: CTFA
Rules for classification: 1) Points; 2) Head-to-Head points; 3) Head-to-Head goal difference; 4) Head-to-Head goals scored; 5) Goal difference; 6) Goals scored
(C) Champions; (P) Promoted; (Q) Qualified for the phase indicated
