= 2018 Taiwan Football Premier League =

Taiwan Football Premier League
- Season: 2018
- Champions: Tatung (2nd title)
- AFC Cup: Hang Yuen
- Top goalscorer: Marc Fenelus (27 goals)
- All statistics correct as of 9 October 2018.

The 2018 season of the Taiwan Football Premier League (TFPL) is the second season of top-flight association football competition in Taiwan under its current format. The Taiwan Football Premier League includes eight teams. The season began in April 2018. Tatung FC finished at the top of the table, with that result, Tatung FC won the League and earned an automatic berth in the 2018 AFC Cup. However, Hang Yuen was granted the AFC Cup berth after the champions declined the AFC invitation in order to focus on next season.

== Teams ==
The eight league teams are:

- F.C. Taicheng Lions
- Hang Yuen F.C.
- Hasus TSU F.C.
- National Sports Training Center F.C.
- Royal Blues F.C.
- Tainan City F.C.
- Tatung F.C.
- Taipower F.C.

== Qualification ==
Four teams entered the qualification stages of the tournament to play in the 2018 season of the TFPL. These teams were Ming Chuan University, Tainan City, Taicheng Lions and Bear Bro Ilan. Ming Chuan University and Tainan City were at the bottom of the chart in 2017. FC Taicheng and Bear Bro Ilan were new entrants in 2018.

The games took place on January 27–29, 2018. Taicheng Lions and Tainan City finished first and second in the group, qualifying them for the league season.

Pos	Team	Pld	W	D	L	GF	GA	GD	Pts	Qualification
1	Tainan City F.C. (Q)	3	2	1	0	9	2	+7	7	Qualification to 2018 Taiwan Football Premier League
2	F.C. Taicheng Lions (Q)	3	2	0	1	21	3	+18	6	Qualification to 2018 Taiwan Football Premier League
3	Ming Chuan University F.C.	3	1	1	1	5	3	+2	4	
4	Bear Bro Ilan F.C.	3	0	0	3	1	28	−27	0	

Source: Worldfootball
(Q) Qualified for the phase indicated

== League table ==
The season began on April 15, 2018

Pos	Team	Pld	W	D	L	GF	GA	GD	Pts	Qualification or relegation
1	Tatung F.C.	21	17	3	1	75	14	+61	54	
2	Taipower F.C.	21	13	5	3	51	16	+35	44	
3	Hang Yuen F.C.	21	11	5	5	42	22	+20	38	Qualification to AFC Cup group stage
4	Hasus TSU F.C.	21	8	5	8	49	38	+11	29	
5	Tainan City F.C.	21	9	2	10	45	48	−3	29	
6	F.C. Taicheng Lions	21	8	2	11	43	51	−8	26	
7	Royal Blues F.C.	21	5	3	13	25	65	−40	18	Relegated
8	National Sports Training Center F.C.	21	0	1	20	11	87	−76	1	Relegated

Updated to match(es) played on 8 October 2018. Source: CTFA
Rules for classification: 1) Points; 2) Goal difference; 3) Goals scored.

== Top scorers ==
As of 9 October 2018

Rank	Player	Club	Goals
1	(Turks and Caicos Islands) Marc Fenelus	Tatung F.C.	27
2	(Chinese Taipei) Chen Rui-Chieh	Tatung F.C.	13
3	(Honduras) Javier Funes Guzman	F.C. Taicheng Lions	12
3	(Chinese Taipei) Yu Chia-Huang	Hang Yuen F.C.	12
5	(Burkina Faso) Ben Ouedraogo	F.C. Taicheng Lions	11
5	(Chinese Taipei) Chou Cheng	Hasus TSU F.C.	11
5	(Chinese Taipei) Lin Cheng-Yu	Hasus TSU F.C.	10
8	(Chinese Taipei) Huang Chun-Wen	Tainan City F.C.	9
8	(Ivory Coast) Ange Kouamé	Tatung F.C.	9
10	(Chinese Taipei) Chu En-Le	Tatung F.C.	8
10	(Chinese Taipei) Tseng Chi-Wei	Taipower F.C.	8
10	(Chinese Taipei) Chen Hong-Wei	Hasus TSU F.C.	8
