= 2020 Taiwan Football Premier League =

Taiwan Football Premier League
- Season: 2020
- Champions: Taiwan Steel
- Relegated: Ming Chuan
- AFC Cup: Taiwan Steel; Tatung
- Matches: 80
- Goals: 258 (3.23 per match)
- Biggest home win: Taiwan Steel 9–2 Taipower (27 September 2020)
- Biggest away win: Red Lions FC 1–6 Taipower (3 May 2020)
- Highest scoring: Taiwan Steel 9–2 Taipower (27 September 2020)
- Longest winning run: Taiwan Steel (12 matches)
- Longest unbeaten run: Taiwan Steel (12 matches)
- Longest winless run: Ming Chuan (15 matches)
- Longest losing run: Ming Chuan (9 matches)
- All statistics correct as of 17 December 2020.

The 2020 season of the Taiwan Football Premier League is the fourth season of top-flight association football competition in Taiwan under its current format. The Taiwan Football Premier League includes eight teams. The season began on 12 April 2020.

Being one of only six football leagues underway in the world as of early May 2020 (along with Belarus, South Korea, Turkmenistan, Burundi and Nicaragua), the TFPL received greater international exposure because other leagues, such as the Premier League in England, La Liga in Spain, and Serie A in Italy, remained severely impacted by the COVID-19 pandemic and were unable to continue their seasons until several weeks later.

Due to the COVID-19 pandemic, no fans were allowed to attend the first round of the competition.

After two round-robins, ended on August 8, Taipower, Taiwan Steel and Taichung Futuro have mathematically secured their places in the 2021 Taiwan Football Premier League. Hang Yuen has ensured that they will not be regulated directly.

After round 15, Taiwan Steel win against Ming Chuan, Hang Yuen has mathematically secured their places in the 2021 Taiwan Football Premier League and Tatung has ensured that they will not be regulated directly from the later round.

After round 17, Tatung has mathematically secured their places in the 2021 Taiwan Football Premier League and NTUS has ensured that they will not be regulated directly with their winning to Ming Chuan.

From the following round after round 18, NTUS has ensured that they will not be regulated with Taipower win against Red Lions FC.

With an essential win against Ming Chuan, Red Lions FC will be playing in the relegation play-off game against 2nd Div's 2nd place Inter Taoyuan. While Ming Chuan are going down to the 2nd Div next year.

Taiwan Steel are crowned Taiwanese Champion on the 20th round after a 3–1 against Hang Yuen to ensure Taipower couldn't catch them in the title race. It is Taiwan Steel's 1st champion in their history.

== Teams ==
A total of eight teams compete in the league. Tatung are the defending champions.

- Hang Yuen (航源)
- Ming Chuan (銘傳大學)
- NTUS (璉紅臺體)
- Red Lions FC (紅獅FC)
- Taichung Futuro (台中 FUTURO)
- Taiwan Steel (台灣鋼鐵)
- Taipower (高市台電)
- Tatung (北市大同)
Locations of the 2020 Taiwan Football Premier League teams

Team	Location	Stadium	Capacity	Head coach	Last season
Hang Yuen	New Taipei	Fu Jen Catholic University Football Field	3,000	Hung Ching-Hwai	3rd
Ming Chuan	Taoyuan City	Ming Chuan University		Tseng Tai-Lin	7th
NTUS	Taichung	Taichung Taiyuan Football Pitch	500	Chao Jung-jui	6th
Red Lions FC	Taipei	Taipei Municipal Stadium	20,000	Chang Wu-Yeh	8th
Taichung Futuro	Taichung	Taichung Taiyuan Football Pitch	500	Vom Ca-nhum	5th
Taiwan Steel	Tainan	Tainan Football Field	15,000	Luo Chi-Cong	4th
Taipower	Kaohsiung	Kaohsiung National Stadium	55,000	Chen Kuei-jen	2nd
Tatung	Taipei	Taipei Municipal Stadium	20,000	Chiang Mu-tsai	1st

== League table ==
Pos	Team	Pld	W	D	L	GF	GA	GD	Pts	Qualification or relegation
1	Taiwan Steel (C)	21	16	0	5	58	26	+32	48	Qualification for the 2021 AFC Cup group stage
2	Taipower	21	14	4	3	41	27	+14	46	(Note: Taipower and Taichung Futuro, the league runners-up and third place, were not granted an AFC Cup license. As a result, Tatung, the league fourth place and the next highest team granted an AFC Cup license, qualify for the 2021 AFC Cup as Chinese Taipei 2.)
3	Taichung Futuro	21	12	3	6	33	17	+16	39	(Note: Taipower and Taichung Futuro, the league runners-up and third place, were not granted an AFC Cup license. As a result, Tatung, the league fourth place and the next highest team granted an AFC Cup license, qualify for the 2021 AFC Cup as Chinese Taipei 2.)
4	Tatung (Q)	21	12	2	7	47	24	+23	38	
5	Hang Yuen	21	9	6	6	24	20	+4	33	
6	NTUS	21	6	2	13	27	50	−23	20	
7	Red Lions FC (O)	21	2	3	16	19	58	−39	9	Qualification for the Taiwan First Division relegation play-off
8	Ming Chuan (W)	21	2	2	17	21	48	−27	8	Withdrew from league system (Note: Ming Chuan decided not to participate in next season's Taiwan Second Division Football League following the relegation.)

Updated to match(es) played on 29 November 2020. Source: CTFA
Rules for classification: 1) Points; 2) Head-to-Head points; 3) Head-to-Head goal difference; 4) Head-to-Head goals scored; 5) Goal difference; 6) Goals scored
(C) Champions; (O) Play-off winners; (Q) Qualified for the phase indicated; (W) Withdrawn
Notes:
- Tatung v Hang Yuen draw was changed to 3:0 win for Tatung due to Hang Yuen using too many foreign players, original result was 2:2

== Results ==
Each team plays a total of 21 games, playing the others three times.

=== Results 1–14 ===
Home \ Away	HAY	MCU	NTU	RED	TAF	TNC	TAP	TAT
Hang Yuen	—	1–0	2–0	4–0	1–1	0–1	0–0	1–0
Ming Chuan	0–2	—	0–6	6–0	0–1	2–4	0–2	1–4
NTUS	2–3	2–2	—	1–0	2–3	1–4	2–1	1–7
Red Lions FC	0–0	1–1	0–2	—	1–3	0–1	1–6	2–0
Taichung Futuro	0–0	1–0	2–1	4–0	—	0–1	0–0	2–2
Taiwan Steel	0–1	3–2	4–0	3–2	0–1	—	0–1	3–1
Taipower	0–0	3–0	2–0	5–4	2–3	3–2	—	1–0
Tatung	3–0*	1–0	5–1	4–0	1–0	2–3	2–3	—

Updated to match(es) played on 2 August 2020. Source: Soccerway
Legend: Blue = home team win; Yellow = draw; Red = away team win.

=== Results 15–21 ===
Home \ Away	HAY	MCU	NTU	RED	TAF	TNC	TAP	TAT
Hang Yuen	—		1–0	2–2	0–1	1–3	1–3	1–1
Ming Chuan	2–3	—	0–2	0–3	1–0	1–4		1–2
NTUS			—			1–1		
Red Lions FC			1–2	—				
Taichung Futuro			4–0	4–0	—			1–2
Taiwan Steel			5–0	5–2	2–1	—	9–2	
Taipower		3–2		1–0	1–0		—	1–0
Tatung			3–1	4–0		3–1		—

Updated to match(es) played on 2 August 2020. Source: Soccerway
Legend: Blue = home team win; Yellow = draw; Red = away team win.

- Tatung v Hang Yuen draw was awarded a 3–0 win for Tatung due to Hang Yuen using too many foreign players, original result was 2–2.

== Promotion/relegation play-off ==
At the end of the season, the eighth-placed team from the TFPL, Red Lions, entered a play-off with Inter Taoyuan, the second-placed team from the 2020 Taiwan Football Challenge League for a spot in the 2021 Taiwan Football Premier League.

13 December 2020
14:00 NST

Red Lions	0–0	Inter Taoyuan
Penalties
	4–2

== Statistics ==
=== Top scorers ===
Rank	Player	Club	Goals
1	(Ivory Coast) Ange Samuel	Tatung	20
2	(South Korea) Joo Ik-seong	Taichung Futuro	19
2	(Turks and Caicos Islands) Marc Fenelus	Taiwan Steel	19
4	(Haiti) Benchy Estama	Taiwan Steel	16
5	(Chinese Taipei) Lee Hsiang-wei	Taipower	12
