= 2017 Taiwan Football Premier League =

Taiwan Football Premier League
- Season: 2017
- Champions: Tatung
- AFC Cup: Hang Yuen
- Matches: 112
- Goals: 454 (4.05 per match)
- Top goalscorer: Marc Fenelus(35)
- Biggest home win: Taipower 11–0 National Sports Training Center (20 September 2017)
- Biggest away win: Tainan City 0–12 Royal Blues (1 April 2017)
- Highest scoring: Tainan City 0–12 Royal Blues (1 April 2017)
- Longest winning run: 9 - Taipower
- Longest unbeaten run: 23 - Taipower
- Longest winless run: 18 - Tainan City
- Longest losing run: 15 - Tainan City
- All statistics correct as of 2 November 2017.

The 2017 Taiwan Football Premier League (TFPL) was the first season of the Taiwan Football Premier League since it replaced the Intercity Football League following the 2016 season. It was contested by 8 clubs. Taichung City Dragon, who participated in the final Intercity Football League season, were replaced for the inaugural TFPL by Tainan City. Taipower FC finished at the top of the table, but were defeated 1-1 on away goals in a playoff by Tatung FC, the second ranked team, for the title. With that result, Tatung FC earned an automatic berth in the 2018 AFC Cup group stage, while Taipower FC qualified for the playoff round. However, neither side chose to enter the tournament, so 3rd place playoff winners Hang Yuen were granted the AFC Cup berth.

== Teams ==
- Hang Yuen FC (represented by Fu Jen Catholic University)
- Ming Chuan University
- National Sports Training Center
- Hasus TSU
- Royal Blues FC
- Taipower FC
- Tatung FC
- Tainan City FC

== Table ==
Pos	Team	Pld	W	D	L	GF	GA	GD	Pts	Qualification or relegation
1	Taipower	28	21	5	2	96	19	+77	68	Qualification for title playoff final
2	Tatung (C)	28	21	3	4	87	32	+55	66	Qualification for title playoff final
3	Hasus TSU	28	13	6	9	43	36	+7	45	Qualification for third place playoff
4	Hang Yuen (O)	28	11	6	11	55	60	−5	39	Qualification for third place playoff
5	National Sports Training Center	28	11	5	12	47	55	−8	38	
6	Royal Blues	28	9	4	15	55	63	−8	31	
7	Ming Chuan University	28	5	5	18	43	82	−39	20	
8	Tainan City	28	2	4	22	28	110	−82	10	

Updated to match(es) played on 1 November 2017. Source: CTFA
Rules for classification: 1) Points; 2) Goal difference; 3) Goals scored.
(C) Champions; (O) Play-off winners

== Playoff round ==
=== 3rd Place Playoff ===
Summary

Team 1	Agg.	Team 2	1st Leg	2nd Leg
Hang Yuen	5–2	Hasus TSU	2–0	3–2 (a.e.t.)

Matches

18 November 2017
14:30 UTC+8

Hasus TSU	0–2	Hang Yuen
		Xu Wei 22'; Zhou Yu-jie 67'

Kaohsiung National Stadium

25 November 2017
16:00 UTC+8

Hang Yuen	3–2 (a.e.t.)	Hasus TSU
Zhou Yu-jie 54', 70' (pen.); Liu Yong-sheng 112'		Li Zhen-yu 43'; Li Mao 58'

Taipei Municipal Stadium

Hang Yuen won 5–2 on aggregate

=== Final ===
The two top placed teams in the division compete in a play-off to determine the league champions. The winners qualify for the AFC Cup Group stage, while the losers will play in the AFC Cup Qualification play-off preliminary round 2.

Summary

Team 1	Agg.	Team 2	1st Leg	2nd Leg
Tatung FC	1–1 (a)	Taipower FC	1–1	0–0

Matches

18 November 2017
19:30 UTC+8

Taipower FC	1–1	Tatung FC
Lin Chien-hsun 22' (pen.)		Chen Wei-ren 76'

Kaohsiung National Stadium

25 November 2017
19:00 UTC+8

Tatung FC	0–0	Taipower FC

Tatung FC

1-1 on aggregate, Tatung FC won on away goals.

== Top scorers ==
Rank	Player	Club	Goals
1	(Turks and Caicos Islands) Marc Fenelus	Tatung	35
2	(Taiwan) Chiu I-huan	Taipower	20
3	(Honduras) Javi Fines	Royal Blues	19
4	(Taiwan) Wei Mao-ting	Hang Yuen	17
5	(Taiwan) Lin Chien-hsun	Taipower	13
6	(Taiwan) Cheng Qing-yu	NSTC / Hang Yuen	12
7	(Taiwan) Hung Kai-chun	Taipower	11
8	(Taiwan) Tseng Chih-wei	Taipower	9
8	(Taiwan) Li Xiang-wei	Hasus TSU	9
8	(Ukraine) Yaroslav Silaev	Royal Blues	9
