= 2019 Taiwan Football Premier League =

Taiwan Football Premier League
- Season: 2019
- Champions: Tatung
- Relegated: Ming Chuan U. Taipei Red Lions
- Matches: 84
- Goals: 330 (3.93 per match)
- Top goalscorer: Benchy Estama (25 goals)

The 2019 season of the Taiwan Football Premier League (TFPL) is the third season of top-flight association football competition in Taiwan under its current format. The Taiwan Football Premier League includes eight teams. The season began on 14 April 2019.

== Teams ==
A total of eight teams compete in the league. Tatung are the defending champions. Royal Blues and NSTC F.C. were relegated from last season, and were replaced by Taichung Futuro and Ming Chuan University, which were the top two teams of the qualifying tournament held in December 2018.

- F.C. Taipei Red Lions (F.C. 台北紅獅), previously named Taicheng Lions (F.C. 台程獅)
- Hang Yuen F.C. (航源 F.C.)
- Hasus TSU F.C. (台灣體大, previously named 台體光磊 F.C.)
- Ming Chuan University F.C. (銘傳大學 F.C.)
- Taichung Futuro (台中 FUTURO F.C.)
- Taipower F.C. (高市台電 F.C.)
- Tatung F.C. (北市大同 F.C.)
- Taiwan Steel F.C. (台灣鋼鐵 F.C.), previously named Tainan City (台南市 F.C.)

== League table ==
Pos	Team	Pld	W	D	L	GF	GA	GD	Pts	Qualification
1	Tatung	21	16	4	1	75	18	+57	52	Qualification for AFC Cup group stage
2	Taipower	21	15	4	2	47	19	+28	49	Qualification for AFC Cup preliminary round 2
3	Hang Yuan	21	11	8	2	65	31	+34	41	
4	Taiwan Steel	21	10	3	8	43	44	−1	33	
5	Taichung Futuro	21	8	4	9	37	26	+11	28	
6	National Taiwan University of Sport	21	4	3	14	23	59	−36	15	
7	Ming Chuan University	21	3	2	16	20	75	−55	11	Qualification for Relegation play-offs
8	Taipei Red Lions	21	1	4	16	20	58	−38	7	Qualification for Relegation play-offs

Source: CTFA
Rules for classification: 1) Points; 2) Head-to-head points; 3) Head-to-head goal difference; 4) Head-to-head goals scored; 5) Goal difference; 6) Goals scored.

== Results ==
	HNY	MCU	NTU	FUT	TRL	TAT	TPW	TWS
Hang Yuen F.C.	-	3–1; 4–2; 7–0	6–3; 3–0; 4–1	1–1; 2–2; 1–1	5–1; 5–0; 3–1	1–1; 2–2; 2–3	0–0; 3–3; 0–2	2–2; 5–0; 5–4
Ming Chuan University F.C.	1–3; 2–4; 0–7	—	0–2; 3–1; 2–3	0–4; 0–5; 0–5	0–1; 3–1; 1–1	0–8; 1–6; 1–7	0–3; 1–5; 0–3	1–3; 2–2; 2–1
National Taiwan University of Sport F.C.	3–6; 0–3; 1–4	2–0; 1–3; 3–2	—	1–1; 0–3; 0–3	0–0; 3–3; 3–2	2–7; 0–4; 0–3	1–2; 0–3; 0–2	0–3; 3–2; 0–3
Taichung FUTURO F.C.	1–1; 2–2; 1–1	4–0; 5–0; 5–0	1–1; 3–0; 3–0	—	4–0; 1–0; 2–0	0–1; 0–5; 0–1	1–3; 1–2; 0–3	0–1; 2–3; 1–2
F.C. Taipei Red Lions	1–5; 0–5; 1–3	1–0; 1–3; 1–1	0–0; 3–3; 2–3	0–4; 0–1; 0–2	—	1–3; 0–7; 1–1	1–2; 0–3; 1–3	3–4; 1–2; 1–2
Tatung	1–1; 2–2; 3–2	8–0; 6–1; 7–1	7–2; 4–0; 3–0	1–0; 5–0; 1–0	3–1; 7–0; 1–1	—	3–1; 1–1; 2–0	7–1; 2–0; 1–4
Taipower F.C.	0–0; 3–3; 2–0	3–0; 5–1; 3–0	2–1; 3–0; 2–0	3–1; 2–1; 3–0	2–1; 3–0; 3–1	1–3; 1–1; 0–2	—	1–1; 4–3; 1–0
Taiwan Steel F.C.	2–2; 0–5; 4–5	3–1; 2–2; 1–2	3–0; 2–3; 3–0	1–0; 3–2; 2–1	4–3; 2–1; 2–1	1–7; 0–2; 4–1	1–1; 3–4; 0–1	—

source = CTFA

== Top scorers ==
As of 21 August 2019

Rank	Player	Club	Goals
1	(Turks and Caicos Islands) Marc Fenelus	Tatung F.C.	17
2	(Ivory Coast) Ange Kouamé	Tatung F.C.	15
3	(South Korea) Joo Ik-seong	Hang Yuen F.C.	13
4	(Haiti) Benchy Estama	Hang Yuen F.C.	16
5	(Chinese Taipei) Chu En-le	Tatung F.C.	11
6	(Chinese Taipei) Chen Rei-chieh	Tatung F.C.	8
6	(Chinese Taipei) Chiu Yi-huan	Taipower F.C.	8
8	(Chinese Taipei) Lin Chien-hsun	Taipower F.C.	7
9	(Chinese Taipei) Lee Mao	Taichung Futuro F.C.	5
9	(Chinese Taipei) Chen Sheng-wei	Taichung Futuro F.C.	5
9	(Chinese Taipei) Kuo Po-wei	Taiwan Steel F.C.	5
