= 2021 Taiwan Football Premier League =

Taiwan Football Premier League
- Champions: Tainan City F.C.
- Relegated: Hasus TSU F.C. Flight Skywalkers F.C.
- AFC Cup: Tainan City F.C.
- Top goalscorer: Marco Fenelus (11 goals)
- Longest winning run: Taiwan Steel FC (6 matches)
- Longest unbeaten run: Taipower FC (13 matches)
- Longest winless run: Land Home NTUS FC (10 matches)
- Longest losing run: Land Home NTUS FC (9 matches)

The 2021 season of the Taiwan Football Premier League was the fifth season of top-flight association football competition in Taiwan under its current format. The Taiwan Football Premier League includes eight teams. The season began on 11 April 2021.

== Teams ==
A total of eight teams compete in the league. Taiwan Steel are the defending champions. Ming Chuan were relegated at the end of the 2020 season, to be replaced by inaugural Challenge League champions CPC Corporation. Red Lions were taken over in late 2020 and left the league, relaunching as a new entity called Flight Skywalkers.

- CPC Corporation (台灣中油足球隊)
- Flight Skywalkers (台北展逸天行者)
- Hang Yuen (航源)
- Land Home NTUS (璉紅臺體)
- Taipower (高市台電)
- Tatung (北市大同)
- Taichung FUTURO (台中 FUTURO)
- Taiwan Steel (台灣鋼鐵)
Locations of the 2020 Taiwan Football Premier League teams

Team	Location	Stadium	Capacity	Head coach	Last season
CPC Corporation	Kaohsiung			(Taiwan) Zhong Jian-wu	1st, TFCL
Flight Skywalkers	Taipei	Taipei Municipal Stadium	20,000	(Taiwan) Chang Wu-yeh	7th (replaced Red Lions)
Hang Yuen	New Taipei	Fu Jen Catholic University Football Field	3,000	(Taiwan) Hung Ching-hwai	5th
NTUS	Taichung	Taichung Taiyuan Football Pitch	500	(Taiwan) Chao Jung-jui	6th
Taipower	Kaohsiung	Kaohsiung National Stadium	55,000	(Taiwan) Chen Kuei-jen	2nd
Tatung	Taipei	Taipei Municipal Stadium	20,000	(Taiwan) Chiang Mu-tsai	4th
Taichung FUTURO	Taichung	Taichung Taiyuan Football Pitch	500	(Taiwan) Vom Ca-nhum	3rd
Taiwan Steel	Tainan	Tainan Football Field	15,000	(Taiwan) Luo Chi-cong	1st

== League table ==
The league was scheduled to be played over 14 rounds as a double round-robin.

Pos	Team	Pld	W	D	L	GF	GA	GD	Pts	Qualification or relegation
1	Taiwan Steel (C, Q)	14	11	1	2	40	12	+28	34	Qualification for the 2022 AFC Cup Group stage
2	Taipower	14	9	4	1	25	6	+19	31	
3	Taichung FUTURO	14	8	2	4	20	11	+9	26	
4	Hang Yuen	14	7	4	3	19	13	+6	25	
5	Tatung	14	5	3	6	20	22	−2	18	
6	CPC Corporation	14	4	2	8	18	24	−6	14	
7	Flight Skywalkers (P, R)	14	1	2	11	2	23	−21	5	Qualification for the promotion/relegation play-off
8	Land Home NTUS (R)	14	1	2	11	8	41	−33	5	Relegation to the Taiwan Second Division

Updated to match(es) played on 22 December 2021. Source: CTFA
Rules for classification: 1) Points; 2) Head-to-Head points; 3) Head-to-Head goal difference; 4) Head-to-Head goals scored; 5) Goal difference; 6) Goals scored
(C) Champions; (P) Relegation playoff; (Q) Qualified for the phase indicated; (R) Relegated

=== Promotion/relegation playoff ===
At the end of the season, the seventh-placed team from the TFPL will enter a play-off with the second-placed team from the 2021 Taiwan Football Challenge League for a spot in the 2022 Taiwan Football Premier League.

== Taiwan Football Challenge League ==
Pos	Team	Pld	W	D	L	GF	GA	GD	Pts	Qualification or relegation
1	AC Taipei (C, P)	14	11	2	1	44	11	+33	35	Promotion to TFPL
2	Ming Chuan (O, P)	14	10	3	1	52	11	+41	33	Qualification for promotion/relegation play-off
3	Saturday Football International	14	9	2	3	42	12	+30	29	
4	Inter Taoyuan FC	14	7	2	5	33	18	+15	23	
5	PlayOne Normal University	14	3	3	8	16	39	−23	12	
6	Tong Jie FC	14	3	2	9	17	40	−23	11	
7	FCBase Athletic	14	2	2	10	17	53	−36	8	Possible Qualification for Relegation play-out
8	FC Kaohsiung	14	2	2	10	16	53	−37	8	Possible Qualification for Relegation play-out

Updated to match(es) played on 19 December 2021. Source: CTFA
Rules for classification: 1) Points; 2) Head-to-Head points; 3) Head-to-Head goal difference; 4) Head-to-Head goals scored; 5) Goal difference; 6) Goals scored
(C) Champions; (O) Play-off winners; (P) Promoted
