= Yugo Ichiyanagi =

Japanese footballer

Yugo Ichiyanagi 一柳 夢吾
Personal information
- Full name: Yugo Ichiyanagi
- Date of birth: 2 April 1985 (age 41)
- Place of birth: Tokyo, Japan
- Height: 1.84 m (6 ft 1/2 in)
- Position: Defender

Team information
- Current team: AC Taipei
- Number: 5

Youth career
- 2001–2003: Tokyo Verdy

Senior career*
Years	Team	Apps	(Gls)
2003–2007	Tokyo Verdy	27	(1)
2005	→ Sagan Tosu (loan)	15	(0)
2008–2010	Vegalta Sendai	42	(2)
2011–2012	Fagiano Okayama	32	(0)
2012	Matsumoto Yamaga FC	0	(0)
2013	FC Ryukyu	24	(2)
2014	Sukhothai		
2015	Phichit		
2016–2018	Thespakusatsu Gunma	32	(0)
2019–2020	Taichung Futuro	39	(1)
2021	Tainan City		
2022–	AC Taipei		
Total		175	(5)
Medal record
Tokyo Verdy
Winner	Emperor's Cup	2004
- * Club domestic league appearances and goals as of 6 June 2022

Yugo Ichiyanagi (一柳 夢吾, Ichiyanagi Yūgo; born 2 April 1985) is a Japanese football player who plays for Taiwanese football club AC Taipei.

== Club statistics ==
Updated to 6 November 2020.

Club performance			League		Cup		League Cup		Continental		Total	
Season	Club	League	Apps	Goals	Apps	Goals	Apps	Goals	Apps	Goals	Apps	Goals
Japan			League		Emperor's Cup		J.League Cup		AFC		Total	
2003	Tokyo Verdy	J1 League	6	1	0	0	0	0	-		6	1
2004	Tokyo Verdy	J1 League	0	0	0	0	0	0	-		0	0
2005	Sagan Tosu	J2 League	15	0	1	0	-		-		16	0
2006	Tokyo Verdy	J2 League	13	0	0	0	-		0	0	13	0
2007	Tokyo Verdy	J2 League	8	0	1	0	-		-		9	0
2008	Vegalta Sendai	J2 League	16	0	2	0	-		-		18	0
2009	Vegalta Sendai	J2 League	18	2	3	0	-		-		21	2
2010	Vegalta Sendai	J1 League	8	0	1	0	1	0	-		10	0
2011	Fagiano Okayama	J2 League	20	0	1	0	-		-		21	0
2012	Fagiano Okayama	J2 League	12	0	-		-		-		12	0
2012	Matsumoto Yamaga	J2 League	0	0	1	0	-		-		1	0
2013	FC Ryukyu	JFL	24	2	0	0	-		-		24	2
2016	Thespakusatsu Gunma	J2 League	15	0	1	0	-		-		16	0
2017	Thespakusatsu Gunma	J2 League	16	0	0	0	-		-		16	0
Taiwan			League		-		-		AFC Cup		Total	
2019	Taichung Futuro	TFPL	?	1	-	-	-		-		?	1
2020	Taichung Futuro	TFPL	18	0	-	-	-		-		18	0
Career total			189	5	11	0	1	0	0	0	201	5
