= 2015–16 Intercity Football League =

Intercity Football League
- Season: 2015–16

The 2015–16 Intercity Football League is the ninth season of the Intercity Football League since its establishment in 2007. The season began on 16 May 2015, and Taiwan Power Company are the defending champions.

== Clubs ==
A total of 11 clubs will contest the league.

== Preliminary stage ==
The preliminary stages were held from May 16 to 18, 2015. All matches are held in Bailing Stadium.

=== Round one ===
Pos	Team	Pld	W	D	L	GF	GA	GD	Pts
1	Taichung City	3	3	0	0	12	6	+6	9
2	Royal Blues	3	1	1	1	10	8	+2	4
3	Inter Taipei FC	3	0	2	1	4	6	−2	2
4	Taipei FC	3	0	1	2	4	10	−6	1

May 16, 2015
15:00

Royal Blues	6 – 2	Taipei FC

Bailing Stadium
May 16, 2015
17:00

Taichung City F.C.	4 – 2	Inter Taipei FC

Bailing Stadium

May 17, 2015
15:00

Royal Blues	1 – 1	Inter Taipei FC

Bailing Stadium
May 17, 2015
17:00

Taipei FC	1 – 3	Taichung City F.C.

Bailing Stadium

May 18, 2015
15:00

Taichung City F.C.	5 – 3	Royal Blues

Bailing Stadium
May 18, 2015
17:00

Inter Taipei FC	1 – 1	Taipei FC

Bailing Stadium

The top two teams qualified to "Round Two".

=== Round two ===
The preliminary stages were held from August 14 to 16, 2015. All matches were held in Yonghua Stadium.

Pos	Team	Pld	W	D	L	GF	GA	GD	Pts
1	Taichung City	2	1	1	0	7	3	+4	4
2	Royal Blues	2	1	1	0	2	1	+1	4
3	Tainan City	2	0	0	2	0	0	0	0

August 14, 2015
19:00

Royal Blues Taipei	1 – 0	Tainan City F.C.

Tainan Municipal Stadium

August 15, 2015
16:00

Royal Blues Taipei	1 – 1	Taichung City F.C

Tainan Municipal Stadium

August 16, 2015
16:00

Taichung City F.C.	6 – 2	Tainan City F.C.

Tainan Municipal Stadium

The top two teams qualified to the Intercity League.

== Final round ==
The winners from Round 2 plus 6 best teams in 2014 season, will compete for the championship.

The league starts at September 13, 2015, and will end on April 23, 2016.

Pos	Team	Pld	W	D	L	GF	GA	GD	Pts	Qualification
1	Taiwan Power Company (C)	14	12	1	1	58	5	+53	37	2017 AFC Cup group stage
2	Taipei City Tatung	14	9	3	2	46	12	+34	30	2017 AFC Cup play-off round
3	NTUPES	14	8	3	3	41	17	+24	27	
4	NSTC	14	8	1	5	39	25	+14	25	
5	Royal Blues F.C.	14	6	2	6	35	26	+9	20	
6	Ming Chuan University	14	5	2	7	23	28	−5	17	
7	Taichung City Dragon (Q)	14	2	0	12	18	73	−55	6	2016–17 Intercity Football League Preliminary Round
8	Air Source Development (Q)	14	0	0	14	11	85	−74	0	2016–17 Intercity Football League Preliminary Round

(C) Champions; (Q) Qualified for the phase indicated

Home \ Away	ASD	MCU	NSTC	TCD	NTUPES	RYB	TCT	TPW
Air Source Development		1–8	3–10	2–4	1–7	0–9	0–6	0–8
Ming Chuan University	4–1		0–3	4–1	0–5	0–2	0–3	0–6
National Sports Training Center	2–1	2–3		6–2	1–6	0–0	1–0	0–4
Taichung City Dragon	2–0	0–2	0–8		0–5	1–3	1–4	0–10
NTUPES	4–0	1–1	0–2	3–2		2–1	2–2	0–2
Royal Blues	5–1	1–0	1–2	8–5	1–4		0–0	1–5
Taipei City Tatung	11–0	1–0	3–2	9–0	2–2	4–2		1–0
Taiwan Power Company	5–1	1–1	2–0	9–0	2–0	2–1	2–0	

Updated to match(es) played on 13 December 2015. Source: Intercity Football League
Legend: Blue = home team win; Yellow = draw; Red = away team win.
