= Usman Diarra =

Indonesian footballer

Personal information
- Full name: Aidil Usman Diarra
- Date of birth: 31 January 1998 (age 28)
- Place of birth: Jakarta, Indonesia
- Height: 1.80 m (5 ft 11 in)
- Position: Forward

Team information
- Current team: Dhaka Wanderers
- Number: 45

Youth career
- –2016: Villa 2000
- 2017–2018: Bhayangkara

Senior career*
Years	Team	Apps	(Gls)
2018	Persikabo Bogor	0	(0)
2018–2019	Persik Kediri	26	(3)
2020–2021	Persikota Tangerang	5	(0)
2021	PSKC Cimahi	3	(0)
2021–2022	Kalteng Putra	4	(0)
2022–2023	Nusantara United	4	(0)
2023	Hang Yuan	4	(0)
2023	Bhayangkara	2	(0)
2023–2024	Kalteng Putra	4	(1)
2025	Persikas Subang	7	(1)
2025–2026	Persipal Palu	7	(0)
2026	Sriwijaya	7	(1)
2026–	Dhaka Wanderers	0	(0)
- * Club domestic league appearances and goals as of 2 May 2026

Aidil Usman Diarra (born 31 January 1998) is an Indonesian professional footballer who plays as a forward for Bangladesh Football League club Dhaka Wanderers.

== Club career ==
Diarra was born in Jakarta on 31 January 1998, he was dubbed the 2020 Indonesian wonderkid after successfully bringing Persik Kediri to win 2018 Liga 3. He is a multifunctional player, can play as a midfielder, winger, second striker and also striker. In August 2020, he joined Persikota Tangerang.

=== PSKC Cimahi ===
In July 2021, Diarra joined Liga 2 club PSKC Cimahi. Diarra made his league debut on 27 September 2021 in a match against Perserang Serang at the Gelora Bung Karno Madya Stadium. He made three league appearances for PSKC Cimahi, without scoring.

=== Kalteng Putra ===
He was signed for other Liga 2 club Kalteng Putra to play in the rest of the 2021–22 season. Diarra made his club debut on 10 November 2021 as a starter in a match against Persewar Waropen at the Batakan Stadium, Balikpapan. In a match against Mitra Kukar on 25 November, he played the full 90 minutes for the first time in a 0–1 lose.

=== Nusantara United ===
He was signed for other Liga 2 club Nusantara United to play in the 2022–23 season. Diarra made his club debut on 30 August 2022 as a substitutes in a match against Persipa Pati. Diarra only played 4 times for the club because Liga 2 was decided to stop halfway and has not been rolled back until now.

=== Hang Yuan ===
In February 2023, he went abroad for the first time and signed a contract with Taiwan Football Premier League side Hang Yuan. Diarra made his league debut on 19 April 2023 as a substituted Gerardo Rabre in a 1–1 draw over Taipei Deva Dragons. He also became the first Indonesian player to play in a Taiwanese professional league when he appeared for Hang Yuan in a Taiwan Football Premier League. Four days later, he picked up his first win with Hang Yuan in his second appearances in a 1–2 away win over AC Taipei.

== Personal life ==
Diarra was born in Jakarta. He has Malian descent from his father, Ibrahim Diarra is Malian, while his mother, Sapta Darlis is Indonesian Minang. His parents decided to separate. His father chose to return to Mali. After that, Diarra decided to return to Solok. He lives in his mother's homeland, West Sumatra.

== Honours ==
=== Club ===
Persik Kediri

- Liga 3: 2018
