= Wang Yi-you =

Taiwanese footballer (born 1999)

Personal information
- Date of birth: 29 November 1999 (age 26)
- Place of birth: Tainan, Taiwan
- Position: Defender

Team information
- Current team: Taichung Rock
- Number: 48

Senior career*
Years	Team	Apps	(Gls)
2019	Tainan City TSG		
2020	SV Genc Osman		
2020–2022	Taipei Dragons		
2022	Tainan City TSG		
2023–2024	SGS Essen		
2024–2025	TuRU Düsseldorf		
2025–2026	Taichung Rock		

International career^{‡}
	Chinese Taipei	1	(0)
- * Club domestic league appearances and goals ‡ National team caps and goals as of 13 November 2026

Wang Yi-you (Chinese: 王義友; born 29 November 1999) is a Taiwanese footballer who plays as a defender for the Chinese Taipei national team.

== Early life ==
Wang was born in 1999 in Taiwan. He attended Taichung Liming Junior High School in Taiwan.

== Club career ==
Wang played for Taiwanese side Tainan City FC. He helped the club win the league. In 2023, he signed for German side SGS Essen. He helped the club win the league.

== International career ==
Wang is a Chinese Taipei international. He played for the Chinese Taipei national under-23 football team at the 2022 Asian Games.

== Style of play ==
Wang mainly operates as a defender. He can also operate as a midfielder.
