= Oliver Gerbig =

Hong Kong footballer

Oliver Gerbig 周緣德
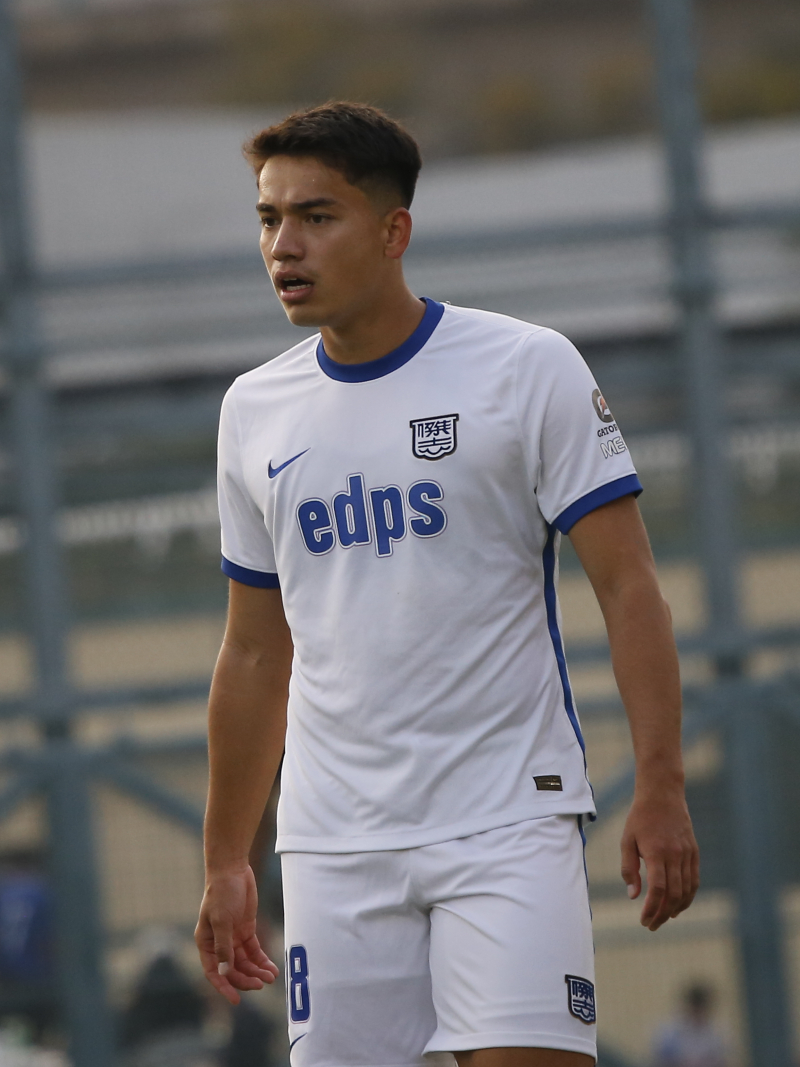

Personal information
- Full name: Oliver Benjamin Gerbig
- Date of birth: 12 December 1998 (age 27)
- Place of birth: Happy Valley, Hong Kong
- Height: 1.88 m (6 ft 2 in)
- Positions: Centre back; right back

Team information
- Current team: Henan
- Number: 3

Youth career
- 2008–2014: Inter Taoyuan

College career
Years	Team	Apps	(Gls)
2018–2020	Coastal Carolina Chanticleers	35	(0)
2020–2021	Virginia Cavaliers	29	(1)

Senior career*
Years	Team	Apps	(Gls)
2014–2018	Royal Blues		
2018	Taipei Red Lions		
2022–2024	Kitchee	27	(1)
2024–	Henan	38	(1)
2024	→ Dalian Yingbo (loan)	7	(0)

International career^{‡}
2017–2018	Hong Kong U20		
2019	Hong Kong U23	1	(0)
2023–	Hong Kong	33	(0)
Medal record
Men's football
Representing Hong Kong
FIFA ASEAN Challenge Cup
Winner	2026 Hong Kong
- * Club domestic league appearances and goals as of 8 November 2026 ‡ National team caps and goals as of 3 October 2026

Oliver Benjamin Gerbig (Chinese: 周緣德; pinyin: Zhōu Yuándé; born 12 December 1998) is a Hong Kong professional footballer who currently plays as a centre back for Chinese Super League club Henan and the Hong Kong national team.

Gerbig has played for Royal Blues and Taipei Red Lions in the Taiwan Football Premier League. In 2018, he began playing NCAA Division I Men's Soccer at Coastal Carolina University in the United States. In 2020, he transferred to the University of Virginia.

== Early career ==
Gerbig began his academy career playing for Inter Taoyuan while simultaneously playing and studying at the Taipei American School.

In April 2015, Gerbig began playing for Royal Blues in Taipei at the age of 16. On his debut, a league match against Taichung City on 1 November 2015, he was substituted in at 41 minutes, and 4 minutes later, he scored his first goal for the club. This goal contributed to Royal Blues winning the game 3–1.

In April 2018, Gerbig joined Taipei Red Lions, but suffered a knee injury after only three months playing for the team.

== College career ==
In July 2018, Gerbig went to the United States to study at Coastal Carolina University and represent the Coastal Carolina Chanticleers in the NCAA Division I. In two years, he appeared in 35 matches as the main centre back. In the second year, he helped the team win the 2019 Sun Belt Conference.

On 29 February 2020, Gerbig announced his transfer to the University of Virginia, where he would represent the Virginia Cavaliers.

== Professional career ==
=== Kitchee ===
On 24 July 2022, Kitchee announced an agreement for Gerbig to join in the 2022–23 season. Gerbig made his professional debut in the AFC Champions League Round of 16 match against BG Pathum United on 19 August 2022.

Gerbig established himself as a first-choice centre back during the 2022–23 season by starting all 18 league matches. He also score twice in a group stage match in the Sapling Cup against Resources Capital on 1 February 2023.

=== Henan ===
After impressive performances during the 2023 AFC Asian Cup group stage matches, Gerbig attracted interest from Chinese clubs. On 29 February 2024, Gerbig joined Chinese Super League club Henan for a transfer fee of RMB $1 million.

==== Dalian Yingbo (loan) ====
On 14 July 2024, Gerbig was loaned to China League One club Dalian Yingbo for the rest of the season.

== International career ==
Gerbig represented Hong Kong U-20 in the 13th National Games of the People’s Republic of China in 2017. In the 2018 Asian Games the following year, although Gerbig was once again selected for the 40-man roster of Hong Kong U-23, he had to sit out on the Asian Games due to injury.

In March 2019, Gerbig was called up again in the 2020 AFC U23 Championship qualifiers and played for the first time against North Korea U-23, where Hong Kong U-23 lost by two goals in the final match.

On 16 November 2023, Gerbig made his international debut for Hong Kong in the World Cup qualifiers against Iran.

On 26 December 2023, Gerbig was named in Hong Kong's squad for the 2023 AFC Asian Cup.

== Career statistics ==
=== International ===
As of 3 October 2026

National team	Year	Apps	Goals
Hong Kong	2023	1	0
Hong Kong	2024	16	0
Hong Kong	2025	11	0
Hong Kong	2026	5	0
Total		33	0

#	Date	Venue	Opponent	Result	Competition
1	16 November 2023	Azadi Stadium, Tehran, Iran	Iran	0–4	2026 FIFA World Cup qualification – AFC second round
2	1 January 2024	Baniyas Stadium, Abu Dhabi, United Arab Emirates	China	2–1	Friendly
3	14 January 2024	Khalifa International Stadium, Al Rayyan, Qatar	United Arab Emirates	1–3	2023 AFC Asian Cup
4	19 January 2024	Khalifa International Stadium, Al Rayyan, Qatar	Iran	0–1	2023 AFC Asian Cup
5	23 January 2024	Abdullah bin Khalifa Stadium, Doha, Qatar	Palestine	0–3	2023 AFC Asian Cup
6	21 March 2024	Mong Kok Stadium, Mong Kok, Hong Kong	Uzbekistan	0–2	2026 FIFA World Cup qualification – AFC second round
7	26 March 2024	Milliy Stadium, Tashkent, Uzbekistan	Uzbekistan	0–3	2026 FIFA World Cup qualification – AFC second round
8	6 June 2024	Hong Kong Stadium, So Kon Po, Hong Kong	Iran	2–4	2026 FIFA World Cup qualification – AFC second round

== Personal life ==
Gerbig was born in Hong Kong. He was born to a German father and Hong Kong mother. Gerbig attended the Discovery Bay International School, where he began playing football. He moved to Taiwan at the age of five.

After moving to Taiwan, Gerbig attended Taipei European School. He transferred to Taipei American School two years later, where he graduated high school in 2017.

== Honours ==
Kitchee

- Hong Kong Premier League: 2022–23
- Hong Kong Senior Challenge Shield: 2022–23, 2023–24
- Hong Kong FA Cup: 2022–23

Hong Kong

- FIFA ASEAN Challenge Cup: 2026
