= Taiwan Football Premier League =

- Founded: 2017; 9 years ago
- Country: Taiwan
- Confederation: AFC
- Number of clubs: 8
- Level on pyramid: 1
- Relegation to: Taiwan Second Division Football League
- Domestic cup: Taiwan President FA Cup
- International cup: AFC Challenge League
- Current champions: Tainan City TSG (6th title) (2025–26)
- Most championships: Tainan City TSG (6 titles)
- Top scorer: (Turks and Caicos Islands) Marc Fenelus (149 goals)
- Broadcaster(s): CTFA TV
- Website: ctfa.com.tw
- Current: 2026–27 Taiwan Football Premier League

The Taiwan Football Premier League (TFPL; Chinese: 台灣企業甲級足球聯賽; pinyin: Táiwān Qǐyè Jiǎ Jí Zúqiú Liánsài) is the top-ranked Taiwanese football league run by the Chinese Taipei Football Association (CTFA).

== History ==
The Taiwan Football Premier League was founded in 2017 after the folding of the then highest-ranked National First Division Football League (Intercity Football League).

During the 2020 COVID-19 pandemic, it was one of the few football leagues in the world to begin and proceed without disruption, due to the relatively light situation in Taiwan compared to most other countries.

== Competition format ==
The Taiwan Football Premier League's schedule usually runs from August to May. It contains 8 teams that compete in a series of three round-robin tournaments, each composed of seven games. After the 21 game schedule is complete, the top team wins the league title and an automatic berth in the following year's AFC Challenge League.

Since 2020, a system of promotion and relegation exists between the Premier League and the Taiwan Second Division Football League . The lowest placed team in the Premier League is relegated to the Second Division, and the top team from the Second Division promoted to the Premier League. The runners-up of the Second Division will play in a qualification tournament with the 7th in the Premier League, which the winner stays in the first Division.

== Teams ==
Teams (2026–27)
Team	Chinese	Based in	Seasons in TFPL	First season in TFPL
Kaohsiung Attackers	高雄先鋒	Kaohsiung City	1	2026–27
New Taipei Hang Yuan	新北航源	New Taipei City	10	2017
Sunny Bank AC Taipei	陽信台北競技	Taipei City	5	2022
Taichung Futuro	台中Futuro	Taichung City	8	2019
Taichung Rock	台中磐石	Taichung City	2	2025–26
Tainan City TSG	南市台鋼	Tainan City	10	2017
Taipower	台灣電力	Kaohsiung City	10	2017
Tatung Taiwan Leopard Cat	大同臺灣石虎	Taipei City	10	2017

=== Former teams ===
- National Sports Training Center (國家儲訓) (2017–2018)
- Royal Blues (皇家蔚藍) (2017–2018)
- Land Home NTUS (璉紅臺體) (2017–2021)
- Red Lions (紅獅) (2018–2020)
- CPC Corporation (台灣中油) (2021)
- Taipei Dragons (臺北龍) (2021, 2023)
- Taipei Vikings (臺北Vikings) (2024)
- Ming Chuan University (銘傳大學) (2017, 2019–2020, 2022–2026)

=== Timeline ===
Current team Former team League 2

== Stadiums ==
Stadiums (2026–27)
Stadium	Chinese	Location	Capacity	Map
Fu Jen Catholic University Stadium	輔仁大學足球場	New Taipei City	3,000	Taiwan Football Premier League is located in Taiwan
Kaohsiung Nanzih Football Stadium	高雄市立楠梓足球場	Kaohsiung City	1,200	Taiwan Football Premier League is located in Taiwan
National Taiwan Sport University Athletic Field	國立體育大學田徑場	Taoyuan City	3,000	Taiwan Football Premier League is located in Taiwan
Taichung Football Sports and Leisure Park Training Pitch	南屯人工草皮練習場	Taichung City		Taiwan Football Premier League is located in Taiwan
Tainan Municipal Football Field	臺南市立足球場	Tainan City	2,000	Taiwan Football Premier League is located in Taiwan
Taipei Municipal Stadium	臺北田徑場	Taipei City	20,000	Taiwan Football Premier League is located in Taiwan
Taiyuan Football Field	太原足球場	Taichung City	600	Taiwan Football Premier League is located in Taiwan
Xitun Football Field	西屯足球場	Taichung City	200	Taiwan Football Premier League is located in Taiwan
Xizhi Sports Field	汐止綜合運動場	New Taipei City	466	Taiwan Football Premier League is located in Taiwan

=== Former stadiums ===
Stadium	Chinese	Location	Capacity
Hsinchu County Second Stadium	新竹縣第二運動場	Hsinchu County	2,500
Ming Chuan University Taoyuan Campus	銘傳大學龜山校區	Taoyuan City	5,000
National Stadium	國家體育場	Kaohsiung City	55,000
National Taipei University	國立臺北大學	New Taipei City	300
National Taiwan Sport University Football Field	國體人工足球場	Taoyuan City	0
National Taiwan University Zhubei Branch Football Field	臺大竹北校區足球場	Hsinchu County	500
National Yilan Senior High School Football Field	宜蘭高中足球場	Yilan County	
Siao-Long Football Stadium	蕭壠足球場	Tainan City	752
Tainan Municipal Stadium	臺南市立體育場	Tainan City	20,000
Tainan Municipal Xinying Stadium	臺南市立新營體育場	Tainan City	30,000
Yilan Sports Park Multipurpose Stadium	宜蘭運動公園複合式運動場	Yilan County	15,000
Yingfeng Riverside Park Football Pitch	迎風河濱公園足球場	Taipei City	100

== Champions ==
Season	Champion	Runner-up	Third place
2017	Tatung	Taipower	Hang Yuan
2018	Tatung	Taipower	Hang Yuan
2019	Tatung	Taipower	Hang Yuan
2020	Tainan City TSG	Taipower	Taichung Futuro
2021	Tainan City TSG	Taipower	Taichung Futuro
2022	Tainan City TSG	Taichung Futuro	Taipower
2023	Tainan City TSG	Leopard Cat	Taipower
2024	Tainan City TSG	Taichung Futuro	New Taipei Hang Yuan
2025–26	Tainan City TSG	New Taipei Hang Yuan	Sunny Bank AC Taipei

=== Performance by clubs ===
Club	Winners	Runners-up	Winning years
Tainan City	6	0	2020 , 2021 , 2022 , 2023 , 2024 , 2025–26
Tatung/ Leopard Cat	3	1	2017 , 2018 , 2019
Taipower	0	5	
Taichung Futuro	0	2	
Hang Yuan	0	1	

== Awards ==
=== Best Player ===
Season	Winner	Team
2019	(Turks and Caicos Islands) Marc Fenelus	Tatung
2020	(Chinese Taipei) Wu Chun-ching	Tainan City
2021	(Chinese Taipei) Wu Chun-ching	Tainan City
2022	(Ivory Coast) Ange Kouamé	Tainan City
2023	(Chinese Taipei) Ange Kouamé	Tainan City
2024	(Chinese Taipei) Chen Wei-Chuan	Tainan City
2025–26	(South Korea) Kim Sung-kyum	Tainan City

=== Golden Boot ===
Season	Winner	Team	Goals
2017	(Turks and Caicos Islands) Marc Fenelus (1)	Tatung	35
2018	(Turks and Caicos Islands) Marc Fenelus (2)	Tatung	27
2019	(Haiti) Benchy Estama	Hang Yuen	25
2020	(Ivory Coast) Ange Kouamé	Tatung	20
2021	(Turks and Caicos Islands) Marc Fenelus (3)	Tainan City	11
2022	(Turks and Caicos Islands) Marc Fenelus (4)	Tainan City	20
2023	(Chinese Taipei) Huang Wei-chieh	AC Taipei	13
2024	(Colombia) Maurício Cortés	Tainan City	13
2025–26	(Chinese Taipei) Kang Tae-won	Hang Yuan	12

=== Golden Glove ===
Season	Winner	Team
2018	(Chinese Taipei) Chiu Yu-Hung	Taipower
2019	(Chinese Taipei) Pan Wen-Chieh (1)	Tatung
2020	(Chinese Taipei) Tuan Yu	Taichung Futuro
2021	(Chinese Taipei) Pan Wen-Chieh (2)	Tainan City
2022	(Chinese Taipei) Pan Wen-Chieh (3)	Taichung Futuro
2023	(Chinese Taipei) Pan Wen-Chieh (4)	Tainan City
2024	(Chinese Taipei) Pan Wen-Chieh (5)	Tainan City
2025–26	(Chinese Taipei) Odo Jacobs	Hang Yuan

=== Best Manager ===
Season	Winner	Team
2017	(Chinese Taipei) Chiang Mu-Tsai (1)	Tatung
2018	(Chinese Taipei) Chiang Mu-Tsai (2)	Tatung
2019	(Chinese Taipei) Chiang Mu-Tsai (3)	Tatung
2020	(Chinese Taipei) Lo Chih-Tsung (1)	Tainan City
2021	(Chinese Taipei) Lo Chih-Tsung (2)	Tainan City
2022	(Chinese Taipei) Lo Chih-Tsung (3)	Tainan City
2023	(Chinese Taipei) Lo Chih-Tsung (4)	Tainan City
2024	(France) Raphaël Blanchon	Tainan City
2025–26	(Spain) Carlos Garcia	Tainan City

=== Fair Play Award ===
Season	Team
2017	NSTC
2018	Tainan City
2019	Tatung
2020	Land Home NTUS
2021	Land Home NTUS

== Multiple hat-tricks ==
Rank	Country	Player	Hat-tricks
1	(Turks and Caicos Islands)	Marc Fenelus	6
2	(Chinese Taipei)	Angel Samuel Kouamé	5
3	(Haiti)	Jhon Miky Benchy Estama	4
4	(South Korea)	Joo Ik-seong	3
5	(Chinese Taipei)	Hsu Fan-shao	2
6	(Chinese Taipei)	Lin Chang-lun	1
6	(Chinese Taipei)	Lin Cheng-hsun	1
6	(Chinese Taipei)	Chu En-le	1
6	(Chinese Taipei)	Lee Hsiang-wei	1
6	(Chinese Taipei)	Chiu I-huan	1
6	(Chinese Taipei)	Li Mao	1
6	(Chinese Taipei)	Chen Po-yu	1
6	(Japan)	Jun Uchida	1
6	(Chinese Taipei)	Huang Wei-chieh	1
6	(Chinese Taipei)	Wu Yen-shi	1
6	(Chinese Taipei)	Z Yicheng	1
6	(Japan)	Shohei Yokoyama	1
6	(Chinese Taipei)	Ko Yu-ting	1

== See also ==
- Intercity Football League
- Enterprise Football League
