= Onur Doğan =

Taiwanese footballer (born 1988)

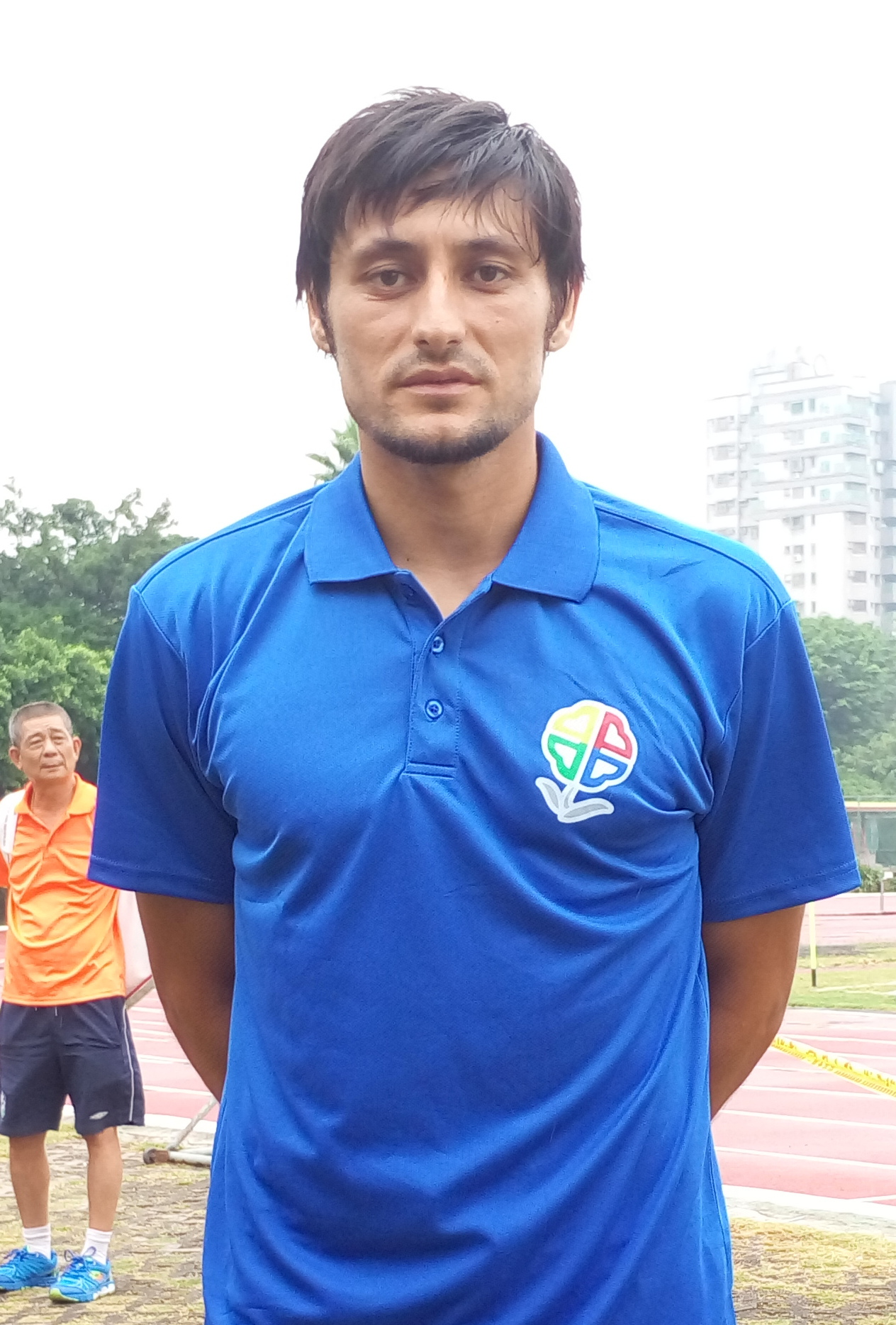
- Doğan in 2015

Personal information
- Date of birth: 8 September 1988 (age 38)
- Place of birth: Çanakkale, Turkey
- Height: 1.83 m (6 ft 0 in)
- Position: Forward

Team information
- Current team: Taichung Futuro
- Number: 77

Youth career
- 1994–2005: Çanakkale Dardanelspor
- 2005-2006: Çanakkalespor
- 2006-2007: Çanakkale Arslancaspor
- 2007-2008: Çanakkale Mahmudiye Belediyespor

Senior career*
Years	Team	Apps	(Gls)
2010–2014	Tatung F.C.	56	(50)
2016–2018	Meizhou Hakka	48	(9)
2018–2020	Tatung F.C.	31	(30)
2020–2022	Taichung Futuro	28	(5)
2023–	Leopard Cat F.C.		

International career^{‡}
2014–	Chinese Taipei	28	(9)
- * Club domestic league appearances and goals as of 11 August 2023 ‡ National team caps and goals as of 6 October 2022

Onur Doğan (born 8 September 1988), also known as Chu En-Le (Traditional Chinese: 朱恩樂), is a footballer who plays as a forward for Taiwan Premier League club Taichung Futuro. Born in Turkey, he plays for the Chinese Taipei national football team.

Doğan was born in Çanakkale but moved to Taiwan in 2009 and was naturalized in 2014. He earned his first call-up to the Chinese Taipei national side, achieving his first cap later that same year, thus becoming the first foreign naturalized footballer to represent Taiwan.

== Biography ==
Doğan's mother discovered his talent in playing football. He started his youth football career when he was seven years old, as a senior player, he has played for Çanakkale Dardanelspor, Çanakkalespor, Çanakkale Arslancaspor and Çanakkale Mahmudiye Belediyespor in the Turkish lower amateur leagues.

=== Career stats ===
As of matches played 6 October 2022

Appearances and goals by club, season and competition
Club	Season	League			Cup		Total	
Club	Season	Division	Apps	Goals	Apps	Goals	Apps	Goals
Tatung FC	2010	Intercity Football League	10	10	—		10	10
Tatung FC	2011	Intercity Football League	14	9	—		14	9
Tatung FC	2012	Intercity Football League	14	10	—		14	10
Tatung FC	2013	Intercity Football League	11	11	—		11	11
Tatung FC	2014	Intercity Football League	7	10	—		7	10
Tatung FC	Total		56	50	—		56	50
Meizhou Hakka	2016	China League One	28	8	2 (Note: Appearances in Chinese FA Cup)	1	30	9
Meizhou Hakka	2017	China League One	20	1	0	0	20	1
Meizhou Hakka	Total		48	9	2	1	50	10
Tatung FC	2018	Taiwan Premier League	13	8	—		13	8
Tatung FC	2019	Taiwan Premier League	18	14	—		18	14
Tatung FC	Total		31	22	—		31	22
Taichung Futuro FC	2020	Taiwan Premier League	13	2	—		13	2
Taichung Futuro FC	2021	Taiwan Premier League	17	3	—		17	3
Taichung Futuro FC	Total		30	5	—		30	5
Career total			165	86	2	1	167	87

== Honours ==
Tatung FC

- Intercity Football League: 2013
- Taiwan Football Premier League: 2018, 2019

== International ==
In 2014, he was naturalized as a Republic of China citizen, and made his international debut against Guam on November 13.

=== International stats ===
Chinese Taipei senior team
Year	Apps	Goals
2014	3	0
2015	3	2
2016	1	0
2017	6	1
2018	7	3
2019	7	0
2020	0	0
2021	0	0
2022	0	0
Total	27	6

=== International goals ===
Scores and results list Chinese Taipei's goal tally first.

Goal	Date	Venue	Opponent	Score	Result	Competition
1.	17 March 2015	Sultan Hassanal Bolkiah Stadium, Bandar Seri Begawan, Brunei	Brunei	2–0	2–0	2018 FIFA World Cup qualification
2.	9 October 2015	Taipei Municipal Stadium, Taipei, Taiwan	Macau	4–1	5–1	Friendly
3.	10 October 2017	Taipei Municipal Stadium, Taipei, Taiwan	Bahrain	2–1	2–1	2019 AFC Asian Cup qualification
4.	7 September 2018	Taipei Municipal Stadium, Taipei, Taiwan	Malaysia	2–0	2–0	Friendly
5.	13 November 2018	Taipei Municipal Stadium, Taipei, Taiwan	Mongolia	1–0	2–1	2019 EAFF E-1 Football Championship qualification
6.	13 November 2018	Taipei Municipal Stadium, Taipei, Taiwan	Mongolia	2–0	2–1	2019 EAFF E-1 Football Championship qualification
