= Ange Kouamé =

Taiwanese footballer (born 1996)

Ange Kouamé 安以恩
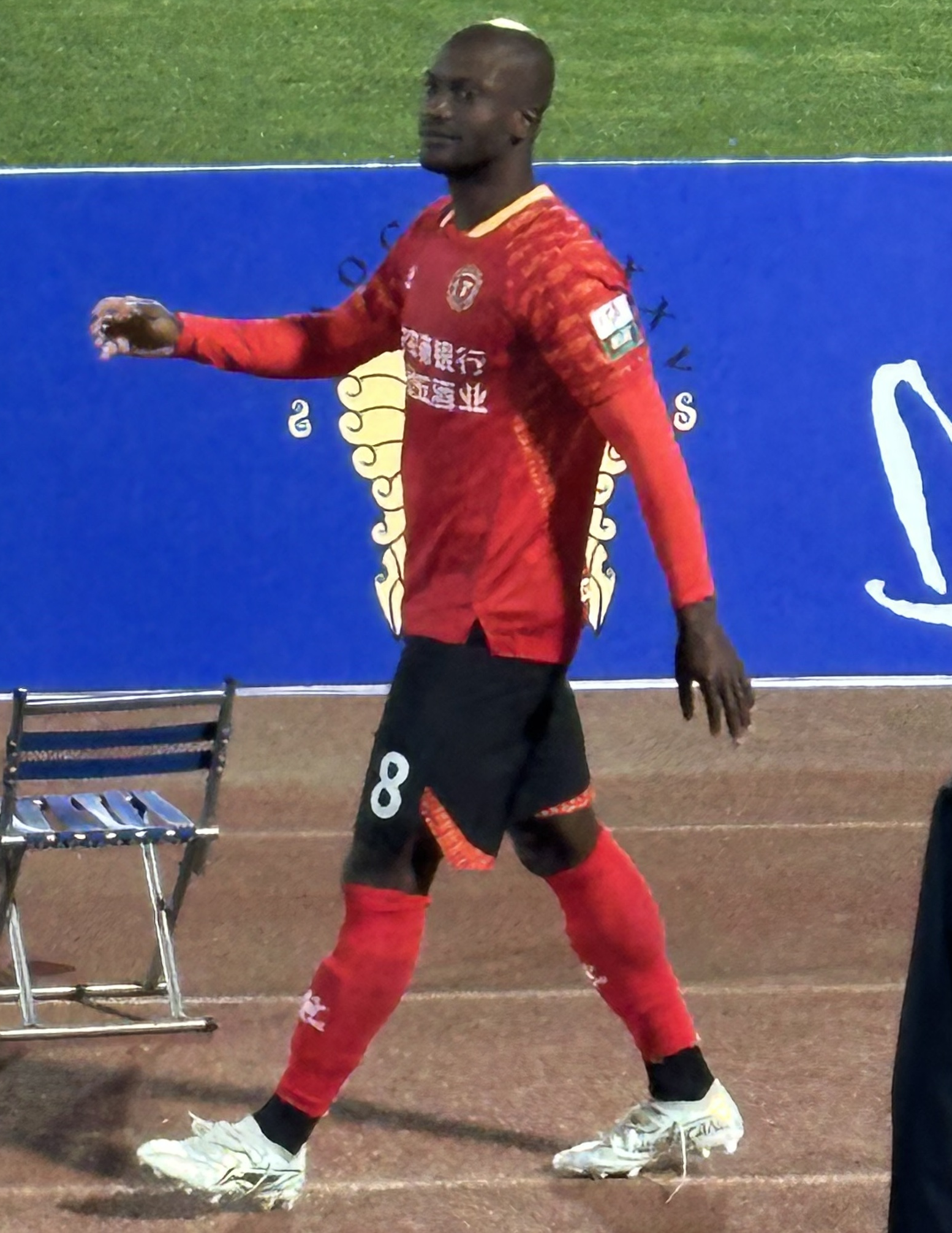
- Kouamé in April 2025

Personal information
- Full name: An Yi-en
- Birth name: Ange Samuel Kouamé
- Date of birth: 22 December 1996 (age 29)
- Place of birth: Abidjan, Ivory Coast
- Height: 1.80 m (5 ft 11 in)
- Position: Forward

Team information
- Current team: Liaoning Tieren
- Number: 7

Senior career*
Years	Team	Apps	(Gls)
2018	Green Archers United	0	(0)
2018–2020	Tatung	59	(44)
2021–2023	Tainan City	51	(32)
2024–	Liaoning Tieren	75	(27)

International career^{‡}
2023–	Chinese Taipei	17	(7)
- * Club domestic league appearances and goals as of 9 November 2026 ‡ National team caps and goals as of 13 November 2026

Ange Samuel Kouamé (born 22 December 1996), also known as An Yi-en (Chinese: 安以恩), is a professional footballer who plays as a forward for Chinese Super League club Liaoning Tieren. Born in the Ivory Coast, he represents the Chinese Taipei national team.

== Early life ==
Kouamé started playing football at a young age and moved to the Philippines in 2016 before moving to Taiwan.

== Club career ==
=== Tatung ===
Kouamé started his football career with Tatung in 2018. He won the 2018 and the 2019 league titles. Kouamé was also the top scorer in the 2020 league with twenty goals.

=== Tainan City ===
In 2021, Kouamé moved to league champions, Tainan City. In his first season, he helped the club to retained the league title winning the 2021 league title. In the following season, Kouamé won the Chinese Taipei Footballer of the Year as he won another league title in the 2022 season.

== International career ==
Kouamé became the second naturalized player to represent Chinese Taipei internationally. On 8 September 2023, he made his international debut against Philippines and in the next match on 12 September 2023, Kouamé scored his debut goal for Chinese Taipei against Singapore.

During the first round of the 2026 FIFA World Cup qualification in both the first and second leg, he provided 3 assists and scoring once against Timor-Leste which saw Chinese Taipei advance to the second round.

List of international goals scored by Ange Kouamé
No.	Date	Venue	Opponent	Score	Result	Competition
1	12 September 2023	Bishan Stadium, Bishan, Singapore	Singapore	1–0	1–3	Friendly
2	17 October 2023	National Stadium, Kaohsiung, Taiwan	Timor-Leste	3–0	3–0	2026 FIFA World Cup qualification
3	18 November 2024	Singapore National Stadium, Kallang, Singapore	Singapore	3–1	3–2	Friendly
4	11 December 2024	Mong Kok Stadium, Mong Kok, Hong Kong	Mongolia	1–0	4–0	2025 EAFF E-1 Football Championship
5	11 December 2024	Mong Kok Stadium, Mong Kok, Hong Kong	Mongolia	4–0	4–0	2025 EAFF E-1 Football Championship
6	25 March 2025	National Stadium, Kaohsiung, Taiwan	Turkmenistan	1–1	1–2	2027 AFC Asian Cup qualification
7	18 November 2025	Arkadag Stadium, Arkadag, Turkmenistan	Turkmenistan	1–1	1–3	2027 AFC Asian Cup qualification

== Style of play ==
Kouamé mainly operates as a striker and is known for his dribbling ability and ability to play in the penalty box.

== Personal life ==
Kouamé has been married to a Taiwanese woman and has a son.

== Honours ==
Tatung

- Taiwan Football Premier League: 2018, 2019

Tainan City

- Taiwan Football Premier League: 2021, 2022, 2023

Liaoning Tieren

- China League One: 2025

Individual

- Taiwan Football Premier League Footballer of the Year: 2022
- Taiwan Football Premier League Top Goalscorer: 2020

== Career statistics ==
=== Club ===
Club	Season	Division	League		Continental		Total	
Club	Season	Division	Apps	Goals	Apps	Goals	Apps	Goals
Tatung	2018	Taiwan Football League	20	9			20	9
Tatung	2019	Taiwan Football League	20	15			20	15
Tatung	2020	Taiwan Football League	19	20			19	20
Tatung	Total		59	44			59	44
Tainan City	2021	Taiwan Football League	14	10			14	10
Tainan City	2022	Taiwan Football League	17	11	2	1	19	12
Tainan City	2023	Taiwan Football League	20	11	6	5	26	16
Tainan City	Total		51	32	8	6	59	38
Liaoning Tieren	2024	Chinese League One	15	10			15	10
Liaoning Tieren	2025	Chinese League One	30	12			30	12
Liaoning Tieren	2026	Chinese Super League	30	5			30	5
Liaoning Tieren	Total		75	27			75	27
Total career			185	103	8	6	193	109
