= Lo Chih-tsung =

Taiwanese football manager

Lo Chih-tsung 羅智聰
Personal information
- Date of birth: 14 August 1956 (age 70)
- Place of birth: Taipei, Chinese Taipei

Team information
- Current team: Taiwan Steel (manager)

Managerial career
- Years: Team
- 1985–1988: Chinese Taipei
- 2009–2011: Chinese Taipei
- 2020–: Taiwan Steel

Lo Chih-tsung (Chinese: 羅智聰; pinyin: Luó Zhìcōng; born 14 August 1956) is a Taiwanese football manager, best known for managing the national team. In his first spell, he was manager from 1985 to 1988, and in his second spell, he was manager from 2009 to 2011.

He also teaches at the National Kaohsiung University of Applied Sciences.
