= 2020 Taiwan Football Challenge League =

Taiwan Football Challenge League 2020

The 2020 Taiwan Football Challenge League is the first year of men's second division football in Taiwan.

The top team from the Second Division league is automatically promoted to the Taiwan Premier League and the lowest placed team in the Taiwan Premier League is relegated to the Second Division League. The runner-up of the Second Division League will play in a qualification play-off final with the 7th placed team in the Taiwan Premier League, which results in the winner playing in the first Division. Similarly, the 7th and 8th placed teams in Second Division will play a qualification tournament with the 1st and 2nd teams from the Challengers tournament which the top two teams stay in Second Division.

== Clubs ==
Taiwan Second Division Football League teams location

Currently there are 8 teams competing in this league. The league has implemented a promotion and relegation system.

Team	Chinese name	Home	First Participation	Awards
AC Taipei	台北競技	Taipei	2020	
CPC Corporation	台灣中油足球隊	Kaohsiung	2020	
Inter Taoyuan	桃園國際	Taoyuan	2020	
Kaohsiung	高雄足球俱樂部	Kaohsiung	2020	
Pakarongay	巴卡隆	New Taipei	2020	
PlayOne Normal University	PlayOne師大	Taipei	2020	
Saturday Football International	SFI	Taipei	2020	
Tong Jie	TJFC	New Taipei	2020	

== League table ==
Pos	Team	Pld	W	D	L	GF	GA	GD	Pts	Qualification or relegation
1	CPC Corporation FC	14	13	1	0	73	4	+69	40	Promotion to TFPL
2	Inter Taoyuan FC	14	10	1	3	49	16	+33	31	Qualification for promotion/relegation play-off
3	AC Taipei	14	9	1	4	62	15	+47	28	
4	Saturday Football International	14	7	2	5	35	28	+7	23	
5	Tong Jie FC	14	6	2	6	44	35	+9	20	
6	PlayOne Normal University	14	4	0	10	17	48	−31	12	
7	FC Kaohsiung	14	2	3	9	20	55	−35	9	
8	Pakarongay	14	0	0	14	7	106	−99	0	

Updated to match(es) played on 31 October 2020. Source: CTFA
Rules for classification: 1) Points; 2) Head-to-Head points; 3) Head-to-Head goal difference; 4) Head-to-Head goals scored; 5) Goal difference; 6) Goals scored
