= Joo Ik-seong =

South Korean footballer (born 1992)

Personal information
- Date of birth: 10 September 1992 (age 34)
- Place of birth: Seoul, South Korea
- Height: 1.77 m (5 ft 10 in)
- Position: Midfielder

Team information
- Current team: Hang Yuen
- Number: 7

Youth career
- 2008–2010: Taesung High School

Senior career*
| Years | Team | Apps | (Gls) |
| 2012–2013 | Seoul | 0 | (0) |
| 2014 | Daejeon Citizen | 2 | (0) |
| 2015 | Yongin City | 16 | (1) |
| 2016 | Hwaseong | | |
| 2017–2019 | Yangpyeong | | |
| 2019–2020 | Hang Yuen | | |
| 2020–2021 | Taichung Futuro | 33 | (21) |
| 2022– | Hang Yuen | | |

International career
| 2008–2009 | South Korea U17 | 10 | (0) |
- * Club domestic league appearances and goals as of 13:05, 13 May 2020 (UTC)

- Joo Ik-seong
- Hangul: 주익성
- Hanja: 朱益成
- RR: Ju Ikseong
- MR: Chu Iksŏng

Joo Ik-seong (Korean: 주익성; born 10 September 1992) is a South Korean professional footballer who plays as a midfielder for Hang Yuen and the South Korea national team.

== Career statistics ==
=== Club ===
As of 13 May 2020.

| Club | Season | League | | | Cup | | Continental | | Other | | Total | |
| Club | Season | Division | Apps | Goals | Apps | Goals | Apps | Goals | Apps | Goals | Apps | Goals |
|---|---|---|---|---|---|---|---|---|---|---|---|---|
| Seoul | 2012 | K-League | 0 | 0 | 0 | 0 | 0 | 0 | 0 | 0 | 0 | 0 |
| Seoul | 2013 | K League Classic | 0 | 0 | 0 | 0 | 0 | 0 | 0 | 0 | 0 | 0 |
| Seoul | Total | | 0 | 0 | 0 | 0 | 0 | 0 | 0 | 0 | 0 | 0 |
| Daejeon Citizen | 2014 | K League Challenge | 2 | 0 | 1 (Note: Appearances in the Korean FA Cup) | 0 | – | | 0 | 0 | 3 | 0 |
| Yongin City | 2015 | Korea National League | 16 | 1 | 0 | 0 | – | | 0 | 0 | 16 | 1 |
| Hwaseong | 2016 | K3 League | ? | ? | 1 | 0 | – | | 0 | 0 | 1 | 0 |
| Hang Yuen | 2019 | TFPL | 21 | 13 | 0 | 0 | 5 (Note: Appearances in the AFC Cup) | 2 | 0 | 0 | 26 | 15 |
| Taichung Futuro | 2020 | TFPL | 5 | 1 | 0 | 0 | – | | 0 | 0 | 5 | 1 |
| Hang Yuen | 2022 | TFPL | | | | | – | | | | | |
| Career total | | | 44 | 15 | 2 | 0 | 5 | 2 | 0 | 0 | 30 | 4 |
