= William López (footballer, born 1993) =

Taiwanese footballer (born 1993)

Personal information
- Full name: William Isaac López Esquivel
- Date of birth: 11 November 1993 (age 33)
- Place of birth: San Salvador, El Salvador
- Height: 1.76 m (5 ft 9 in)
- Position: Centre-back

Team information
- Current team: Hang Yuan
- Number: 3

Senior career*
Years	Team	Apps	(Gls)
2014–2018	Royal Blues		
2019–	Hang Yuan	85	(0)

International career^{‡}
2024–	Chinese Taipei	6	(0)
- * Club domestic league appearances and goals as of 24 August 2025 ‡ National team caps and goals as of 13 November 2026

William Isaac López Esquivel (born 11 November 1993) is a professional footballer who plays as a centre-back for Hang Yuan. Born in El Salvador, he plays for the Chinese Taipei national team.

== Early and personal life ==
López was born on 11 November 1993 in San Salvador, El Salvador. He started playing football at the age of five. He studied in Taiwan. López is married to a Taiwanese woman and has a daughter.

== Career ==
In 2014, López signed for Taiwanese side Royal Blues.

In 2019, López signed for Taiwanese side Hang Yuan. López was described as "an important part of the team... proven to be a reliable player, managing to establish himself as a starter" while playing for the club.

International career

Having lived in Taiwan since 2012, López was granted Taiwanese citizenship and passport, making him eligible to represent Chinese Taipei at the international level. In September 2024, he was called up to the Chinese Taipei national team for a training camp. On 11 October 2024, he made his debut for the Chinese Taipei national football team in a 3-2 friendly loss to Cambodia.

== Style of play ==
López mainly operates as a right-footed right-back. López has also played as a central defender, left-back, and defensive midfielder.
