= Marc Fenelus =

Turks & Caicos footballer and manager

Personal information
- Full name: Marc-Donald Fenelus
- Date of birth: 22 August 1992 (age 34)
- Place of birth: Providenciales, Turks & Caicos Islands
- Height: 1.82 m (6 ft 0 in)
- Position: Forward

College career
Years	Team	Apps	(Gls)
2011–2012	Western Texas Westerners	42	(40)
2013–2014	Cal State Fullerton Titans	41	(9)

Senior career*
Years	Team	Apps	(Gls)
2015–2019	Tatung	79	(115)
2020–2023	Taiwan Steel	61	(56)

International career^{‡}
2014–	Turks & Caicos Islands	15	(2)

Managerial career
- 2016–2017: Full Physic
- * Club domestic league appearances and goals as of 4 June 2023 ‡ National team caps and goals as of 18 November 2019

Marc-Donald Fenelus (or Marco; born 22 August 1992) is a Turks & Caicos Islands international footballer who last played for Taiwan Football Premier League club Taiwan Steel.

== Career ==
=== College ===
Fenelus played college soccer at Western Texas College in 2011 and 2012, before transferring to Cal State Fullerton for 2013 and 2014.

=== Professional ===
On 15 January 2015 Fenelus was selected in the third round (47th overall) in the 2015 MLS SuperDraft by New England Revolution.

Fenelus joined Taiwanese Intercity Football League side Tatung in September 2015.

In April 2020, it was revealed that Fenelus had joined Taiwan Steel.

=== International career ===
Fenelus made his debut for Turks and Caicos in a July 2011 World Cup qualification match against the Bahamas. He has represented his country in World Cup qualification games and at the 2014 Caribbean Cup.

== Career statistics ==
=== Club ===
Club	Season	League			Cup		Continental		Other		Total	
Club	Season	Division	Apps	Goals	Apps	Goals	Apps	Goals	Apps	Goals	Apps	Goals
AFC National	2009–10	Provo Premier League					—		—			
AFC National	2010–11	Provo Premier League	12	20			—		—			
AFC National	Total								0	0		
Tatung	2015–16	Intercity Football League			—		—		—			
Tatung	2017	TFPL		35	—				—			
Tatung	2018	TFPL		37	—		—		—			
Tatung	2019	TFPL		17	—		—		—			
Tatung	Total				0	0			0	0		
Tainan City	2020	TFPL	19	19	—		—		—		19	19
Tainan City	2021	TFPL	13	11	—		3	0	—		16	11
Tainan City	2022	TFPL	17	19	—		2	1	—		19	20
Tainan City	2023	TFPL	13	8	—		—		—		13	8
Tainan City	Total				0	0			0	0		
Career total					0	0			0	0		

=== International ===
Scores and results list Turks and Caicos Islands' goal tally first.

No	Date	Venue	Opponent	Score	Result	Competition
1.	3 June 2014	Trinidad Stadium, Oranjestad, Aruba	British Virgin Islands	1–0	2–0	2014 Caribbean Cup qualification
2.	16 March 2019	Thomas Robinson Stadium, Nassau, Bahamas	Bahamas	1–5	1–6	Friendly

== Coaching career ==
Beginning in 2016, Fenelus managed Provo Premier League club Full Physic, alongside fellow Turks and Caicos international James Rene.
