= Chiu I-huan =

Taiwanese footballer

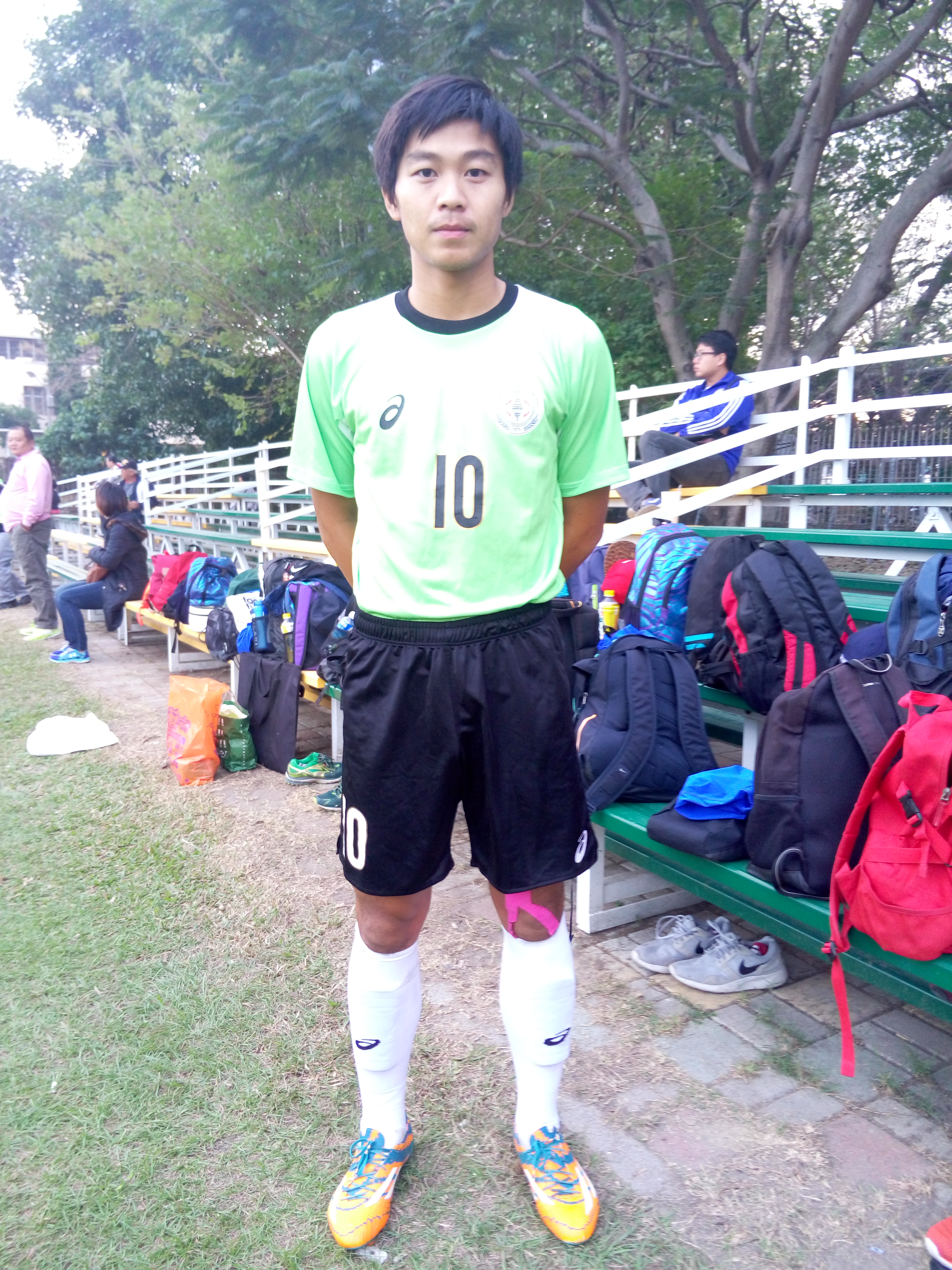
- Chiu I-huan in 2015

Personal information
- Full name: Chiu I-huan
- Date of birth: 15 March 1990 (age 36)
- Place of birth: Taipei, Taiwan
- Height: 1.75 m (5 ft 9 in)
- Position: Striker

Team information
- Current team: Ming Chuan University

Senior career*
Years	Team	Apps	(Gls)
2011–	Ming Chuan University		

International career^{‡}
2011–	Chinese Taipei	8	(1)
- * Club domestic league appearances and goals as of 4 December 2012 ‡ National team caps and goals as of 19 November 2014

Chiu I-huan (Chinese: 邱奕寰; born 15 March 1990) is a Taiwanese footballer who plays as a striker for Ming Chuan University.
