= Pan Wen-chieh =

Taiwanese footballer (born 1992)

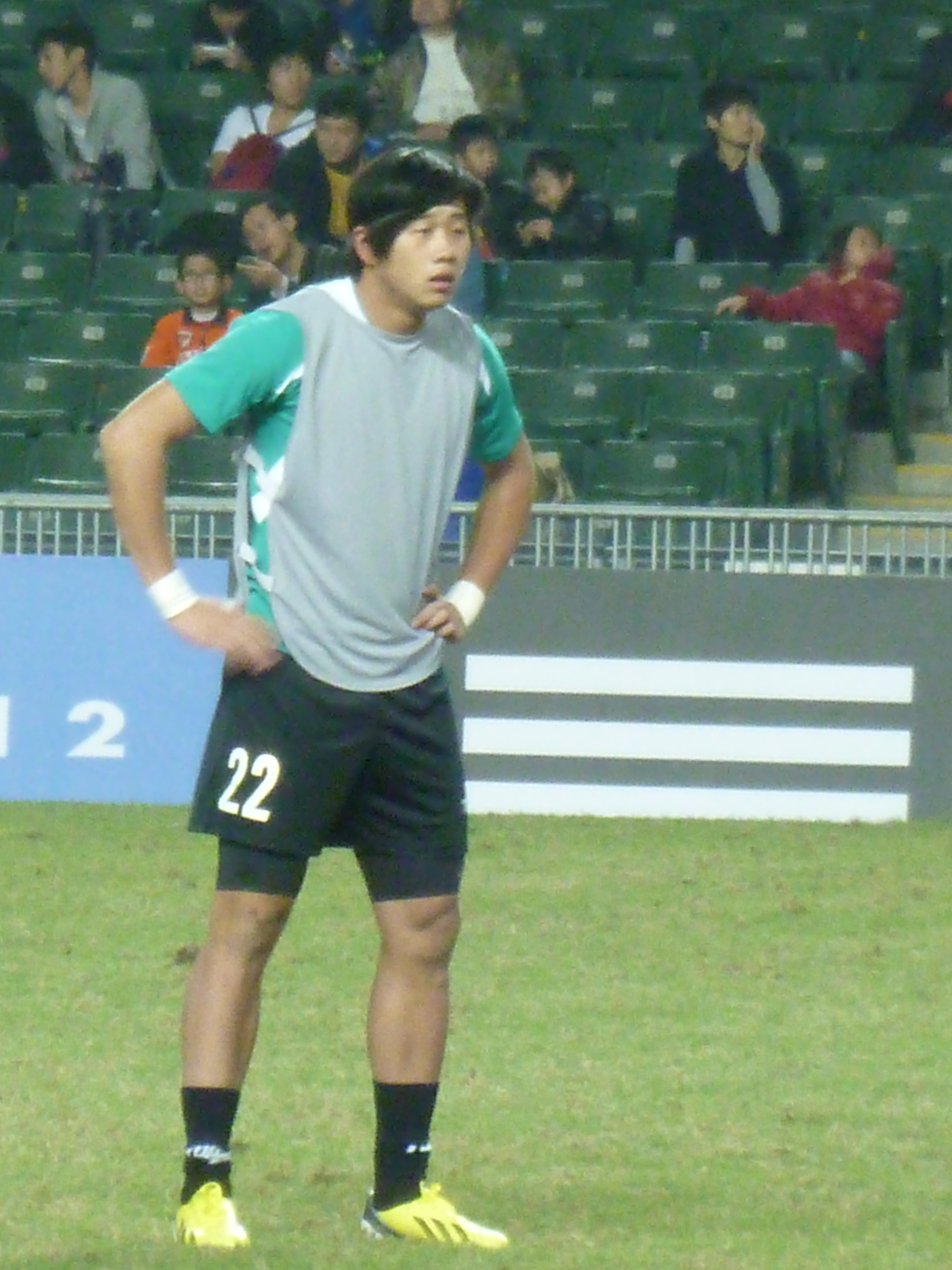
- Pan Wen-chieh in 2012

Personal information
- Full name: Pan Wen-chieh
- Date of birth: June 29, 1992 (age 34)
- Place of birth: Taipei, Taiwan
- Height: 1.87 m (6 ft 2 in)
- Position: Goalkeeper

Team information
- Current team: Taiwan Steel
- Number: 1

Senior career*
Years	Team	Apps	(Gls)
2011–2019	Tatung	21	(0)
2020–2021	Taiwan Steel	22	(0)
2022	Taichung FUTURO	18	(0)
2023–	Taiwan Steel	16	(0)

International career^{‡}
2012–	Chinese Taipei	44	(0)
2018	Chinese Taipei Asian Games	3	(0)
- * Club domestic league appearances and goals as of 28 March 2024 ‡ National team caps and goals as of 11 June 2024

Pan Wen-chieh (Chinese: 潘文傑; born 29 June 1992) is a Taiwanese footballer who currently plays as a goalkeeper for Taiwan Football Premier League club Taiwan Steel.

== Club career ==
On 17 October 2019, it was announced that Pan had reached an agreement to join Hong Kong Premier League club Tai Po in January 2020. However, on 14 January 2020, Tai Po terminated their contract with Pan before he had ever suited up for the club.
