= Kentaro Sato (footballer) =

Japanese footballer

Kentaro Sato 佐藤 健太郎
Personal information
- Full name: Kentaro Sato
- Date of birth: August 14, 1984 (age 42)
- Place of birth: Mie, Japan
- Height: 1.77 m (5 ft 10 in)
- Position: Defensive midfielder

Team information
- Current team: Hang Yuan FC
- Number: 8

Youth career
- 2000–2002: Nabari Nishi High School

College career
Years	Team	Apps	(Gls)
2003–2006	Juntendo University		

Senior career*
Years	Team	Apps	(Gls)
2007–2011	Montedio Yamagata	134	(3)
2012–2015	JEF United Chiba	140	(0)
2016	Kyoto Sanga	34	(0)
2017–2022	Renofa Yamaguchi	94	(0)
- * Club domestic league appearances and goals

Kentaro Sato (佐藤 健太郎, Satō Kentarō; born August 14, 1984 in Mie Prefecture, Japan) is a Japanese professional football player who plays for Hang Yuan FC in the Taiwan Football Premier League. He joined the club in February 2024, operates primarily as a defensive midfielder, and is listed at 1.77 m tall.

== Career statistics ==
Updated to end of 2018 season.

Appearances and goals by club, season and competition
Club	Season	League			Emperor's Cup		J.League Cup		Total	
Club	Season	Division	Apps	Goals	Apps	Goals	Apps	Goals	Apps	Goals
Montedio Yamagata	2007	J2 League	10	0	0	0	—		10	0
Montedio Yamagata	2008	J2 League	32	2	2	0	—		34	2
Montedio Yamagata	2009	J1 League	32	0	2	0	4	0	38	0
Montedio Yamagata	2010	J1 League	33	0	3	0	6	0	42	0
Montedio Yamagata	2011	J1 League	27	1	1	0	2	0	30	1
JEF United Chiba	2012	J2 League	34	0	2	0	—		36	0
JEF United Chiba	2013	J2 League	40	0	2	0	—		42	0
JEF United Chiba	2014	J2 League	37	0	4	0	—		41	0
JEF United Chiba	2015	J2 League	29	0	2	0	—		31	0
Kyoto Sanga	2016	J2 League	34	0	1	0	—		35	0
Renofa Yamaguchi	2017	J2 League	36	0	1	0	—		37	0
Renofa Yamaguchi	2018	J2 League	21	0	0	0	—		21	0
Career total			365	3	20	0	12	0	397	3
