= Wu Chun-ching =

Taiwanese footballer (born 1988)

Personal information
- Full name: Wu Chun-ching
- Date of birth: 18 December 1988 (age 37)
- Place of birth: Tainan, Taiwan
- Height: 1.80 m (5 ft 11 in)
- Position: Midfielder

Team information
- Current team: Taiwan Steel
- Number: 11

Senior career*
Years	Team	Apps	(Gls)
2009	Kaohsiung Yoedy		
2011–2012	Taiwan PE College		
2013–2014	Taipower		
2015	Hunan Billows		
2016	Tatung FC		
2017	Banbueng		
2017–2021	Tainan City		
2022	Taichung Futuro	17	(0)
2023–	Taiwan Steel	3	(1)

International career^{‡}
2010–	Chinese Taipei	74	(12)
- * Club domestic league appearances and goals as of 24 August 2013 ‡ National team caps and goals as of 13 November 2026

Wu Chun-ching (Chinese: 吳俊青) is a Taiwanese footballer who plays as a midfielder for Taiwan Steel and the Chinese Taipei national team.

== Club career ==
On 19 December 2014, Wu transferred to China League One side Hunan Billows.

== International career ==
=== International goals ===
Scores and results list Taiwan's goal tally first.

List of international goals scored by Wu Chun-ching
No.	Date	Venue	Opponent	Score	Result	Competition
1.	30 September 2011	National Stadium, Kaohsiung, Taiwan	Macau	3–0	3–0	Friendly
2.	8 September 2015	Taipei Municipal Stadium, Taipei, Taiwan	Vietnam	1–1	1–2	2018 FIFA World Cup qualification
3.	19 March 2016	Taipei Municipal Stadium, Taipei, Taiwan	Guam	2–2	3–2	Friendly
4.	24 March 2016	Mỹ Đình National Stadium, Hanoi, Vietnam	Vietnam	1–0	1–4	2018 FIFA World Cup qualification
5.	30 June 2016	Guam Football Association National Training Center, Dededo, Guam	Northern Mariana Islands	1–0	8–1	2017 EAFF E-1 Football Championship
6.	30 June 2016	Guam Football Association National Training Center, Dededo, Guam	Northern Mariana Islands	5–0	8–1	2017 EAFF E-1 Football Championship
7.	8 October 2016	National Stadium, Kaohsiung, Taiwan	Timor-Leste	1–1	2–1	2019 AFC Asian Cup qualification
8.	8 October 2016	National Stadium, Kaohsiung, Taiwan	Timor-Leste	2–1	2–1	2019 AFC Asian Cup qualification
9.	12 November 2016	Mong Kok Stadium, Mong Kok, Hong Kong	Guam	1–0	2–0	2017 EAFF E-1 Football Championship
10.	7 September 2018	Taipei Municipal Stadium, Taipei, Taiwan	Malaysia	1–0	2–0	Friendly
11.	7 June 2019	National Stadium, Kaohsiung, Taiwan	Nepal	1–0	1–1	Friendly
12.	15 June 2021	Jaber Al-Ahmad International Stadium, Kuwait City, Kuwait	Kuwait	1–1	1–2	2022 FIFA World Cup qualification
