= Saturday Football International =

Taiwanese football club

- Full name: Saturday Football International Football Club
- Short name: S.F.I.
- Founded: 2017; 8 years ago
- League: Taiwan Second Division Football League
- 2021: 2021 Taiwan Challenge League, 3rd
- Website: http://www.saturdayfootball.org/

Saturday Football International (Chinese: 週六足球國際; pinyin: zhōuliù zúqiú guójì), or simply S.F.I., is a professional football club based in Taipei, Taiwan. They competed in the inaugural edition of the Taiwan Second Division Football League, and remains in the league, without ever being promoted to the first division.
