= Taipei Red Lions F.C. =

Taiwanese football club

Red Lions F.C.
- Full name: Taipei Red Lions Football Club
- Nickname: The Lions
- Founded: 1983; 43 years ago
- Ground: Taipei Municipal Stadium; New Taipei
- Capacity: 20,000
- Owner: Taipei Red Lions Association
- Chairman: Douglas Alfaro
- League: Taiwan Second Division Football League
Home colours	Away colours

Taipei Red Lions Football Club were a professional football club from Taipei, last participating in Taiwan Football Premier League. Red Lions has won two Taiwan Football Premier League promotion tournaments, six Taipei International Football Leagues, one Businessmen Football League, one Taipei Super Cup and several local and international short tournaments.

Taipei Red Lions football team was founded in 1983 as the amateur team from Tianmu, Shilin District.

In 1989, Red Lions were one of the founding members of the Businessmen Football League, the top amateur league in Taiwan for many years.

In 2005 Red Lions were one of the founding members of Taipei International Football League, a highly inclusive tournament suitable for players of all ages and nationalities that has become the strongest annual amateur league in Taiwan.

In 2017 Red Lions signed an cooperation agreement with Taicheng Football Academy

The outstanding performance of Taipei Red Lions in the amateur league and the cooperation agreement signed with Taicheng Football Academy motivated the team to participate in Taiwan First Division Qualifiers in 2017, winning the tournament and the right to join CTFA top-level league in 2018.

In 2018 Red Lions signed a cooperation agreement with University of Taipei to foster the best young talents in Taiwan as international-level professional football players and create real benefits for future generations.

== History ==
Under their new name of Taicheng Lions, the club qualified for the 2018 TFPL Qualification Tournament. A 3–2 victory over Ming Chuan University was followed by a 1–1 draw and penalty shootout defeat to Tainan City, meaning that they had to defeat fellow newcomers Bear Bro Ilan to assure themselves of qualification. A resounding 17–0 victory gained them the first position in the qualifiers and ensured that Taicheng Lions would compete in the Taiwan Football Premier League in 2018.

The success of the project quickly catches the attention of the football community and many of the staff and players from Taicheng Lions were recruited for teams in China, Spain or around Taiwan. The team had to rebuild the project in 2019 with new youth talent. In 2019 Red Lions and Taicheng merged and the club decided to use the same Red Lions name for all its teams. Once again at the end of 2019 season many players were transferred to teams in Chile, Cambodia and Taiwan, making them one of the most prominent players' developer in the island.

The new club was formed in 2021 after the Zhanyi Group took over the license of Red Lions. The new owners opted to relaunch the club as a new entity, branding the new side Flight Skywalkers.

== Symbols ==
=== Red colour ===
It represented the passion of the team for football and its fans, just like the Taipei City flag symbolized caring for society.

=== Crest ===
Red Lions crest was a red circular affair with the eponymous red lion taking central part. Inside the circle was the name of the team in Chinese (台北紅獅足球俱樂部), and the year the team was founded (1983). The lion symbolized courage, majesty, and the strength of the club.

=== Mascot ===
The name of the mascot was Dahong (大鴻), big red in Chinese, a red dancing lion that represents good luck and fortune, also the team work necessary in football.

== Final squad ==
Note: Flags indicate national team as defined under FIFA eligibility rules; some limited exceptions apply. Players may hold more than one non-FIFA nationality.

No.	Pos.	Nation	Player
2	DF	TPE	Yiyou Wang
3	DF	TPE	Kai WenTian
7	FW	TPE	Jack Lin
11	FW	TPE	Youlin Chen
12	MF	TPE	Chenglin Song
13	MF	TPE	Wenyan Qin
19	FW	TPE	Kuanheng Lin
20	DF	TPE	Pingqi Hsie

No.	Pos.	Nation	Player
23	MF	TPE	Yusheng Pan
24	MF	TPE	Fuseng Hsu
25	GK	TPE	Shicheng Hong
28	MF	TPE	Xiangyi Wang
51	GK	TPE	Kuanpei Lee
66	DF	TPE	Mike Zheng
69	MF	TPE	Zhengru Tsai
99	FW	TPE	Junlong Yang

== Final staff ==
Coaching
Head coach	(Germany) Robert Iwanicki
Assistant coach
Assistant coach	(Venezuela) Adrian Espinal
Sports director	(Chile) Francisco Arce
Fitness
Fitness coach	(Taiwan) Nicole Tang
Medical
Head of medical	(Taiwan) Junta Chen
Administrative
Secretary	(Taiwan) Carolina Chen
Media manager	(Taiwan) Yin Liang

== Honours ==
Taipei Red Lions F.C. honours
Type	Competition	Titles	Seasons
Domestic
Domestic	Taiwan Football Premier League	0	
Domestic	Taiwan Football Premier League Promotion Tournament	2	2017, 2020
Domestic	Taipei International Football League *previously On Tap Premier League and before Carnegie's Premier League	6	2005, 2013, 2015, 2016, 2018, 2019
Domestic	Taipei International Super Cup	1	2019
Domestic	Businessmen Football League BML	1	1996
Domestic	Taiwan Island wide Tournaments in Taipei, Hsinchu, Taichung & Kaohsiung	11	1983, 1987, 1992, 1996, 1997, 1998, 2001, 2003, 2005, 2013, 2015
Continental	AFC Cup	0	
Continental	Phonom Pen Int. Tournament	1	1997
Continental	Manila Int. Tournament	1	1998
Continental	Bangkok Int. Tournament	1	2014
Worldwide	FIFA Club World Cup	0	
