= Chiang Mu-tsai =

Taiwanese footballer and manager

Chiang Mu-tsai 強木在
Personal information
- Date of birth: 12 March 1953 (age 73)
- Place of birth: Taiwan

Managerial career
- Years: Team
- 1994–2000: Chinese Taipei
- 2012: Chinese Taipei
- 2017-: Tatung Football Club

Chiang Mu-tsai (Chinese: 強木在; pinyin: Qiáng Mùzài) is a Taiwanese football manager and former player. When he was a player, he played for Tatung F.C.

== Coaching and managerial career ==
In 1988, he was appointed Tatung's head coach.

During Chiang’s tenure, Tatung F.C. won multiple national league titles and participated in regional competitions such as the AFC President’s Cup, where they represented Taiwan against other emerging football nations.

From 1994 to 2000, he also served as Chinese Taipei national football team's head coach.

As of 2024, he continues to influence Taiwanese football as the manager of Taiwan Leopard Cat FC, aiming to challenge top competitors in the Taiwan Football Premier League.

== Honours ==
- Enterprise Football League: 2005, 2006
- Intercity Football League: 2007
  - Best Coach (2007)
