= Taipei Elite SC =

Taiwanese football club

- Full name: Taipei Elite SC
- Founded: 2021; 5 years ago
- League: Taiwan Second Division Football League
- 2023: 8th (relegated)
Home colours	Away colours

Taipei Elite SC (Chinese: 臺北菁英) is a football club based in Taipei, Taiwan which currently competes in the Taiwan Second Division Football League.

== History ==
The club was formed in 2021 after the Zhanyi Group took over the license of Red Lions, who had previously competed in the league from 2018 to 2020. The new owners opted to relaunch the club as a new entity, branding the new side Flight Skywalkers with a new crest and kit. The team in its maiden season was mainly supplied by Taipei City University of Science and Technology. The team was renamed Taipei Deva Dragons in the 2023 season. On May 9, 2023, the team was renamed Taipei Dragons after the team received naming sponsorship by the Taipei City Government. The team was renamed Taipei Elite SC in the 2024 season.

== Squad (2023) ==
Note: Flags indicate national team as defined under FIFA eligibility rules; some limited exceptions apply. Players may hold more than one non-FIFA nationality.

No.	Pos.	Nation	Player
1	GK	TPE	Li Guan-pei
2	DF	TPE	Feng Tsung-liang
4	DF	TPE	Cheng Chih-huan
5	MF	TPE	Peng Chia-en
6	MF	TPE	Chao Wei-chieh
7	FW	JPN	Naoya Tokai
8	MF	TPE	Huang Kuo-fu
9	FW	TPE	Liu Chien-wei
10	MF	TPE	Tsai Cheng-ju
11	DF	TPE	Chin Wen-yen
12	FW	TPE	Lin Chun-kai
13	DF	TPE	Shih Cheng-hsi
14	MF	TPE	Wei Yu-chun
15	MF	TPE	Chen Yao-ming

No.	Pos.	Nation	Player
16	MF	TPE	Wei Chih-chuan
18	MF	TPE	Chen Yu-chang
19	MF	TPE	Chang Chia-jui
20	FW	BRA	Luan Andderson
21	FW	JPN	Takuya Ogata
22	GK	TPE	Hung Shih-cheng
23	FW	TPE	Wang Po-han
24	MF	TPE	Nien Chia-en
25	MF	TPE	Yang Cheng-chun
26	FW	TPE	Chiang Chun-yi
27	MF	TPE	Yen I-hong
29	FW	TPE	Su Ming-chiang
30	FW	TPE	Wang Hsiang-yi
35	DF	TPE	Su De-cai
