= Royal Blues F.C. =

Taiwanese football club

Royal Blues Taipei 皇家蔚藍足球俱樂部
- Full name: Royal Blues Taipei Football Club
- Founded: 2009; 16 years ago
- Ground: Taipei Municipal Stadium
- Capacity: 20,000
- League: Taiwan Football Premier League
Home colours	Away colours

Royal Blues Taipei Football Club (Chinese: 皇家蔚藍足球俱樂部; pinyin: Huángjiā Wèilán Zúqiú Jùlèbù) were a Taiwanese professional football club based in Taipei.

In 2014/15 they won the BML League Title (2nd Division), only losing once in the process. On 16 August 2015, the Royal Blues won promotion to Division 1 and finished 5th. They competed in the 2017 and 2018 editions of the Taiwan Football Premier League.
