= Hang Yuan FC =

Taiwanese football club

New Taipei Hang Yuan
- Full name: New Taipei Hang Yuan Football Club
- Short name: NTHY
- Founded: 2012; 14 years ago
- Ground: Fu Jen University Football Stadium
- Capacity: 3,000
- Owner: Fu Jen Catholic University
- Chairman: Lin Yong-Cheng
- Head coach: Hung Chin-Hwai
- League: Taiwan Football Premier League
- 2025–26: TFPL, 2nd of 8
Home colours	Away colours

Hang Yuan Football Club (Chinese: 航源足球俱樂部; pinyin: Háng Yuán Zúqiú Jùlèbù; also spelled Hang Yuen, sometimes known as New Taipei Hang Yuan FJCU) is a professional football club based in New Taipei, Taiwan, that competes in the Taiwan Football Premier League. The club was previously known as Air Source Development and is currently affiliated with Fu Jen Catholic University. Hang Yuan was the first Taiwanese team to take part in the AFC Cup.

== History ==
=== Intercity Football League era ===
The club formed as Air Source Development FC and first entered the Intercity Football League in 2013. The club struggled in its early years, regularly having to play in qualification rounds in order to preserve its top flight status. In 2013, the club finished 7th of 8 teams, picking up only 7 points. Though it won the next season's qualification tournament, it still finished with the same points tally next season, albeit at an improved 6th place due to Chiayi County F.C. finishing rock bottom with 0 points. They avoided the preliminary round for the 2015–16 season, but it proved to be their least successful season yet, as they followed Chiayi County in finishing bottom of the table with 0 points.

=== Taiwan Football Premier League ===
For the newly revamped 2017 Taiwan Football Premier League, Air Source Development changed their name to Hang Yuan F.C. and enlisted the help of Fu Jen Catholic University to improve the team's standard. This saw an immediate improvement, as Hang Yuan finished 4th in the league phase of the new top-flight structure in Taiwan. This finish allowed them to compete in the 3rd place play-off against Hasus TSU F.C. Over two legs, Hang Yuan ran out 5–2 aggregate winners to finish 3rd in the inaugural TFPL season.

Due to the failures of Taipower and Tatung to obtain AFC Club Licences, Hang Yuan were granted Taiwan's place in the 2018 AFC Cup Group Stage, the first club from the country to do so. Signing Haiti international and former Major League Soccer midfielder Jean-Marc Alexandre, the team entered into a group with Benfica de Macau, and North Korean clubs April 25 Sports Club and Hwaebul. A close fought 3–2 defeat to Benfica de Macau was swiftly followed by a heavy 5–1 loss to April 25.

== Current squad ==
=== Men's squad ===
==== First team ====
Note: Flags indicate national team as defined under FIFA eligibility rules; some limited exceptions apply. Players may hold more than one non-FIFA nationality.

No.	Pos.	Nation	Player
1	GK	TPE	Odo Jacobs
2	DF	TPE	Huang Yung-chun (captain)
3	MF	TPE	William López
5	DF	JPN	Nagisa Sakurauchi
6	DF	TPE	Huang Chun-lin
7	MF	TPE	Chang Ssu-yu
8	MF	JPN	Kentaro Sato
9	FW	TPE	Ng Pui-hei
10	MF	JPN	Shingo Koreeda
11	MF	JPN	Naoki Kaneko
13	DF	TPE	Chen Pao-chun
14	MF	TPE	Tsai En-chi
15	MF	TPE	Wu Po-sheng
16	FW	TPE	Lu Yi-hung

No.	Pos.	Nation	Player
17	DF	TPE	Wang Po-ying
18	GK	TPE	Chang Po-feng
19	FW	TPE	Chen Kuan-lin
20	MF	KOR	Lee Tae-bin
21	FW	TPE	Lin Tsong-hung
23	MF	TPE	Jhou Ci-jyun
24	MF	TPE	Lu Yi-ting
25	FW	TPE	Lin Hai-cheng
26	MF	HON	Elias Argueta
27	DF	TPE	Lee Yen-ju
28	FW	TPE	Lin Pin-tse
29	FW	TPE	Chiuan Je-wei
30	DF	TPE	Chang Wen-hsiang
31	MF	TPE	Wang Hao-lin

==== Reserves team ====
Note: Flags indicate national team as defined under FIFA eligibility rules; some limited exceptions apply. Players may hold more than one non-FIFA nationality.

No.	Pos.	Nation	Player
4	DF	TPE	Chang Wen-hsiang
8	MF	TPE	Chang Yi-teng
15	MF	TPE	Wang Hao-lin
17	MF	TPE	Chen Chun-hsien
21	FW	TPE	Chuan Che-wei
29	DF	TPE	Lee Yen-ju

No.	Pos.	Nation	Player
30	MF	TPE	Lin Ping-tse
34	MF	TPE	Tsai Chi-lun
37	GK	TPE	Chien Wei-ming
42	MF	TPE	Ko Ting-han
43	DF	TPE	Chen Yen-chih

=== Women's squad ===
Note: Flags indicate national team as defined under FIFA eligibility rules; some limited exceptions apply. Players may hold more than one non-FIFA nationality.

No.	Pos.	Nation	Player
1	GK	TPE	Wang Kai-hsuan
2		TPE	Saki Matsunaga
3		JPN	Kotomi Nitta
4		JPN	Moe Ota
5		JPN	Kaede Nakamura
6		JPN	Mai Okubo
7		TPE	He Jia-shiuan
8		TPE	Pu Hsin-hui
9		TPE	Liu Yu-chiao
10		JPN	Kano Miyamoto
11		TPE	Chen Chu-han

No.	Pos.	Nation	Player
13		TPE	Pan Yen-hsin
14		TPE	Yang Po-er
15		TPE	Pan Ya-hsin
16		TPE	Su Hsin-yun (captain)
17		TPE	Chen Jou-yu
18	GK	TPE	Wang Yu-ting
20		TPE	Lin Pin-hsin
21		TPE	Chen Yu-chin
22		TPE	Lin Pin-yun
23	GK	TPE	Chiu Yi-hsiu
25		JPN	Yuka Nishiyama

== Continental record ==
- Hang Yuan's score listed first

Season	Competition	Round	Club	Home	Away	Position
2018	AFC Cup	Group I	Benfica Macau	1–4	2–3	4th
2018	AFC Cup	Group I	(North Korea) April 25	1–5	1–5	4th
2018	AFC Cup	Group I	(North Korea) Hwaebul SC	0–1	1–6	4th
2019	AFC Cup	Group I	(North Korea) April 25	0–3	0–5	4th
2019	AFC Cup	Group I	(Hong Kong) Tai Po	1–1	2–4	4th
2019	AFC Cup	Group I	(Hong Kong) Kitchee	1–2	0–3	4th
2026–27	AFC Challenge League	Preliminary stage	(Mongolia) FC Ulaanbaatar	2–1		
2026–27	AFC Challenge League	Group E	(Philippines) Manila Digger	1–1		4th
2026–27	AFC Challenge League	Group E	(Myanmar) Shan United	1–1		4th
2026–27	AFC Challenge League	Group E	(Brunei) Kasuka	1–2		4th

== See also ==
- Fu Jen Catholic University
