= Tainan City F.C. =

Association football club in Chinese Taipei

Tainan City
- Full name: Tainan City Football Club
- Nickname: The Eagles
- Founded: 2016; 10 years ago
- Ground: Tainan Municipal Football Field; Kaohsiung Nanzih Football Stadium; Taipei Municipal Stadium (selected matches)
- Capacity: 2,000; 1,200; 20,000
- Owner(s): Tainan City Government; Taiwan Steel Group
- Manager: João Prates
- League: Taiwan Football Premier League
- 2025-26: Taiwan Football Premier League, 1st of 8 (champions)
- Website: https://tsgfc.com.tw/
Home colours	Away colours

Tainan City Football Club (for sponsorship reasons currently known as Taiwan Steel and Tainan City TSG; Chinese: 台灣鋼鐵足球隊) is a Taiwanese professional football club based in Tainan City, which currently competes in the Taiwan Football Premier League.

Tainan City has won a record 6 league titles in the club history. In 2024, they become the first club in the league to win a record five consecutive league titles.

== History ==
Tainan City Football Club was established with the support of the Tainan City Government and the Football Committee of the Tainan City Sports Federation, Hongxin Enterprise and Taiwan Steel Group. The team joined the Taiwan Football Premier League, under the name Tainan City in 2017, which most of the players came from Tianmu Campus, University of Taipei. Tainan City structure and its players changed, since Taiwan Steel Group acquired the club and renamed it as Tainan City Taiwan Steel in 2019, importing national team players such as Wu Chun-ching.

=== 2019 to present - as Tainan City Taiwan Steel ===
Ahead of the 2020 season, Tainan City added national team players like Pan Wen-chieh, Chen Wei-chuan, 2019 'Best Player' award winner Marc Fenelus, and 2019 'Golden Boot' award winner Benchy Estama. Tainan City went on to win the 2020 season league title, receiving the club's first major piece of silverware and direct qualification to the 2021 AFC Cup.

Tainan City won the league title in the next three seasons, becoming the first Taiwanese club to win four consecutive times.

=== Performance in Asian competitions ===
At the 2021 AFC Cup, Tainan City won their first ever AFC Cup match against Mongolian club Athletic 220, ultimately finishing third in the group and exiting the tournament.

In the inaugural 2024–25 AFC Challenge League they came second in their group, including a win against Laotian team Young Elephants. At the quarter-finals stage in March 2025, they faced off against Indonesian club Madura United and lost.

== Current squad ==
Note: Flags indicate national team as defined under FIFA eligibility rules; some limited exceptions apply. Players may hold more than one non-FIFA nationality.

No.	Pos.	Nation	Player
1	GK	TPE	Pan Wen-chieh
3	DF	KOR	Kim Sung-kyum
4	DF	TPE	Fong Shao-chi
5	DF	TPE	Wang Ruei
6	MF	KOR	Kim Young-geun
7	FW	KOR	Oh Se-sim
8	MF	TPE	Tsai Cheng-ju
9	FW	BRA	Wilker
10	MF	BRA	Matheus Porto
11	MF	TPE	Wu Chun-ching
12	DF	KOR	Kim Sang-jun
13	DF	TPE	Kuo Po-wei
14	DF	TPE	Liu Ho-han

No.	Pos.	Nation	Player
17	MF	GHA	Isreal Opoku
18	MF	TPE	Lee Chia-le
19	MF	TPE	Lin Ming-wei
20	MF	TPE	Adop Koli
21	FW	TPE	Chen Po-yu
22	GK	TPE	Hung Shih-cheng
23	FW	KOR	Lim Sang-woo
24	DF	TPE	Dai Ya-cheng
25	MF	TPE	Li Bo-you
28	FW	TPE	Yeh Ching-chun
29	DF	COL	Kevin Moreno
31	GK	TPE	Wang Po-hang
33	MF	TPE	Chen Yi-xuan

== Continental record ==
Season	Competition	Round	Opponent	Home	Away	Aggregate
2021	AFC Cup	Group J	(Mongolia) Athletic 220	3–0		3rd
2021	AFC Cup	Group J	(Hong Kong) Lee Man	1–4		3rd
2021	AFC Cup	Group J	(Hong Kong) Eastern	0–1		3rd
2022	AFC Cup	Group J	(Hong Kong) Lee Man	1–3		3rd
2022	AFC Cup	Group J	(Hong Kong) Eastern	1–3		3rd
2023–24	AFC Cup	Group I	(Mongolia) Ulaanbaatar	3–0	1–3	3rd
2023–24	AFC Cup	Group I	(Macau) Chao Pak Kei	4–2	1–4	3rd
2023–24	AFC Cup	Group I	(Chinese Taipei) Taichung Futuro	5–1	1–2	3rd
2024–25	AFC Challenge League	Group D	(Myanmar) Shan United	2–2		2nd
2024–25	AFC Challenge League	Group D	(Laos) Young Elephants	3–2		2nd
2024–25	AFC Challenge League	Quarter-finals	(Indonesia) Madura United	0–0	0–3	0–3
2025–26	AFC Challenge League	Preliminary stage	(Mongolia) Khangarid	4–1		
2025–26	AFC Challenge League	Group E	(Myanmar) Shan United	2–1		3rd
2025–26	AFC Challenge League	Group E	(Indonesia) Dewa United Banten	0–4		3rd
2025–26	AFC Challenge League	Group E	(Cambodia) Phnom Penh Crown	2–3		3rd
2026–27	AFC Challenge League	Preliminary stage	(Mongolia) Central Stallions	2–2 (a.e.t.) (5–3 p)		
2026–27	AFC Challenge League	Group D	(Indonesia) Borneo	1–3		2nd
2026–27	AFC Challenge League	Group D	(Myanmar) Yangon United	1–1		2nd
2026–27	AFC Challenge League	Quarter-finals	(Philippines) Manila Digger			

== Honours ==
=== Domestic ===
- Taiwan Football Premier League
  - Champions (5): 2020, 2021, 2022, 2023, 2024, 2025–26
- Taiwan President FA Cup
  - Champions (1): 2025
