= Ming Chuan University F.C. =

Taiwanese football club

Ming Chuan University
- Full name: Ming Chuan University Football Club
- Nickname: Ming Chuan
- Founded: 1992; 34 years ago
- Ground: Ming Chuan University Stadium
- Capacity: 5,000
- Owner: Ming Chuan University
- Head coach: Tseng Tai-lin
- League: Taiwan Football League 2
- 2025–26: TFPL, 8th of 8 (relegated)
Home colours	Away colours

Ming Chuan University Football Club, commonly known by their abbreviation MCU, is a Taiwanese university football club which currently competes in the Taiwan Football League 2. The club plays their home matches on the Taoyuan campus of Ming Chuan University.

== Players ==
Note: Flags indicate national team as defined under FIFA eligibility rules; some limited exceptions apply. Players may hold more than one non-FIFA nationality.

No.	Pos.	Nation	Player
1	GK	TPE	Kang Ho-hsiang
2		TPE	Lin Tzu-yu
4		TPE	Lin Min-tung
5	DF	TPE	Kuo Chia-cheng
6		TPE	Chen Tsung-yen
7		TPE	Huang Sheng-hao
8	MF	TPE	Cheng Kai-wei
9	FW	TPE	Wang Hsuan
11	MF	TPE	Cheng Yu-che
12	MF	TPE	Hsiung Yuan-kuan
14		TPE	Chang Cheng-chia
16	MF	TPE	Li Po-yu
17		TPE	Hung Hsi
19	MF	TPE	Liu Chan-cheng

No.	Pos.	Nation	Player
24		TPE	Wu Chung-en
29		TPE	Lee Yung-sheng
30	FW	TPE	Hsu Yu-jen
38	FW	TPE	Chen Shih-hsun
44		TPE	Chu Chi-lung
45	MF	TPE	Liu Chih-wen
66	MF	TPE	Hu Yi-chen
69	GK	TPE	Lin Ying-chun
75	DF	TPE	Chang Yu-cheng
82		TPE	Chen Hsueh-yi
87	FW	TPE	Su Yu-che
97		TPE	Yu Yu-yi
99	MF	TPE	Chang Yu-chi

== See also ==
- Football in Taiwan
