= 2025–26 Taichung Rock season =

Taichung Rock
2025–26 season
- Head coach: ~~Chou Yu-hsuan~~ (President FA Cup); ~~Raphael Blanchon~~ (TFPL); ~~Khor Chee Keat~~ (TFPL); Yoshiharu Ezoe (TFPL)
- Main ground: Xitun Football Field
- TFPL: 5th
- President FA Cup: Quarterfinals
- Top goalscorer: League: Sora Yamauchi (7); All: Shih Jing-tang; Sora Yamauchi (7)
- Highest home attendance: 253
- Lowest home attendance: 66
- Average home league attendance: 121
- Biggest win: Taichung Rock 3–0 Ming Chuan University
- Biggest defeat: Taichung Rock 1–5 Tainan City TSG Blue; Taichung Futuro 4–0 Taichung Rock
Home colours	Away colours
- All statistics correct as of 24 May 2026.

The 2025–26 Taichung Rock season is the club's 2nd season and their 1st season in Taiwan Football Premier League. They also compete in Taiwan President FA Cup.

== Kits ==
- Supplier: Joma (2026)
- Main Sponsor: Subkarma (2025) / S.Pellegrino (2026)

== Management team ==
Position	Name
Head coach	(Japan) Yoshiharu Ezoe
Assistant coach	(Malaysia) Khor Chee Keat
Kit Manager	(Chinese Taipei) Hsu Hung-ming
Kit Manager	(Chinese Taipei) Chen Yen-chih
Athletic Trainer	(Chinese Taipei) Yao Yi-ti

- Last updated: 1 March 2026

== Players ==
N	Pos.	Nat.	Name	Age.	Since
Goalkeepers
1	GK	(Chinese Taipei)	Huang Huai-hsien	21	2025
30	GK	(Chinese Taipei)	Chen Hsuan-ting	20	2025
99	GK	(Chinese Taipei)	Tsai Yu-hsiang	24	2025
Defenders
4	DF	(Chinese Taipei)	Tsai Chun-sheng	20	2025
6	DF	(Chinese Taipei)	Sun En-chi	21	2025
12	DF	(Chinese Taipei)	Lee Yu-lin	20	2025
48	DF	(Chinese Taipei)	Wang Yi-you (captain)	26	2025
66	DF	(Chinese Taipei)	Tseng Yun-hao	23	2025
88	DF	(Chinese Taipei)	Liao Yi-sheng	22	2025
Midfielders
5	MF	(Chinese Taipei)	Chou Yu-chieh	27	2025
7	MF	(Chinese Taipei)	Kung Chih-yu	19	2025
10	MF	(Chinese Taipei)	Chang Heng	20	2026
16	MF	(Chinese Taipei)	Wei Chih-chuan	22	2025
19	MF	(Chinese Taipei)	Chou Yu-hao	20	2025
32	MF	(Chinese Taipei)	Ko Yueh-ting	21	2025
35	MF	(Chinese Taipei)	Lee Hung-chun	21	2025
37	MF	(Chinese Taipei)	Liang Hao-teng	23	2025
47	MF	(Chinese Taipei)	Kao Kuan-yu	20	2025
Forwards
2	FW	(Chinese Taipei)	Cheng Kai-yi	21	2024
9	FW	(Chinese Taipei)	Liu Chien-wei	24	2025
21	FW	(Chinese Taipei)	Ku Chieh-an	19	2025
27	FW	(Chinese Taipei)	Shih Jing-tang	22	2024
44	FW	(Japan)	Sora Yamauchi	25	2025
77	FW	(Chinese Taipei)	Lin Wei-chieh	26	2025

== Transfers ==
=== In ===
No.	Pos.	Player	Transferred from	Source
Preseason (winter transfer)
5	MF	Chou Yu-chieh	(Chinese Taipei) New Taipei Hang Yuan	
41	DF	Mehdi Karimi	–	
42	FW	Alexsandro Silva	–	
43	DF	Liao Chieh-yang	(Chinese Taipei) Hui Wen HS	
45	MF	Hu Yu-hsiang	–	
46	MF	Lee Po-yu	–	
49	FW	Chang Hsu-yang	(United States) Bellevue Athletic	
88	DF	Liao Yi-sheng	(Chinese Taipei) Taipower	
99	GK	Tsai Yu-hsiang	(Chinese Taipei) Taipower	
Preseason (summer transfer)
1	GK	Huang Huai-hsien	(Chinese Taipei) Taichung Rock B	
4	DF	Tsai Chun-sheng	(Chinese Taipei) Taichung Rock B	
6	DF	Sun En-chi	(Chinese Taipei) Taichung Rock B	
7	MF	Kung Chih-yu	(Chinese Taipei) Taichung Rock B	
9	FW	Liu Chien-wei	(Chinese Taipei) Tainan City TSG Green	
11	FW	Yang Chao-jing	(Hong Kong) Kowloon City	
12	DF	Lee Yu-lin	(Chinese Taipei) Taichung Rock B	
16	MF	Wei Chih-chuan	(Chinese Taipei) Tainan City TSG Green	
19	MF	Chou Yu-hao	(Chinese Taipei) Taichung Rock B	
21	FW	Ku Chieh-an	(Chinese Taipei) Taichung Rock B	
30	GK	Chen Hsuan-ting	(Chinese Taipei) Taichung Rock B	
32	MF	Ko Yueh-ting	(Chinese Taipei) Taichung Rock B	
35	MF	Lee Hung-chun	(Chinese Taipei) Taichung Rock B	
37	MF	Liang Hao-teng	(Chinese Taipei) Taichung Rock B	
44	FW	Sora Yamauchi	–	
47	MF	Kao Kuan-yu	(Chinese Taipei) Taichung Rock B	
48	DF	Wang Yi-you	(Chinese Taipei) Taichung Rock B	
66	DF	Tseng Yun-hao	(Chinese Taipei) Taipower	
77	FW	Lin Wei-chieh	(Chinese Taipei) Tainan City TSG Blue	
97	FW	Lin Chun-kai	(Chinese Taipei) Tainan City TSG Green	
Midseason
10	MF	Chang Heng	(Chinese Taipei) Taichung Rock B	

=== Out ===
No.	Pos.	Player	Transferred to	Source
Preseason (winter transfer)
1	GK	Huang Huai-hsien	(Chinese Taipei) Taichung Rock B	
4	DF	Tsai Chun-sheng	(Chinese Taipei) Taichung Rock B	
6	DF	Sun En-chi	(Chinese Taipei) Taichung Rock B	
7	MF	Kung Chih-yu	(Chinese Taipei) Taichung Rock B	
10	MF	Chang Heng	(Chinese Taipei) Taichung Rock B	
11	FW	Yang Chao-jing	(Hong Kong) Kowloon City	
12	DF	Lee Yu-lin	(Chinese Taipei) Taichung Rock B	
14	FW	Lee Wei-lun	(Chinese Taipei) Taichung Rock B	
15	DF	Liu Chun-yu	(Chinese Taipei) Taichung Rock B	
17	FW	Hsu Liu Chien-feng	(Chinese Taipei) Taichung Rock B	
19	MF	Chou Yu-hao	(Chinese Taipei) Taichung Rock B	
21	FW	Ku Chieh-an	(Chinese Taipei) Taichung Rock B	
23	MF	Lu En-wei	(Chinese Taipei) Taichung Rock B	
25	DF	Hsueh Jen-yu	(Chinese Taipei) Taichung Rock B	
29	MF	Chiang Chun-yao	(Chinese Taipei) Taichung Rock B	
30	GK	Chen Hsuan-ting	(Chinese Taipei) Taichung Rock B	
32	MF	Ko Yueh-ting	(Chinese Taipei) Taichung Rock B	
33	DF	Hsu Hung-ming	–	
35	MF	Lee Hung-chun	(Chinese Taipei) Taichung Rock B	
37	MF	Liang Hao-teng	(Chinese Taipei) Taichung Rock B	
47	MF	Kao Kuan-yu	(Chinese Taipei) Taichung Rock B	
Preseason (summer transfer)
8	MF	Chen Po-ying	(Chinese Taipei) Taichung Rock B	
13	DF	Chen Po-wei	(Chinese Taipei) Taichung Rock B	
18	GK	Chen Kuan-chih	(Chinese Taipei) Taichung Rock B	
20	MF	Tai Yan-yao	(Chinese Taipei) Taichung Rock B	
22	DF	Huang Yu-po	(Chinese Taipei) Taichung Rock B	
26	DF	Lin Chia-le	(Chinese Taipei) Taichung Rock B	
28	MF	Chen Chih-wei	(Chinese Taipei) Taichung Rock B	
40	DF	Lin Cheng-jui	(Chinese Taipei) Taichung Rock B	
41	DF	Mehdi Karimi	–	
42	FW	Alexsandro Silva	(Chinese Taipei) Wan Island	
43	DF	Liao Chieh-yang	(Chinese Taipei) Taipower	
45	MF	Hu Yu-hsiang	(Chinese Taipei) Taichung Rock B	
46	MF	Lee Po-yu	(Chinese Taipei) Tainan City TSG	
49	FW	Chang Hsu-yang	–	
Midseason
3	DF	Hsu Kuei	(Chinese Taipei) Taichung Rock B	
97	FW	Lin Chun-kai	(Chinese Taipei) Tatung	

=== Loans out ===
No.	Pos.	Player	Loaned to	On loan until	Source
Midseason
11	FW	Yang Chao-jing	(Hong Kong) Kowloon City	31 May 2026	

== Preseason and friendlies ==
9 February 2025 Japan training camp	Chuo Gakuin University (Japan)	2–0	(Chinese Taipei) Taichung Rock	Abiko
14:00 (UTC+9)		Recap		Stadium: Chuo Gakuin University

9 February 2025 Japan training camp	Chuo Gakuin University (Japan)	7–2	(Chinese Taipei) Taichung Rock	Abiko
16:00 (UTC+9)		Recap		Stadium: Chuo Gakuin University

10 February 2025 Japan training camp	Tokyo University of Agriculture (Japan)	6–1	(Chinese Taipei) Taichung Rock	Setagaya
14:00 (UTC+9)		Recap		Stadium: Tokyo University of Agriculture

10 February 2025 Japan training camp	Tokyo University of Agriculture (Japan)	4–1	(Chinese Taipei) Taichung Rock	Setagaya
16:00 (UTC+9)		RecapRecap		Stadium: Tokyo University of Agriculture

11 February 2025 Japan training camp	Kokugakuin University (Japan)	7–0	(Chinese Taipei) Taichung Rock	Shibuya
11:00 (UTC+9)		Recap		Stadium: Kokugakuin University

11 February 2025 Japan training camp	Kokugakuin University (Japan)	5–0	(Chinese Taipei) Taichung Rock	Shibuya
13:00 (UTC+9)		Recap		Stadium: Kokugakuin University

12 February 2025 Japan training camp	Kanto Gakuin University (Japan)	6–0	(Chinese Taipei) Taichung Rock	Yokohama
11:00 (UTC+9)		RecapRecap		Stadium: Kanto Gakuin University

12 February 2025 Japan training camp	Kanto Gakuin University (Japan)	9–0	(Chinese Taipei) Taichung Rock	Yokohama
13:00 (UTC+9)		Recap		Stadium: Kanto Gakuin University

13 February 2025 Japan training camp	Aoyama Gakuin University (Japan)	12–0	(Chinese Taipei) Taichung Rock	Shibuya
10:00 (UTC+9)		RecapRecap		Stadium: Aoyama Gakuin University

13 February 2025 Japan training camp	Aoyama Gakuin University (Japan)	1–0	(Chinese Taipei) Taichung Rock	Shibuya
12:00 (UTC+9)		RecapRecap		Stadium: Aoyama Gakuin University

14 February 2025 Japan training camp	Tokyo University of Agriculture (Japan)	4–0	(Chinese Taipei) Taichung Rock	Setagaya
11:00 (UTC+9)		Recap		Stadium: Tokyo University of Agriculture

14 February 2025 Japan training camp	Tokyo University of Agriculture (Japan)	5–2	(Chinese Taipei) Taichung Rock	Setagaya
13:00 (UTC+9)		Recap		Stadium: Tokyo University of Agriculture

14 March 2025 Friendly	Taichung Rock	3–1	Taichung Futuro	Taichung
19:30 (UTC+8)		RecapRecap		Stadium: Xitun Football Field

29 March 2025 Friendly	Taichung Rock	1–3	Sunny Bank AC Taipei	Taichung
16:00 (UTC+8)	Tsai Chun-sheng 37'	Report	Yamazaki 15'; Chen Kai-wen 49'; Lee Shih-ying 79'	Stadium: Xitun Football Field

6 April 2025 Friendly	Sunny Bank AC Taipei	2–1	Taichung Rock	Taipei
14:00 (UTC+8)	13'; 23'	Report	Chen Chih-wei 46'	Stadium: Yingfeng Riverside Park

27 July 2025 TCRFC International Cup	Taichung Rock (Chinese Taipei)	1–4	(Chinese Taipei) Taichung Futuro	Taichung
16:00 (UTC+8)	Liu Chien-wei 15'	Report	Saito 13', 43'; Cheng Hao 52'; Lai Yi-chiao 68'	Stadium: Xitun Football Field; Referee: Yang Chang-pei

29 July 2025 TCRFC International Cup	Taichung Rock (Chinese Taipei)	1–3	(Germany) Rot Weiss Ahlen	Taichung
18:45 (UTC+8)	Chen Chih-wei 21'	Report	Wöstmann 11', 17'; Heidbrink 41'	Stadium: Xitun Football Field; Referee: Liu Hsiang-shao

Not played TCRFC International Cup	Taichung Rock (Chinese Taipei)	Cancelled	(Hong Kong) Eastern	Taichung
		Report		Stadium: Xitun Football Field
Note: Matched cancelled due to poor ground condition after the rain.

== Competitions ==
=== Overall record ===
Competition	First match	Last match	Starting round	Final position	Record							
Competition	First match	Last match	Starting round	Final position	Pld	W	D	L	GF	GA	GD	Win %
TFPL	17 August 2025	24 May 2026	Matchday 1	5th	20	7	6	7	25	30	−5	35.00
President FA Cup	12 April 2025	17 May 2025	Group stage	Quarterfinals	5	2	2	1	9	11	−2	40.00
Total					25	9	8	8	34	41	−7	36.00

Source: TFPLPresident FA Cup

=== Taiwan Football Premier League ===
==== League table ====
Pos	Team	Pld	W	D	L	GF	GA	GD	Pts	Qualification or relegation
1	Tainan City TSG (C)	21	13	5	3	44	19	+25	44	Qualification for the AFC Challenge League qualifying play-offs
2	New Taipei Hang Yuan	21	13	2	6	35	15	+20	41	Qualification for the AFC Challenge League qualifying play-offs
3	Sunny Bank AC Taipei	21	11	6	4	29	22	+7	39	
4	Taichung Futuro	21	11	1	9	34	22	+12	34	
5	Taichung Rock	21	8	6	7	28	30	−2	30	
6	Tatung	21	6	6	9	27	28	−1	24	
7	Taipower	21	5	5	11	27	33	−6	20	Qualification for the 2026–27 Taiwan Football Premier League qualifiers
8	Ming Chuan University (R)	21	1	1	19	14	69	−55	4	Relegation to Taiwan Football League 2

(C) Champions; (R) Relegated

==== Results by round ====
Round	1	2	3	4	5	6	7	8	9	10	11	12	13	14	15	16	17	18	19	20	21
Result	W	L	L	D	D	D	W	L	L	W	L	D	W	D	W	W	D	W	L	L	W
Position	3	4	7	6	6	6	4	6	7	5	7	6	5	6	6	4	5	5	5	5	5

W = Win; D = Draw; L = Loss

==== Matches ====
17 August 2025 1	Taichung Rock	2–1	New Taipei Hang Yuan	Taichung
16:00 (UTC+8)	Kung Chih-yu 8'; Yamauchi 17'; Tsai Chun-sheng (yellow card) 63' (yellow-red card) 65'	Report	Kang Tae-won (yellow card) 38' (goal) 90+5'; Kaneko (yellow card) 51'	Stadium: Xitun Football Field; Attendance: 89; Referee: Kuo Chan-yu

24 August 2025 2	Taichung Rock	0–1	Taichung Futuro	Taichung
19:00 (UTC+8)	Kao Kuan-yu (yellow card) 75'	Report	Li Mao 16'; Sakurauchi (yellow card) 63'; Komori (yellow card) 83'	Stadium: Xitun Football Field; Attendance: 253; Referee: Liu Hsiang-shao

14 September 2025 3	Taichung Rock	0–2	Taipower	Taichung
19:30 (UTC+8)		Report	Hsu Po-chieh (yellow card) 23' (goal) 41'; Chen Chao-an 48'; Yeh Ching-chun (red card) 90'	Stadium: Xitun Football Field; Attendance: 182; Referee: Kuo Chia-hao

21 September 2025 4	Tatung	2–2	Taichung Rock	Tainan
16:00 (UTC+8)	Chen Shih-hsien 5'; Chen Jui-chieh 71'	Report	Wei Chih-chuan (yellow card) 13'; Kung Chih-yu 45+3'; Liu Chien-wei (yellow card) 88'; Chao Wei-chieh 90+2' (o.g.)	Stadium: Tainan Municipal Football Field; Attendance: 79; Referee: Ko Chuan-yao

28 September 2025 5	Tainan City TSG	3–3	Taichung Rock	Tainan
19:00 (UTC+8)	Fong Shao-chi 21' (yellow card) 86'; Yao Ko-chi (yellow card) 45'; Porto 47', 54'	Report	Lin Chun-kai 66'; Liu Chien-wei 74'; Lin Wei-chieh 83'	Stadium: Tainan Municipal Football Field; Attendance: 185; Referee: Kuo Chan-yu

26 October 2025 6	Sunny Bank AC Taipei	2–2	Taichung Rock	New Taipei
15:30 (UTC+8)	Kusuyama 18' (yellow card) 74'; Wang Hsiang-yi (yellow card) 29'; Chen Yu-lin (yellow card) 41'; Tuan Hsuan (yellow card) 50'; Uchida (yellow card) 73'; Yamazaki 77'	Report	Yamauchi 2', 51'; Kung Chih-yu (yellow card) 9'; Liu Chien-wei (yellow card) 56'; Lin Chun-kai (yellow card) 67'	Stadium: Fu Jen Catholic University; Attendance: 133; Referee: Lee Tsung-ying

2 November 2025 7	Ming Chuan University	0–1	Taichung Rock	Taoyuan
18:30 (UTC+8)	Li Po-yu (yellow card) 48'; Ma Liang-cheng (yellow card) 90+6'	Report	Tseng Yun-hao 52'; Huang Huai-hsien (yellow card) 90+5'; Sun En-chi (yellow card) 90+5'	Stadium: Ming Chuan University; Attendance: 184; Referee: Liu Hsiang-shao

23 November 2025 8	New Taipei Hang Yuan	3–0	Taichung Rock	New Taipei
18:30 (UTC+8)	Lee Hung-chun 16' (o.g.); Koreeda 33'; Wang Po-ying 56'	Report		Stadium: Fu Jen Catholic University; Attendance: 96; Referee: Chen Hsin-chuan

30 November 2025 9	Taichung Futuro	4–0	Taichung Rock	Taichung
18:30 (UTC+8)	Saito 42', 65'; Li Mao (yellow card) 48'; Chen Hung-wei 64'; Cheng Hao 79'	Report	Yamauchi (yellow card) 66'	Stadium: Xitun Football Field; Attendance: 219; Referee: Lin Te-en

7 December 2025 10	Taipower	1–2	Taichung Rock	Tainan
15:30 (UTC+8)	Kao Wei-chieh 11' (yellow card) 45'; Chen Chao-an (yellow card) 30'; Tu Shao-chieh (yellow card) 38'; Huang Tzu-ming (yellow card) 66'; Chao Ming-hsiu (yellow card) 80'	Report	Wang Yi-you (yellow card) 10'; Yamauchi 18'; Lin Chun-kai (yellow card) 22'; Lee Yu-lin 27' (yellow card) 45'	Stadium: Tainan Municipal Football Field; Attendance: 815; Referee: Liu Hsiang-shao

14 December 2025 11	Taichung Rock	0–1	Tatung	Taichung
15:30 (UTC+8)	Chou Yu-chieh (yellow card) 88'	Report	Chen Shih-hsien (yellow card) 42'; Fukasawa (yellow card) 54'; Yu Chia-huang 58' (yellow card) 90+3'	Stadium: Xitun Football Field; Attendance: 90; Referee: Lin Te-en

21 December 2026 12	Taichung Rock	0–0	Tainan City TSG	Kaohsiung
15:30 (UTC+8)	Sun En-chi (yellow card) 40'; Kao Kuan-yu (yellow card) 72'; Chou Yu-chieh (yellow card) 78'	Report	Sakkouh (yellow card) 35' (yellow-red card) 87'; Wang Ruei (yellow card) 52'; Kuo Po-wei (yellow card) 85'	Stadium: Kaohsiung Nanzih Football Stadium; Attendance: 179; Referee: Kuo Chan-yu

1 March 2026 13	Taichung Rock	3–1	Sunny Bank AC Taipei	Taichung
18:30 (UTC+8)	Liu Chien-wei 8'; Yamauchi 37'; Kao Kuan-yu 71'; Tsai Chun-sheng (yellow card) 81'; Wang Yi-you (yellow card) 89'	Report	Huang Wei-chieh 13'; Tsai Meng-chen (yellow card) 22'; Arreaga (yellow card) 90+2'	Stadium: Xitun Football Field; Attendance: 75; Referee: Lin Te-en

8 March 2026 14	Taichung Rock	1–1	Ming Chuan University	Taichung
18:30 (UTC+8)	Chou Yu-chieh (yellow card) 45'; Tseng Yun-hao (yellow card) 45'; Liu Chien-wei 51'; Yamauchi (yellow card) 55'	Report	Hsu Yu-jen 16'; Chang Yu-cheng (yellow card) 42'	Stadium: Xitun Football Field; Attendance: 102; Referee: Kuo Chia-hao

12 April 2026 15	New Taipei Hang Yuan	0–2	Taichung Rock	Taoyuan
15:30 (UTC+8)		Report	Huang Chun-lin 6' (o.g.); Lee Hung-chun 45+1'; Tsai Chun-sheng (yellow card) 78'; Shih Jing-tang (yellow card) 90+4'; Wang Yi-you (yellow card) 90+4'	Stadium: Ming Chuan University; Attendance: 104; Referee: Chen Chia-hao

19 April 2026 16	Taichung Futuro	0–1	Taichung Rock	Taichung
18:30 (UTC+8)	Liang Meng-hsin (yellow card) 89'	Report	Lee Hung-chun (yellow card) 66'; Tseng Yun-hao 90'	Stadium: Xitun Football Field; Attendance: 203; Referee: Ko Chuan-yao

26 April 2026 17	Taichung Rock	2–2	Taipower	Taichung
15:30 (UTC+8)	Chou Yu-chieh (yellow card) 34'; Shih Jing-tang (yellow card) 61'; Liu Chien-wei 72'; Lin Wei-chieh 90+7'	Report	Chen Chao-an (yellow card) 19' (yellow-red card) 42'; Lin Chen 30'; Lai Wei 59'	Stadium: Xitun Football Field; Attendance: 116; Referee: Liu Hsiang-shao

3 May 2026 18	Taichung Rock	1–0	Tatung	Taichung
16:00 (UTC+8)	Yamauchi 62'; Wang Yi-you (yellow card) 90+9'	Report	Lin Chih-hsuan (yellow card) 67'; Lin Po-hen (yellow card) 90+8'	Stadium: Xitun Football Field; Attendance: 105; Referee: Kuo Chan-yu

10 May 2026 19	Taichung Rock	2–4	Tainan City TSG	Kaohsiung
16:00 (UTC+8)	Liu Chien-wei 16'; Yamauchi 49'; Cheng Kai-yi (yellow card) 75'	Report	Kim Sang-jun 3', 23'; Benchy 18'; Chen Wei-jen (yellow card) 58'; Fong Shao-chi (yellow card) 64'; Wu Chun-ching 90'; Yao Ko-chi (yellow card) 90+1'	Stadium: Kaohsiung Nanzih Football Stadium; Attendance: 102; Referee: Ko Chuan-yao

17 May 2026 20	Taichung Rock	1–2	Sunny Bank AC Taipei	Taichung
16:00 (UTC+8)	Lee Yu-lin (yellow card) 27'; Lee Hung-chun (yellow card) 57'; Chou Yu-chieh 90+7'	Report	Huang Wei-chieh 53'; Chen Yen-jui (yellow card) 57'; Uchida 68'	Stadium: Xitun Football Field; Attendance: 89; Referee: Liu Hsiang-shao

24 May 2026 21	Taichung Rock	3–0	Ming Chuan University	Taichung
19:00 (UTC+8)	Tsai Chun-sheng (yellow card) 33'; Chang Heng 42'; Shih Jing-tang 70', 82' (yellow card) 81'	Report	Yu Yu-yi (yellow card) 45'; Godoy (yellow card) 55'; Vergara (yellow card) 72'	Stadium: Xitun Football Field; Attendance: 66; Referee: Yang Chang-pei

=== Taiwan President FA Cup ===
==== Group stage ====
Pos	Team	Pld	W	D	L	GF	GA	GD	Pts	Qualification
1	Tainan City TSG Blue	4	4	0	0	19	4	+15	12	Advanced to Quarterfinals
2	Taichung Rock	4	2	1	1	8	10	−2	7	Advanced to Quarterfinals
3	Sunny Bank AC Taipei Reserves	4	1	1	2	11	10	+1	4	
4	New Taipei FJCU	4	1	1	2	7	12	−5	4	
5	NUK Kuo Kuang	4	0	1	3	6	15	−9	1	

12 April 2025 1	Taichung Rock	2−1	New Taipei FJCU	Taichung
19:30 (UTC+8)	Liao Yi-sheng (yellow card) 23'; Chen Po-wei 36'; Shih Jing-tang 45+1'; Tsai Yu-hsiang (yellow card) 88'; Tai Yan-yao (yellow card) 90+5'	Recap	Chen Yu-hsun (yellow card) 54'; Wang Hao-lin (yellow card) 78'; Pan Yen-hung 90+3'; Chang Wen-hsiang (yellow card) 90+3'	Stadium: Xitun Football Field; Referee: Liu Hsiang-shao

26 April 2025 2	Sunny Bank AC Taipei Reserves	2−3	Taichung Rock	Kaohsiung
13:00 (UTC+8)	Chen Yu-heng 27', 43'	Recap	Cheng Kai-yi 31'; Liao Yi-sheng (yellow card) 45'; Shih Jing-tang 58' (pen.) (yellow card) 87'; Chen Chih-wei 64'; Lin Chia-le (yellow card) 68' (yellow-red card) 82'	Stadium: National University of Kaohsiung

4 May 2025 3	Taichung Rock	1−5	Tainan City TSG Blue	Taichung
18:00 (UTC+8)	Chou Yu-chieh 51'	Recap	Yao Ko-chi 2'; Chen Po-ying 4' (o.g.); Liao Yi-sheng 8' (o.g.); Jatta 59'; Chen Jui-chieh 63'; Sakkouh (yellow card) 65'	Stadium: Xitun Football Field; Referee: Liu Hsiang-shao

11 May 2025 4	Taichung Rock	2−2	NUK Kuo Kuang	Taichung
18:00 (UTC+8)	Shih Jing-tang 80', 90+3'	Recap	Chen Pen-hsiu (yellow card) 27'; Wang Cheng-hsiang (yellow card) 43'; Wu Yu-hua (yellow card) 63'; Yang Tsung-yi (yellow card) 70'; Huang Chih-hao 85'; Huang Chao-chung 90+4'	Stadium: Xitun Football Field

==== Knockout stage ====
17 May 2025 Quarterfinals	Taipower	1−1 (4–2 p)	Taichung Rock	Taoyuan
15:30 (UTC+8)	Yeh Ching-chun 50'	Recap	Shih Jing-tang 82'; Tai Yan-yao (yellow card) 88'	Stadium: National Taiwan Sport University; Referee: Liu Hsiang-shao
	Penalties
	Chen Chao-an (penalty scored); Tu Shao-chieh (penalty scored); Yeh Ching-chun (penalty scored); Lee Hsiang-wei (penalty scored)		(penalty scored) Chen Chih-wei; (penalty missed) Cheng Kai-yi; (penalty missed) Liao Yi-sheng; (penalty scored) Liao Chieh-yang

== Statistics ==
=== Goalscorers ===
Rank	No.	Pos.	Nat.	Player	TMFL	President FA Cup	Total
1	27	FW	(Chinese Taipei)	Shih Jing-tang	2	5	7
1	44	FW	(Japan)	Sora Yamauchi	7	—	7
3	9	FW	(Chinese Taipei)	Liu Chien-wei	5	—	5
4	5	MF	(Chinese Taipei)	Chou Yu-chieh	1	1	2
4	7	MF	(Chinese Taipei)	Kung Chih-yu	2	—	2
4	66	DF	(Chinese Taipei)	Tseng Yun-hao	2	—	2
4	77	FW	(Chinese Taipei)	Lin Wei-chieh	2	—	2
8	2	FW	(Chinese Taipei)	Cheng Kai-yi	0	1	1
8	10	MF	(Chinese Taipei)	Chang Heng	1	—	1
8	12	DF	(Chinese Taipei)	Lee Yu-lin	1	—	1
8	13	DF	(Chinese Taipei)	Chen Po-wei	—	1	1
8	28	MF	(Chinese Taipei)	Chen Chih-wei	—	1	1
8	35	MF	(Chinese Taipei)	Lee Hung-chun	1	—	1
8	47	MF	(Chinese Taipei)	Kao Kuan-yu	1	—	1
8	97	FW	(Chinese Taipei)	Lin Chun-kai	1	—	1
Own goals (from the opponents)					2	0	2
Totals					28	9	37

=== Cleansheets ===
Rank	No.	Nat.	Player	TMFL	President FA Cup	Total
1	99	(Chinese Taipei)	Tsai Yu-hsiang	4	0	4
2	1	(Chinese Taipei)	Huang Huai-hsien	2	—	2
3	18	(Chinese Taipei)	Chen Kuan-chih	—	—	0
3	30	(Chinese Taipei)	Chen Hsuan-ting	0	—	0
Totals				6	0	6

=== Disciplinary record ===
No.	Pos.	Nat.	Name	TFPL			President FA Cup			Total		
No.	Pos.	Nat.	Name	Booked	(yellow card) (yellow-red card)	Sent off (straight red)	Booked	(yellow card) (yellow-red card)	Sent off (straight red)	Booked	(yellow card) (yellow-red card)	Sent off (straight red)
5	MF	(Chinese Taipei)	Chou Yu-chieh	4						4		
48	DF	(Chinese Taipei)	Wang Yi-you	4						4		
27	FW	(Chinese Taipei)	Shih Jing-tang	3			1			4		
4	DF	(Chinese Taipei)	Tsai Chun-sheng	3	1					3	1	
6	DF	(Chinese Taipei)	Sun En-chi	2						2		
9	FW	(Chinese Taipei)	Liu Chien-wei	2						2		
12	DF	(Chinese Taipei)	Lee Yu-lin	2						2		
35	MF	(Chinese Taipei)	Lee Hung-chun	2						2		
44	FW	(Japan)	Sora Yamauchi	2						2		
47	MF	(Chinese Taipei)	Kao Kuan-yu	2						2		
97	FW	(Chinese Taipei)	Lin Chun-kai	2						2		
20	MF	(Chinese Taipei)	Tai Yan-yao				2			2		
88	DF	(Chinese Taipei)	Liao Yi-sheng				2			2		
1	GK	(Chinese Taipei)	Huang Huai-hsien	1						1		
2	FW	(Chinese Taipei)	Cheng Kai-yi	1						1		
7	MF	(Chinese Taipei)	Kung Chih-yu	1						1		
16	MF	(Chinese Taipei)	Wei Chih-chuan	1						1		
66	MF	(Chinese Taipei)	Tseng Yun-hao	1						1		
99	GK	(Chinese Taipei)	Tsai Yu-hsiang				1			1		
26	DF	(Chinese Taipei)	Lin Chia-le					1			1	
Head coach		(Japan)	Yoshiharu Ezoe	1						1		
Staff		(Chinese Taipei)	Lee Feng-lin	1						1		
Totals				33	1		6	1		39	2	

Ordered by (red card) , (second yellow card) and (yellow card)
(yellow card) = Number of bookings; (second yellow card) = Number of sending offs after a second yellow card; (red card) = Number of sending offs by a direct red card.
