= 2024 Taichung Rock season =

Taichung Rock
2024 season
- Chairman: Feng Shih-wen
- Head coach: Lin Chi-fu
- Main ground: Xitun Football Field
- Division 2: 1st (promoted)
- Top goalscorer: League: Yang Chao-jing (9); All: Yang Chao-jing (9)
- Biggest win: MCU Desafio 0–9 Taichung Rock
- Biggest defeat: Taichung Rock 1–4 Inter Taoyuan

The 2024 Taichung Rock season is the club's 1st season and their 1st season in Taiwan Second Division Football League.

On 7 December 2024, they won the 2024 Taiwan Football League Division 2 champions, led them to earn direct promotion to Taiwan Football Premier League for the 2025–26 season.

== Kits ==
- Main Sponsor: Subkarma

== Players ==
N	Pos.	Nat.	Name	Age.	Since
Goalkeepers
1	GK	(Chinese Taipei)	Huang Huai-hsien	20	2024
18	GK	(Chinese Taipei)	Chen Kuan-chih	18	2024
30	GK	(Chinese Taipei)	Chen Hsuan-ting	18	2024
Defenders
3	DF	(Chinese Taipei)	Hsu Kuei	18	2024
4	DF	(Chinese Taipei)	Tsai Chun-sheng	18	2024
6	DF	(Chinese Taipei)	Sun En-chi	20	2024
12	DF	(Chinese Taipei)	Lee Yu-lin	19	2024
13	DF	(Chinese Taipei)	Chen Po-wei	21	2024
15	DF	(Chinese Taipei)	Liu Chun-yu	22	2024
22	DF	(Chinese Taipei)	Huang Yu-po	20	2024
25	DF	(Chinese Taipei)	Hsueh Jen-yu	20	2024
26	DF	(Chinese Taipei)	Lin Chia-le	20	2024
33	DF	(Chinese Taipei)	Hsu Hung-ming	19	2024
40	DF	(Chinese Taipei)	Lin Cheng-jui	21	2024
Midfielders
7	MF	(Chinese Taipei)	Kung Chih-yu	18	2024
8	MF	(Chinese Taipei)	Chen Po-ying	21	2024
10	MF	(Chinese Taipei)	Chang Heng	18	2024
19	MF	(Chinese Taipei)	Chou Yu-hao	19	2024
20	MF	(Chinese Taipei)	Tai Yan-yao	18	2024
23	MF	(Chinese Taipei)	Lu En-wei	20	2024
28	MF	(Chinese Taipei)	Chen Chih-wei	21	2024
29	MF	(Chinese Taipei)	Chiang Chun-yao	22	2024
32	MF	(Chinese Taipei)	Ko Yueh-ting	20	2024
35	MF	(Chinese Taipei)	Lee Hung-chun	20	2024
37	MF	(Chinese Taipei)	Liang Hao-teng	21	2024
47	MF	(Chinese Taipei)	Kao Kuan-yu	19	2024
Forwards
2	FW	(Chinese Taipei)	Cheng Kai-yi	19	2024
11	FW	(Chinese Taipei)	Yang Chao-jing (captain)	19	2024
14	FW	(Chinese Taipei)	Lee Wei-lun	22	2024
17	FW	(Chinese Taipei)	Hsu Liu Chien-feng	18	2024
21	FW	(Chinese Taipei)	Ku Chieh-an	18	2024
27	FW	(Chinese Taipei)	Shih Jing-tang	21	2024

== Transfers ==
=== In ===
No.	Pos.	Player	Transferred from	Source
Preseason
1	GK	Huang Huai-hsien	(Chinese Taipei) Land Home NTUS	
2	FW	Cheng Kai-yi	(Chinese Taipei) Land Home NTUS	
3	DF	Hsu Kuei	(Chinese Taipei) Yilan Senior High School	
4	DF	Tsai Chun-sheng	(Chinese Taipei) Hui Wen High School	
6	DF	Sun En-chi	(Chinese Taipei) Land Home NTUS	
7	MF	Kung Chih-yu	(Chinese Taipei) Chung Shan Industrial and Commercial School	
8	MF	Chen Po-ying	(Chinese Taipei) Land Home NTUS	
10	MF	Chang Heng	(Chinese Taipei) Hualien Senior High School	
11	FW	Yang Chao-jing	(Chinese Taipei) Hui Wen High School	
12	DF	Lee Yu-lin	(Chinese Taipei) Land Home NTUS	
13	DF	Chen Po-wei	(Chinese Taipei) Land Home NTUS	
14	FW	Lee Wei-lun	(Chinese Taipei) Land Home NTUS	
15	DF	Liu Chun-yu	(Chinese Taipei) Land Home NTUS	
17	FW	Hsu Liu Chien-feng	(Chinese Taipei) Hualien Senior High School	
18	GK	Chen Kuan-chih	(Chinese Taipei) Chung Shan Industrial and Commercial School	
19	MF	Chou Yu-hao	(Chinese Taipei) Hualien Senior High School	
20	MF	Tai Yan-yao	(Chinese Taipei) Hualien Vocational High School of Agriculture	
21	FW	Ku Chieh-an	(Chinese Taipei) Yilan Senior High School	
22	DF	Huang Yu-po	(Chinese Taipei) Land Home NTUS	
23	MF	Lu En-wei	(Chinese Taipei) Land Home NTUS	
25	DF	Hsueh Jen-yu	(Chinese Taipei) Land Home NTUS	
26	DF	Lin Chia-le	(Chinese Taipei) Land Home NTUS	
27	FW	Shih Jing-tang	(Chinese Taipei) Land Home NTUS	
28	MF	Chen Chih-wei	(Chinese Taipei) Land Home NTUS	
29	MF	Chiang Chun-yao	(Chinese Taipei) Land Home NTUS	
30	GK	Chen Hsuan-ting	(Chinese Taipei) Hui Wen High School	
32	MF	Ko Yueh-ting	(Chinese Taipei) Land Home NTUS	
33	DF	Hsu Hung-ming	(Chinese Taipei) Land Home NTUS	
35	MF	Lee Hung-chun	(Chinese Taipei) Land Home NTUS	
37	MF	Liang Hao-teng	(Chinese Taipei) Land Home NTUS	
40	DF	Lin Cheng-jui	(Chinese Taipei) Land Home NTUS	
47	MF	Kao Kuan-yu	(Chinese Taipei) Hualien Senior High School	

== Preseason and friendlies ==
22 October 2024 Hong Kong training camp	Citizen (Hong Kong)	0–4	(Chinese Taipei) Taichung Rock	Tai Po
21:30 (UTC+8)		Recap		Stadium: Kwong Fuk Park

24 October 2024 Hong Kong training camp	Sham Shui Po (Hong Kong)	1–5	(Chinese Taipei) Taichung Rock	Sha Tin
21:30 (UTC+8)		Recap		Stadium: Jockey Club Kitchee Centre

== Competitions ==
=== Overall record ===
Competition	Starting round	Final position	Record							
Competition	Starting round	Final position	Pld	W	D	L	GF	GA	GD	Win %
Division 2	Matchday 1	Winners	10	7	1	2	32	10	+22	70.00
Total			10	7	1	2	32	10	+22	70.00

=== Taiwan Football League Division 2 ===
==== League table ====
Pos	Team	Pld	W	D	L	GF	GA	GD	Pts	Qualification or relegation
1	Taichung Rock (C, P)	10	7	1	2	32	10	+22	22	Promoted to Taiwan Football Premier League
2	NUK Kuo Kuang	10	6	3	1	18	7	+11	21	
3	Inter Taoyuan	10	5	2	3	17	11	+6	17	Qualified to 2025–26 TFPL promotion/relegation playoffs
4	MCU Desafio	10	3	1	6	10	24	−14	10	
5	Taipei Elite	10	2	2	6	22	36	−14	8	
6	Sunny Bank AC Taipei Reserves	10	2	1	7	11	22	−11	7	

(C) Champions; (P) Promoted

==== Results by round ====
Round	1	2	3	4	5	6	7	8	9	10
Result	W	L	L	W	W	W	W	W	D	W
Position	1	3	3	3	3	1	1	1	1	1

W = Win; D = Draw; L = Loss

==== Matches ====
24 August 2024 1	Taipei Elite	1–6	Taichung Rock	Taipei
16:30 (UTC+8)	Calderon 56'		Yang Chao-jing 4', 59', 74', 80'; Lee Hung-chun 15'; 34' (o.g.)	Stadium: Yingfeng Riverside Park

14 September 2024 2	Taichung Rock	1–4	Inter Taoyuan	Taichung
15:00 (UTC+8)	Kao Kuan-yu 86'		Rabre 28'; Hsu Han 36'; Zabramba 38', 70'	Stadium: Xitun Football Field

21 September 2024 3	Taichung Rock	0–1	MCU Desafio	Taichung
15:00 (UTC+8)			Liao Chien-hsiung 68'	Stadium: Xitun Football Field

28 September 2024 4	Taichung Rock	1–0	NUK Kuo Kuang	Kaohsiung
15:00 (UTC+8)				Stadium: National University of Kaohsiung

5 October 2024 5	Sunny Bank AC Taipei Reserves	0–3	Taichung Rock	Taichung
15:00 (UTC+8)			Kao Kuan-yu 75', 84'; Ko Yueh-ting 90+4'	Stadium: Xitun Football Field

2 November 2024 6	Inter Taoyuan	1–2	Taichung Rock	Taipei
14:00 (UTC+8)	Meftah 81'		Yang Chao-jing 62'; Liang Hao-teng 63'	Stadium: Yingfeng Riverside Park

9 November 2024 7	Taichung Rock	6–2	Taipei Elite	Taichung
15:00 (UTC+8)	Tsai Chun-sheng 6'; Lee Hung-chun 11'; Yang Chao-jing 48'; Chiang Chun-yao 79', 88'; Hsu Liu Chien-feng 90'		Carter 50'; Calderon 73'	Stadium: Xitun Football Field

16 November 2024 8	Taichung Rock	3–0	Sunny Bank AC Taipei Reserves	Taipei
19:00 (UTC+8)	Kao Kuan-yu 27'; Kung Chih-yu 63'; Lee Wei-lun 90+5' (pen.)			Stadium: Yingfeng Riverside Park

23 November 2024 9	NUK Kuo Kuang	1–1	Taichung Rock	Kaohsiung
15:00 (UTC+8)	Huang Yi-han 9'		Kao Kuan-yu 38'	Stadium: National University of Kaohsiung

7 December 2024 10	MCU Desafio	0–9	Taichung Rock	Taipei
19:00 (UTC+8)				Stadium: Yingfeng Riverside Park

== Awards ==
Player	Position	Award	Ref.
(Chinese Taipei) Yang Chao-jing	Forward	Golden Boot	
(Chinese Taipei) Lin Chi-fu	Head coach	Coach of the Year	
