= 2025–26 Taiwan Football League 2 =

Taiwan Football League 2
- Season: 2025–26
- Dates: 13 September 2025 – 9 May 2026
- Champions: Kaohsiung Attackers (1st title)
- Promoted: Kaohsiung Attackers
- Matches: 42
- Goals: 147 (3.5 per match)
- Top goalscorer: Luan Anderson; Hsu Liu Chien-feng (8 goals)
- Best goalkeeper: Yu Sen-chiao
- Biggest home win: Sunny Bank AC Taipei Reserves 6–0 Wan Island (25 April 2026)
- Biggest away win: Wan Island 0–8 Kaohsiung Attackers (22 November 2025)
- Highest scoring: New Taipei FJCU 7–2 Wan Island (13 September 2025); Wan Island 2–7 Taichung Rock B (25 October 2025)
- Longest winning run: Kaohsiung Attackers; Sunny Bank AC Taipei Reserves (4 matches)
- Longest unbeaten run: Kaohsiung Attackers (10 matches)
- Longest winless run: Wan Island (12 matches)
- Longest losing run: Wan Island (12 matches)
- All statistics correct as of 9 May 2026.

The 2025–26 Taiwan Football League 2 is the sixth season of Taiwan Football League 2. Starting from this season, the league will change to July-June season format. The season begin on 13 September 2025 and finish on 9 May 2026.

== Teams ==
=== Promotions and relegations ===
There are 7 teams in the league, including 3 teams from the 2024 season, 3 teams from 2025 Taiwan President FA Cup, which was the qualifier of 2025–26 Taiwan Football League 2 and 1 team via receiving the playing spot transference.

==== Incoming teams ====
Taipei Vikings finished last place in the 2024 Taiwan Football Premier League and was relegated automatically but did not participate in 2025 Taiwan President FA Cup, led them to forfeit their playing spot in League 2 for the 2025–26 season. Four playing spots were eligible due to the league expansion to 8 teams this season. However, only three qualified teams, which were New Taipei FJCU, Taichung Rock B and Wan Island had signed up eventually. Kaohsiung Attackers had received their playing spot from NUK Kuo Kuang.

==== Outgoing teams ====
Taichung Rock, the champions of 2024 League 2 earned automatic promotion to the Taiwan Football Premier League. Taipei Elite, finishing 5th in 2024 season didn't participate in 2025 Taiwan President FA Cup. NUK Kuo Kuang had transferred their playing spot to Kaohsiung Attackers.

Incoming teams	Outgoing teams
Kaohsiung Attackers; New Taipei FJCU; Taichung Rock B Wan Island	NUK Kuo Kuang; Taichung Rock; Taipei Elite

=== Teams and locations ===
Team	Chinese	Based in	Seasons in League 2	First season in League 2
Inter Taoyuan	桃園國際	Taoyuan City	6	2020
Kaohsiung Attackers	高雄Attackers	Kaohsiung City	1	2025–26
MCU Desafio	銘傳Desafio	Taipei City	2	2024
New Taipei FJCU	新北航源輔大	New Taipei City	1	2025–26
Sunny Bank AC Taipei Reserves	陽信北競預備隊	Taipei City	3	2023
Taichung Rock B	台中磐石預備隊	Taichung City	1	2025–26
Wan Island	灣島	Taichung City	1	2025–26

=== Venues ===
Taiwan Football League 2 teams currently don't have their own home grounds. Each ground may hold 1 to 3 matches per matchday.

Location of venues in 2025–26 Taiwan Football League 2

Stadium	Chinese	Location	Capacity
Fu Jen Catholic University Stadium	輔仁大學足球場	New Taipei City	3,000
Kaohsiung Nanzih Football Stadium	高雄市立楠梓足球場	Kaohsiung City	1,200
National Taiwan Sport University Football Field	國體人工足球場	Taoyuan City	3,000
Xitun Football Field	西屯足球場	Taichung City	200
Yingfeng Riverside Park	迎風河濱公園	Taipei City	100

=== Foreign players ===
- Players name in **bold** indicates the player was registered during the mid-season transfer window.

Inter Taoyuan	Kaohsiung Attackers	MCU Desafio	New Taipei FJCU	Sunny Bank AC Taipei Reserves	Taichung Rock B	Wan Island
**(South Korea) An Sang-jin** **(South Korea) Choi Gyu-min** **(South Korea) Hwang Tae-gyu** **(South Korea) Lee Kyoung-hoon** (France) Zacchary Meftah (Guatemala) Gerardo Rabre (Japan) Genki Takatera	(Brazil) Luan Anderson (Philippines) Junell Bautista (Morocco) Soufiane Khoulal (Brazil) Otavio Neto (Japan) Kotaro Shiba (Russia) Alim Zumakulov	~~(Bulgaria) Coden Assenov~~ (Japan) Kaito Kita (Japan) Taiki Kita (Japan) Tsubasa Tanaka	—N/a	(Japan) Takumi Akutsu (Guatemala) Rodrigo Calderon (Guatemala) José Gallardo (Japan) Kotaro Hayashi (Japan) Sota Kano **(Japan) Kenshin Katata**; ~~(South Korea) Lee Jeong-cheol~~	—N/a	~~(Yemen) Esmail Al-Sumaini~~ (Yemen) Mahdi Alsumaini **(Eswatini) Thabiso Dlamini** (Eswatini) Mnisi Mpendulo; ~~(Brazil) Alexsandro Silva~~

=== Personnel and sponsorship ===
Team	Manager	Captain	Kit manufacturer	Main kit sponsor
Inter Taoyuan	(Taiwan) Lin Hsin-yu	(Guatemala) Gerardo Rabre	(Italy) Kappa	Taoyuan City Government
Kaohsiung Attackers	(Taiwan) Weng Wei-pin	(Chinese Taipei) Chan Che-yuan	(Japan) Athleta	Matrix Fitness
MCU Desafio	(Japan) Shota Negishi	(Chinese Taipei) Chiang Tsung-yu	(Japan) Athleta	ASRock
New Taipei FJCU	(Taiwan) Lee Yi-sheng	(Chinese Taipei) Wang Hao-lin	(China) Ucan	—N/a
Sunny Bank AC Taipei Reserves	(Spain) Ángel Oliveira	(Chinese Taipei) Tsai Meng-tzu	(China) Ucan	Sunny Bank
Taichung Rock B	(Japan) Yoshiharu Ezoe	(Chinese Taipei) Chen Po-wei	(Spain) Joma	S.Pellegrino
Wan Island	(Taiwan) Liao Tzu-hao	(Chinese Taipei) Cheng Chih-chia	(Spain) Joma	—N/a

== League table ==
Pos	Team	Pld	W	D	L	GF	GA	GD	Pts	Qualification or relegation
1	Kaohsiung Attackers (C, P)	12	8	3	1	30	8	+22	27	Promotion to the Taiwan Football Premier League
2	Sunny Bank AC Taipei Reserves (Note: Sunny Bank AC Taipei Reserves could not participate in the play-offs as they are Sunny Bank AC Taipei reserve team, so the third positioned team qualified for the play-offs.)	12	7	2	3	31	14	+17	23	
3	MCU Desafio	12	5	4	3	18	10	+8	19	Qualification for the promotion–relegation playoffs
4	Taichung Rock B	12	5	2	5	27	25	+2	17 (Note: Ranked on head-to-head goal difference: Taichung Rock B +2, New Taipei FJCU –2)	
5	New Taipei FJCU	12	5	2	5	20	21	−1	17	
6	Inter Taoyuan	12	3	5	4	13	10	+3	14	
7	Wan Island	12	0	0	12	8	59	−51	0	Qualification for the Taiwan Football League 2 qualifiers

Rules for classification: 1) Points; 2) Head-to-head points; 3) Head-to-head goal difference; 4) Head-to-head goals scored; 5) Overall goal difference; 6) Overall goals scored; 7) Fewer disciplinary points; 8) Draw lots
(C) Champions; (P) Promoted

=== Position by round ===
Team ╲ Round	1	2	3	4	5	6	7	8	9	10	11	12	13	14
Inter Taoyuan	2	2	4	5	6	5	5	6	6	6	6	6	6	6
Kaohsiung Attackers	3	3	2	3	3	1	1	1	1	1	1	1	1	1
MCU Desafio	3	4	3	4	5	6	4	5	5	4	5	5	5	3
New Taipei FJCU	1	1	1	1	1	3	2	2	3	2	4	4	4	5
Sunny Bank AC Taipei Reserves	6	5	6	6	4	4	6	3	4	5	3	2	2	2
Taichung Rock B	5	6	5	2	2	2	3	4	2	3	2	3	3	4
Wan Island	7	7	7	7	7	7	7	7	7	7	7	7	7	7

= Promotion to the Taiwan Football Premier League; = Qualification for the promotion–relegation playoffs; = Qualification for the Taiwan Football League 2 qualifiers

== Results ==
=== Qualifying result in 2025 Taiwan President FA Cup ===
Pos	Team	Pld	W	D	L	GF	GA	GD	Pts	Qualifying result
4	Tainan City TSG Green	6	4	0	2	22	9	+13	12	Qualified but didn't sign up
9	Taichung Rock B	4	2	0	2	17	8	+9	6	Qualified
11	Hsinchu Xinyi Cosmos United	4	2	0	2	7	18	-11	6	Qualified but didn't sign up
13	New Taipei FJCU	4	1	1	2	7	12	-5	4	Qualified
15	Inter Taipei	4	0	1	3	2	9	-7	1	Qualified but didn't sign up
18	Wan Island	4	0	1	3	2	18	-16	1	Qualified
19	Babuza	4	0	1	3	1	23	-22	1	Qualified but didn't sign up
20	Inter Taoyuan Grey	4	0	1	3	0	22	-22	1	Ineligible

=== Regular season ===
Each team plays a total of 12 games, playing the other teams two times.

Home \ Away	INT	KHA	MCU	NWT	SAC	TCR	WAN
Inter Taoyuan	—	0–1	0–0	1–1	1–0	1–1	1–0
Kaohsiung Attackers	1–0	—	1–1	0–1	4–0	4–1	1–0
MCU Desafio	1–1	2–2	—	3–0	0–1	1–3	4–0
New Taipei FJCU	1–1	0–3	1–0	—	2–4	1–0	7–2
Sunny Bank AC Taipei Reserves	1–0	2–2	0–1	2–0	—	5–0	6–0
Taichung Rock B	2–0	1–3	0–2	5–2	3–3	—	4–1
Wan Island	1–7	0–8	1–3	0–4	1–7	2–7	—

Legend: Blue = home team win; Yellow = draw; Red = away team win.

=== Results by round ===
Team ╲ Round	1	2	3	4	5	6	7	8	9	10	11	12	13	14
Inter Taoyuan	W	D	L	L	X	W	D	L	D	D	L	D	X	W
Kaohsiung Attackers	D	D	W	X	W	W	W	D	W	W	W	L	W	X
MCU Desafio	D	D	W	L	L	X	W	D	D	W	L	X	W	W
New Taipei FJCU	W	W	X	W	L	L	D	W	L	D	X	W	L	L
Sunny Bank AC Taipei Reserves	L	D	L	W	W	D	X	W	L	X	W	W	W	W
Taichung Rock B	X	L	W	W	W	D	L	X	W	L	W	D	L	L
Wan Island	L	X	L	L	L	L	L	L	X	L	L	L	L	L

W = Win; D = Draw; L = Loss; X = No match in this round

== Promotion–relegation playoffs ==
7 June 2026
15:30 (UTC+8)

Taipower	3–0	MCU Desafio
Yang Chen-ying 17'; Lai Wei 45+1'; Yeh Ching-chun 49'	Recap

Kaohsiung Nanzih Football Stadium, Kaohsiung
Referee: Kuo Chan-yu

== Statistics ==
=== Scoring ===
- First goal of the season:
  (Taiwan) Hsu Han (Inter Taoyuan) against Sunny Bank AC Taipei Reserves (13 September 2025)
- Last goal of the season:
  (Eswatini) Thabiso Dlamini (Wan Island) against Inter Taoyuan (9 May 2026)

=== Top goalscorers ===
Rank	Player	Club	Goals
1	(Brazil) Luan Anderson	Kaohsiung Attackers	8
1	(Taiwan) Hsu Liu Chien-feng	Taichung Rock B	8
3	(Japan) Sota Kano	Sunny Bank AC Taipei Reserves	7
3	(Japan) Kotaro Shiba	Kaohsiung Attackers	7
5	(Guatemala) Rodrigo Calderon	Sunny Bank AC Taipei Reserves	5
5	(Taiwan) Chuan Che-wei	New Taipei FJCU	5
5	(Taiwan) Su Ming-chiang	MCU Desafio	5
8	(Taiwan) Chen Chih-wei	Taichung Rock B	4
8	(Brazil) Otavio Neto	Kaohsiung Attackers	4
10	(Taiwan) Chen Kai-di	Inter Taoyuan/New Taipei FJCU	3
10	(Taiwan) Cheng Kai-yi	Taichung Rock B	3
10	(Morocco) Soufiane Khoulal	Kaohsiung Attackers	3
10	(Taiwan) Lee Wei-lun	Taichung Rock B	3
10	(Taiwan) Mu Hsuan-kai	Sunny Bank AC Taipei Reserves	3
10	(Taiwan) Hayato Takayama	Sunny Bank AC Taipei Reserves	3
10	(Japan) Tsubasa Tanaka	MCU Desafio	3

==== Hat-tricks ====
Player	For	Against	Score	Date	Round
(Taiwan) Chuan Che-wei	New Taipei FJCU	Wan Island	7–2 (H)	13 September 2025	1
(Taiwan) Hsu Liu Chien-feng	Taichung Rock B	Wan Island	7–2 (A)	25 October 2025	3
(Japan) Kotaro Shiba	Kaohsiung Attackers	Wan Island	8–0 (A)	22 November 2025	5
(Taiwan) Cheng Kai-yi	Taichung Rock B	New Taipei FJCU	5–2 (H)	21 March 2026	9
(Taiwan) Mu Hsuan-kai	Sunny Bank AC Taipei Reserves	Wan Island	6–0 (H)	25 April 2026	12

==== Own goals ====
Player	For	Against	Date	Round
(Eswatini) Mnisi Mpendulo	Wan Island	New Taipei FJCU	13 September 2025	1
(Taiwan) Wang Hung-yu	Taichung Rock B	New Taipei FJCU	20 September 2025	2
(Taiwan) Lai Po-lun	Inter Taoyuan	Sunny Bank AC Taipei Reserves	7 March 2026	8
(Taiwan) Chang Chun-chieh	Wan Island	Sunny Bank AC Taipei Reserves	25 April 2026	12

=== Clean Sheets ===
Rank	Player	Club	Shutouts
1	(Taiwan) Huang Po-hao	MCU Desafio	4
1	(Taiwan) Yu Sen-chiao	Kaohsiung Attackers	4
3	(Taiwan) Hou Po-yen	Sunny Bank AC Taipei Reserves	3
3	(Taiwan) Lin Yu-hsiang	New Taipei FJCU	3
5	(Taiwan) Hsu Wei-Hsiang	Kaohsiung Attackers	2
5	(Japan) Kenshin Katata	Sunny Bank AC Taipei Reserves	2
5	(Taiwan) Wang Lee-jie	Inter Taoyuan	2
8	(Taiwan) Chen Kuan-chih	Taichung Rock B	1
8	(Taiwan) Chen Sheng-han	MCU Desafio	1
8	(Taiwan) Chien Wei-ming	New Taipei FJCU	1
8	(Taiwan) Lai Po-lun	Inter Taoyuan	1
8	(Guatemala) Gerardo Rabre	Inter Taoyuan	1

== Awards ==
Award	Winner	Club	Ref.
Golden Boot	(Brazil) Luan Anderson	Kaohsiung Attackers	
Golden Glove	(Taiwan) Yu Sen-chiao	Kaohsiung Attackers	

== See also ==
- 2025–26 Taiwan Football Premier League
- 2025–26 Taiwan Mulan Football League
