= 2026–27 Taichung Rock season =

Taichung Rock
2026–27 season
- Chairman: Feng Shih-wen
- Head coach: Martino Sofia
- Main ground: Xitun Football Field
- Top goalscorer: League: Filip Simecek (2); All: Filip Simecek (2)
- Biggest defeat: Kaohsiung Attackers 5–2 Taichung Rock; Taichung Rock 1–4 Tatung Taiwan Leopard Cat
- All statistics correct as of 22 November 2026.

The 2026–27 Taichung Rock season is the club's 3rd season and their 2nd season in Taiwan Football Premier League.

== Kits ==
- Supplier: Athleta
- Main Sponsor: S.Pellegrino

== Management team ==
Position	Name
Head coach	(Italy) Martino Sofia
Assistant coach	(Italy) Thomas Castello
Goalkeeping coach	(Brazil) Juliano Rodrigues
Strength and conditioning coach	(Chinese Taipei) Chiang Yi-fan

- Last updated: 3 September 2026

== Players ==
N	Pos.	Nat.	Name	Age.	Since
Goalkeepers
25	GK	(Serbia)	Igor Zavis	24	2026
70	GK	(Italy)	Andrea Boschi	21	2026
99	GK	(Chinese Taipei)	Lin Chun-hua	24	2026
Defenders
4	DF	(Chinese Taipei)	Tsai Chun-sheng	21	2025
6	DF	(Chinese Taipei)	Sun En-chi	22	2025
12	DF	(Chinese Taipei)	Lee Yu-lin	21	2025
13	DF	(Chinese Taipei)	Chen Po-wei	23	2026
24	DF	(Germany)	Dominik Limprecht	24	2026
66	DF	(Chinese Taipei)	Tseng Yun-hao	24	2025
78	DF	(Italy)	Lorenzo Costa	19	2026
Midfielders
5	MF	(Chinese Taipei)	Chou Yu-chieh (captain)	28	2025
7	MF	(Chinese Taipei)	Kung Chih-yu	20	2025
10	MF	(Czech Republic)	Filip Simecek	24	2026
16	MF	(Chinese Taipei)	Wei Chih-chuan	23	2025
18	MF	(Moldova)	Nichita Josan	19	2026
28	MF	(Chinese Taipei)	Chen Chih-wei	24	2026
29	MF	(Chinese Taipei)	Chiang Chun-yao	25	2026
32	MF	(Chinese Taipei)	Ko Yueh-ting	22	2025
35	MF	(Chinese Taipei)	Lee Hung-chun	22	2025
37	MF	(Chinese Taipei)	Liang Hao-teng	24	2025
45	MF	(Chinese Taipei)	Hu Yu-hsiang	19	2026
Forwards
9	FW	(Chinese Taipei)	Liu Chien-wei	25	2025
11	FW	(Chinese Taipei)	Yang Chao-jing	21	2025
14	FW	(Chinese Taipei)	Lee Wei-lun	24	2026
27	FW	(Chinese Taipei)	Shih Jing-tang	23	2024
44	FW	(Japan)	Sora Yamauchi	26	2025

== Transfers ==
=== In ===
No.	Pos.	Player	Transferred from	Fee	Source
Preseason
10	MF	Filip Simecek	(Czech Republic) Kladno		
11	FW	Yang Chao-jing	(Hong Kong) Kowloon City	Loan return	
13	DF	Chen Po-wei	(Chinese Taipei) Taichung Rock B		
14	FW	Lee Wei-lun	(Chinese Taipei) Taichung Rock B		
18	MF	Nichita Josan	(Italy) Hellas Verona Primavera		
24	DF	Dominik Limprecht	(Germany) Dynamo Schwerin		
25	GK	Igor Zavis	(Serbia) Bačka		
28	MF	Chen Chih-wei	(Chinese Taipei) Taichung Rock B		
29	MF	Chiang Chun-yao	(Chinese Taipei) Taichung Rock B		
45	MF	Hu Yu-hsiang	(Chinese Taipei) Taichung Rock B		
70	GK	Andrea Boschi	(Italy) Vado		
78	DF	Lorenzo Costa	(Italy) Chisola		
99	GK	Lin Chun-hua	(Chinese Taipei) Taichung Futuro		

=== Out ===
No.	Pos.	Player	Transferred to	Source
Preseason
1	GK	Huang Huai-hsien	(Chinese Taipei) Taichung San Hai Tun NTUS	
2	FW	Cheng Kai-yi	(Chinese Taipei) Taichung San Hai Tun NTUS	
10	MF	Chang Heng	(Chinese Taipei) Taichung Futuro	
19	MF	Chou Yu-hao	(Chinese Taipei) Taichung San Hai Tun NTUS	
21	FW	Ku Chieh-an	(Chinese Taipei) Taichung San Hai Tun NTUS	
30	GK	Chen Hsuan-ting	(Chinese Taipei) Taichung San Hai Tun NTUS	
47	MF	Kao Kuan-yu	(Chinese Taipei) Taichung San Hai Tun NTUS	
88	DF	Liao Yi-sheng	–	
99	GK	Tsai Yu-hsiang	(Chinese Taipei) Kaohsiung Attackers	
Midseason
48	DF	Wang Yi-you	–	
77	FW	Lin Wei-chieh	–	

== Preseason and friendlies ==
27 August 2026 Taichung Community Shield	Taichung Rock	2–0	Taichung Futuro	Taichung
18:00 (UTC+8)				Stadium: Xitun Football Field

== Competitions ==
=== Overall record ===
Competition	First match	Last match	Starting round	Final position	Record							
Competition	First match	Last match	Starting round	Final position	Pld	W	D	L	GF	GA	GD	Win %
TFPL	13 September 2026	2 May 2027	Matchday 1	-	6	0	0	6	5	18	−13	0.00
Total					6	0	0	6	5	18	−13	0.00

=== Taiwan Football Premier League ===
==== League table ====
Pos	Team	Pld	W	D	L	GF	GA	GD	Pts	Qualification or relegation
1	Kaohsiung Attackers	6	4	2	0	14	5	+9	14	Qualification for the AFC Challenge League preliminary stage
2	Tatung Taiwan Leopard Cat	7	2	5	0	10	6	+4	11	
3	New Taipei Hang Yuan	5	2	3	0	6	2	+4	9	
4	Sunny Bank AC Taipei	6	2	2	2	7	6	+1	8	
5	Tainan City TSG	5	2	2	1	6	4	+2	8	
6	Taichung Futuro	7	2	1	4	4	9	−5	7	
7	Taipower	6	2	1	3	8	10	−2	7	
8	Taichung Rock	6	0	0	6	5	18	−13	0	

Updated to match(es) played on 22 November 2026. Source:
Rules for classification: 1) Points; 2) Head-to-head points; 3) Head-to-head goal difference; 4) Head-to-head goals scored; 5) Overall goal difference; 6) Overall goals scored; 7) Fewer disciplinary points; 8) Draw lots

==== Results by round ====
Round	1	2	3	4	5	6	7	8	9	10	11	12	13	14	15	16	17	18	19	20	21
Result	L	L	L		L	L	L														
Position	8	8	8	8	8	8	8														

W = Win; D = Draw; L = Loss

==== Matches ====
13 September 2026 1	Kaohsiung Attackers	5–2	Taichung Rock	Kaohsiung
19:00 (UTC+8)	Benchy 13', 33'; Hung Tzu-kuei (yellow card) 29'; Hama 47'; Tateiwa 60', 85'; Ruiz (yellow card) 84'	Report	Simecek 2'; Yamauchi 17'; Limprecht (yellow card) 45+1'; Chou Yu-chieh (yellow card) 90+5'	Stadium: Kaohsiung Nanzih Football Stadium; Referee: Kuo Chan-yu

20 September 2026 2	Taichung Rock	1–3	Taipower	Taichung
16:30 (UTC+8)	Josan (yellow card) 46' (yellow-red card) 90'; Costa 49' (yellow card) 62'	Report	Lai Wei 6'; Chao Ming-hsiu (yellow card) 13'; Chen Chao-an 39'; Yang Tsung-yi (yellow card) 44'; Chiu Po-jui 65'; Huang Chiu-lin (yellow card) 90'; Lee Chien-liang (yellow card) 90'; Hung Yung-chun (yellow card) 90+2'	Stadium: Xitun Football Field; Referee: Yang Chang-pei

11 October 2026 3	Sunny Bank AC Taipei	2–1	Taichung Rock	New Taipei
16:00 (UTC+8)	Martin Chen (yellow card) 56'; Godoy 62'; Huang Wei-chieh 90+4'	Report	Limprecht (yellow card) 53'; Yang Chao-jing 69'	Stadium: Xizhi Sports Field; Referee: Yu Ming-hsun

25 October 2026 5	Taichung Rock	0–2	Taichung Futuro	Taichung
19:00 (UTC+8)	Lee Yu-lin (red card) 64'	Report	Lee Han-hee 6', 41'	Stadium: Xitun Football Field; Referee: Ko Chuan-yao

1 November 2026 6	New Taipei Hang Yuan	2–0	Taichung Rock	New Taipei
19:00 (UTC+8)	Lin Hai-cheng (yellow card) 18'; Koreeda (yellow card) 44'; Huang Yung-chun 45+2'; Chen Pao-chun 77'	Report	Chou Yu-chieh (yellow card) 45'; Chen Chih-wei (yellow card) 50'; Shih Jing-tang (yellow card) 73'; Simecek (yellow card) 75'	Stadium: Fu Jen Catholic University; Referee: Lin Te-en

22 November 2026 7	Taichung Rock	1–4	Tatung Taiwan Leopard Cat	Taoyuan
15:30 (UTC+8)	Simecek 83'		Chen Jui-chieh 6'; Yao Ko-chi 28', 36'; Lin Chun-kai 55'	Stadium: National Taiwan Sport University; Referee: Chang Chih-chuan

25 November 2026 4	Tainan City TSG	v	Taichung Rock	Tainan
18:30 (UTC+8)				Stadium: Tainan Municipal Football Field

29 November 2026 8	Taichung Rock	v	Kaohsiung Attackers	Taichung
19:00 (UTC+8)				Stadium: Xitun Football Field

6 December 2026 9	Taipower	v	Taichung Rock	Kaohsiung
15:30 (UTC+8)				Stadium: Kaohsiung Nanzih Football Stadium

13 December 2026 10	Taichung Rock	v	Sunny Bank AC Taipei	Taichung
19:00 (UTC+8)				Stadium: Xitun Football Field

24 January 2027 11	Taichung Rock	v	Tainan City TSG	Taichung
16:00 (UTC+8)				Stadium: Xitun Football Field

31 January 2027 12	Taichung Futuro	v	Taichung Rock	Taichung
19:00 (UTC+8)				Stadium: Xitun Football Field

21 February 2027 13	Taichung Rock	v	New Taipei Hang Yuan	Taichung
19:00 (UTC+8)				Stadium: Xitun Football Field

28 February 2027 14	Taiwan Leopard Cat	v	Taichung Rock	New Taipei
16:00 (UTC+8)				Stadium: Fu Jen Catholic University

7 March 2027 15	Kaohsiung Attackers	v	Taichung Rock	Kaohsiung
19:00 (UTC+8)				Stadium: Kaohsiung Nanzih Football Stadium

14 March 2027 16	Taichung Rock	v	Taipower	Taichung
16:00 (UTC+8)				Stadium: Xitun Football Field

21 March 2027 17	Sunny Bank AC Taipei	v	Taichung Rock	New Taipei
15:00 (UTC+8)				Stadium: Xizhi Sports Field

11 April 2027 18	Tainan City TSG	v	Taichung Rock	Tainan
18:30 (UTC+8)				Stadium: Tainan Municipal Football Field

18 April 2027 19	Taichung Rock	v	Taichung Futuro	Taichung
19:00 (UTC+8)				Stadium: Xitun Football Field

25 April 2027 20	New Taipei Hang Yuan	v	Taichung Rock	Taipei
15:30 (UTC+8)				Stadium: Taipei Municipal Stadium

2 May 2027 21	Taichung Rock	v	Taiwan Leopard Cat	Taichung
16:30 (UTC+8)				Stadium: Xitun Football Field

== Statistics ==
=== Squad statistics ===
No.	Pos	Nat	Player	Total		TFPL	
No.	Pos	Nat	Player	Apps	Goals	Apps	Goals
Goalkeepers
25	GK	(Serbia) SRB	Igor Zavis	2	0	2	0
70	GK	(Italy) ITA	Andrea Boschi	4	0	4	0
99	GK	(Chinese Taipei) TPE	Lin Chun-hua	0	0	0	0
Defenders
4	DF	(Chinese Taipei) TPE	Tsai Chun-sheng	3	0	1+2	0
6	DF	(Chinese Taipei) TPE	Sun En-chi	5	0	4+1	0
12	DF	(Chinese Taipei) TPE	Lee Yu-lin	5	0	4+1	0
13	DF	(Chinese Taipei) TPE	Chen Po-wei	0	0	0	0
24	DF	(Germany) GER	Dominik Limprecht	6	0	5+1	0
66	DF	(Chinese Taipei) TPE	Tseng Yun-hao	5	0	4+1	0
78	DF	(Italy) ITA	Lorenzo Costa	2	1	2	1
Midfielders
5	MF	(Chinese Taipei) TPE	Chou Yu-chieh	6	0	2+4	0
7	MF	(Chinese Taipei) TPE	Kung Chih-yu	5	0	4+1	0
10	MF	(Czech Republic) CZE	Filip Simecek	6	2	6	2
16	MF	(Chinese Taipei) TPE	Wei Chih-chuan	2	0	0+2	0
18	MF	(Moldova) MDA	Nichita Josan	4	0	1+3	0
28	MF	(Chinese Taipei) TPE	Chen Chih-wei	4	0	2+2	0
29	MF	(Chinese Taipei) TPE	Chiang Chun-yao	2	0	2	0
32	MF	(Chinese Taipei) TPE	Ko Yueh-ting	5	0	4+1	0
35	MF	(Chinese Taipei) TPE	Lee Hung-chun	5	0	4+1	0
37	MF	(Chinese Taipei) TPE	Liang Hao-teng	0	0	0	0
45	MF	(Chinese Taipei) TPE	Hu Yu-hsiang	1	0	0+1	0
Forwards
9	FW	(Chinese Taipei) TPE	Liu Chien-wei	2	0	2	0
11	FW	(Chinese Taipei) TPE	Yang Chao-jing	4	1	3+1	1
14	FW	(Chinese Taipei) TPE	Lee Wei-lun	4	0	2+2	0
27	FW	(Chinese Taipei) TPE	Shih Jing-tang	3	0	2+1	0
44	FW	(Japan) JPN	Sora Yamauchi	6	1	5+1	1
Players who left during the season but made an appearance
48	DF	(Chinese Taipei) TPE	Wang Yi-you	1	0	1	0
Own goals (0)

=== Goalscorers ===
Rank	No.	Pos.	Nat.	Player	TMFL	Total
1	10	MF	(Czech Republic)	Filip Simecek	2	2
2	11	FW	(Chinese Taipei)	Yang Chao-jing	1	1
2	44	FW	(Japan)	Sora Yamauchi	1	1
2	78	DF	(Italy)	Lorenzo Costa	1	1
Totals					5	5

=== Cleansheets ===
Rank	No.	Nat.	Player	TMFL	Total
1	25	(Serbia)	Igor Zavis	0	0
1	70	(Italy)	Andrea Boschi	0	0
1	99	(Chinese Taipei)	Lin Chun-hua	—	0
Totals				0	0

=== Disciplinary record ===
No.	Pos.	Nat.	Name	TFPL			Total		
No.	Pos.	Nat.	Name	Yellow card	(yellow card) (yellow-red card)	Red card	Yellow card	(yellow card) (yellow-red card)	Red card
12	DF	(Chinese Taipei)	Lee Yu-lin			1			1
18	MF	(Moldova)	Nichita Josan		1			1	
5	MF	(Chinese Taipei)	Chou Yu-chieh	2			2		
24	DF	(Germany)	Dominik Limprecht	2			2		
10	MF	(Chinese Taipei)	Filip Simecek	1			1		
27	FW	(Chinese Taipei)	Shih Jing-tang	1			1		
28	MF	(Chinese Taipei)	Chen Chih-wei	1			1		
78	DF	(Italy)	Lorenzo Costa	1			1		
Trainer		(Brazil)	Juliano Rodrigues	1			1		
Totals				9	1	1	9	1	1

Ordered by (red card) , (second yellow card) and (yellow card)
(yellow card) = Number of bookings; (second yellow card) = Number of sending offs after a second yellow card; (red card) = Number of sending offs by a direct red card.
