= 2024 Taiwan Football League Division 2 =

Taiwan Football League Division 2
- Season: 2024
- Dates: 24 August 2024 – 7 December 2024
- Matches: 3
- Goals: 9 (3 per match)
- Top goalscorer: Yang Chao-jing (4 goals)
- Biggest home win: Inter Taoyuan 1–0 MCU Desafio (24 August 2024)
- Biggest away win: Taipei Elite 1–6 Taichung Rock (24 August 2024)
- Highest scoring: Taipei Elite 1–6 Taichung Rock (24 August 2024)
- Longest winning run: Inter Taoyuan; NUK Kuo Kuang; Taichung Rock (1 match)
- Longest unbeaten run: Inter Taoyuan; NUK Kuo Kuang; Taichung Rock (1 match)
- Longest winless run: MCU Desafio; Sunny Bank AC Taipei Reserves; Taipei Elite (1 match)
- Longest losing run: MCU Desafio; Sunny Bank AC Taipei Reserves; Taipei Elite (1 match)
- All statistics correct as of 29 August 2024.

The 2024 Taiwan Football League Division 2 is the fifth season of Taiwan Football League Division 2. The season began on 24 August 2024 and scheduled to end on 7 December 2024.

== Teams ==
=== Promotions and relegations ===
There are 6 teams in the league, including 3 teams from the 2023 season, 1 team relegated from the TFPL, 1 team from the qualifier and 1 team via receiving the playing spot transference.

==== Incoming teams ====
Taipei Dragons finished last place in the 2023 Taiwan Football Premier League and was relegated automatically. Taipei Dragons was renamed to Taipei Elite for the 2024 season. MCU Desafio, a combined team of Ming Chuan University and Desafio, qualified from the 2024 qualifiers. Taichung Rock had received a playing spot from Land Home NTUS.

==== Outgoing teams ====
Vikings–PlayOne, the champions of the second division in 2023 earned automatic promotion to the Taiwan Football Premier League. Vikings–PlayOne was renamed to Taipei Vikings for the 2024 season. Saturday Football International, finishing 6th in 2023 season didn't sign up for this season. Land Home NTUS had transferred their playing spot to Sports Agglomerate Company Limited, who had later created Taichung Rock.

Incoming teams	Outgoing teams
MCU Desafio; Taichung Rock; Taipei Elite	Land Home NTUS; Saturday Football International; Vikings–PlayOne

=== Teams and locations ===
Team	Chinese	Based in	Seasons in Division 2	First season in Division 2
Inter Taoyuan	桃園國際	Taoyuan City	5	2020
MCU Desafio	銘傳Desafio	Taipei City	1	2024
NUK Kuo Kuang	高大國光	Kaohsiung City	2	2023
Sunny Bank AC Taipei Reserves	陽信北競預備隊	Taipei City	2	2023
Taichung Rock	台中磐石	Taichung City	1	2024
Taipei Elite	臺北菁英	Taipei City	2	2022

=== Venues ===
Taiwan Football League Division 2 teams currently don't have their own home grounds. Matches were mainly played in Yingfeng Riverside Park.

Location of venues in 2024 Taiwan Football League Division 2

Stadium	Chinese	Location	Capacity
Ming Chuan University Taoyuan Campus	銘傳大學龜山校區	Taoyuan City	5,000
National University of Kaohsiung	國立高雄大學	Kaohsiung City	0
Xitun Football Field	西屯足球場	Taichung City	0
Yingfeng Riverside Park	迎風河濱公園	Taipei City	100

=== Personnel and sponsorship ===
Team	Manager	Captain	Kit manufacturer	Main kit sponsor
Inter Taoyuan	(Taiwan) Lin Hsin-yu	(Chinese Taipei) Hsu Hung-chih	Kappa	Taoyuan City Government
MCU Desafio	(Taiwan) Liu Cheng-he	(Japan) Yutaro Takagi	Athleta	ASRock
NUK Kuo Kuang	(Taiwan) Chen Chien-chih	(Chinese Taipei) Huang Chao-chung	Kicker	CPC Corporation
Sunny Bank AC Taipei Reserves	(Spain) Abel Lorenzo	(Chinese Taipei) Tsai Meng-tzu	Ucan	Sunny Bank
Taichung Rock	(Taiwan) Lin Chi-fu	(Chinese Taipei) Yang Chao-jing		Subkarma
Taipei Elite	(Jamaica) Oliver Harley		Kelme	—N/a

== League table ==
Pos	Team	Pld	W	D	L	GF	GA	GD	Pts	Qualification or relegation
1	Taichung Rock (C, P)	10	7	1	2	32	10	+22	22	Promoted to the 2025–26 Taiwan Football Premier League
2	NUK Kuo Kuang	10	6	3	1	18	7	+11	21	
3	Inter Taoyuan	10	5	2	3	17	11	+6	17	Qualified to the 2025–26 TFPL promotion/relegation playoffs
4	MCU Desafio	10	3	1	6	10	24	−14	10	
5	Taipei Elite	10	2	2	6	22	36	−14	8	
6	Sunny Bank AC Taipei Reserves	10	2	1	7	11	22	−11	7	

(C) Champions; (P) Promoted

== Results ==
=== Qualifiers ===
Pos	Team	Pld	W	D	L	GF	GA	GD	Pts	Qualification or relegation
1	NUK Kuo Kuang (Q)	3	3	0	0	15	0	+15	9	Qualified for the 2024 Taiwan Football League Division 2
2	MCU Desafio (Q)	3	2	0	1	6	6	0	6	Qualified for the 2024 Taiwan Football League Division 2
3	Racing Vikings (E)	3	1	0	2	3	11	−8	3	Eliminated from Taiwan Football League Division 2
4	Tainan Dong Men Cheng (E)	3	0	0	3	3	10	−7	0	Eliminated from Taiwan Football League Division 2

(E) Eliminated; (Q) Qualified

22 June 2024 1	Tainan Dong Men Cheng	2–3	MCU Desafio	Kaohsiung
13:30 (UTC+8)	Tseng Chung-chih (yellow card) 6'; Neto (yellow card) 50'; Hsu En-hao (yellow card) 87'		Huang Yi-cheng (yellow card) 51'; Yu You-yi (yellow card) 81'	Stadium: National University of Kaohsiung

22 June 2024 2	NUK Kuo Kuang	7–0	Racing Vikings	Kaohsiung
15:30 (UTC+8)				Stadium: National University of Kaohsiung

23 June 2024 3	MCU Desafio	0–3	NUK Kuo Kuang	Kaohsiung
13:30 (UTC+8)	Huang Yi-cheng (yellow card) 65'			Stadium: National University of Kaohsiung

23 June 2024 4	Racing Vikings	2–1	Tainan Dong Men Cheng	Kaohsiung
15:30 (UTC+8)			Wang Hsiang-hsi (yellow card) 71'; Chen Sung-nan (yellow card) 90+6'	Stadium: National University of Kaohsiung

24 June 2024 5	Tainan Dong Men Cheng	0–5	NUK Kuo Kuang	Kaohsiung
13:30 (UTC+8)	Lin Kuan-heng (yellow card) 45+3'		Yeh Yu-hung (yellow card) 48'	Stadium: National University of Kaohsiung

24 June 2024 6	Racing Vikings	1–3	MCU Desafio	Kaohsiung
15:30 (UTC+8)	Tan Hao-chung (yellow card) 13'; Liu Chao-teng (yellow card) 75'		Cheng Yu-che (yellow card) 61'; Cheng Kai-wei (yellow card) 72'	Stadium: National University of Kaohsiung

=== Regular season ===
Home \ Away	INT	MCU	NUK	SAC	TCR	TPE
Inter Taoyuan	—	1–0	Sep 21	Nov 23	1–2	Nov 16
MCU Desafio	Nov 9	—	Nov 16	Sep 15	Dec 7	Sep 28
NUK Kuo Kuang	Dec 7	Oct 5	—	Nov 9	Nov 23	Sep 14
Sunny Bank AC Taipei Reserves	Sep 28	0–1	0–1	—	Oct 5	Dec 7
Taichung Rock	Sep 14	Sep 21	Sep 28	Nov 16	—	Nov 9
Taipei Elite	Oct 5	Nov 23	2–2	Sep 21	1–6	—

Updated to match(es) played on 24 August 2024. Source:
Legend: Blue = home team win; Yellow = draw; Red = away team win.

== Promotion–relegation playoffs ==
Ming Chuan University, finishing 7th in 2024 TFPL season, was required to play in the promotion–relegation playoffs. NUK Kuo Kuang finished 2nd in 2024 League 2 and was expected to play in the playoffs. However, Inter Taoyuan, finishing 3rd in 2024 League 2 took over the opportunity due to the NUK Kuo Kuang didn't apply for the CTFA club licensing, which is required for playing in the Taiwan Football Premier League.

18 December 2024
19:00 (UTC+8)

Ming Chuan University	2–1 (a.e.t.)	Inter Taoyuan
Ng Pui-hei 9'; Wang Hsuan 105+1'	Recap	Chen Ching-hsuan 72'

Ming Chuan University, Taoyuan
Referee: Chen Hsin-chuan

== Statistics ==
=== Scoring ===
- First goal of the season:
  (Taiwan) Lee Chun-chi for NUK Kuo Kuang against Sunny Bank AC Taipei Reserves (24 August 2024)

=== Top goalscorers ===
Rank	Player	Club	Goals
1	(Taiwan) Yang Chao-jing	Taichung Rock	4
2	(Guatemala) Gerardo Rabre	Inter Taoyuan	1
2	(Taiwan) Lee Hung-chun	Taichung Rock	1
2	(Taiwan) Lee Chun-chi	NUK Kuo Kuang	1
2	(Guatemala) Rodrigo Calderon	Taipei Elite	1

==== Hat-tricks ====
Player	For	Against	Score	Date	Round
(Taiwan) Yang Chao-jing^{4}	Taichung Rock	Taipei Elite	1–6 (A)	24 August 2024	1

^{4} – Player scored four goals.

== See also ==
- 2024 Taiwan Football Premier League
- 2024 Taiwan Mulan Football League
