= 2026–27 Taiwan Football Premier League =

Taiwan Football Premier League
- Season: 2026–27
- Dates: 13 September 2026 – 2 May 2027
- Matches: 24
- Goals: 60 (2.5 per match)
- Top goalscorer: Rintaro Hama (5 goals)
- Biggest home win: Kaohsiung Attackers 5–2 Taichung Rock (13 September 2026); Kaohsiung Attackers 3–0 Taipower (1 November 2026); Tainan City TSG 3–0 Taichung Futuro (1 November 2026)
- Biggest away win: Taichung Rock 1–4 Tatung Taiwan Leopard Cat (22 November 2026)
- Highest scoring: Kaohsiung Attackers 5–2 Taichung Rock (13 September 2026)
- Longest winning run: Kaohsiung Attackers; New Taipei Hang Yuan; Sunny Bank AC Taipei; Tainan City TSG; Taipower (2 matches)
- Longest unbeaten run: Tatung Taiwan Leopard Cat (7 matches)
- Longest winless run: Taichung Rock (6 matches)
- Longest losing run: Taichung Rock (6 matches)
- All statistics correct as of 22 November 2026.

The 2026–27 Taiwan Football Premier League is the 10th season of Taiwan Football Premier League, the top-flight association football competition in Taiwan under its current format. The season begins on 13 September 2026 and ends on 2 May 2027.

There will be no relegations for this season due to the upcoming league expansion for the 2027–28 season.

== Teams ==
=== Promotions and relegations ===
There are 8 teams in the league, including 7 teams from the 2025–26 season and 1 team promoted from the 2025–26 League 2.

==== Teams relegated to League 2 ====
Ming Chuan University was the only team relegated after finishing last place in the previous season, ending their 4 year stay in the top tier.

==== Teams promoted from League 2 ====
Kaohsiung Attackers, the champions of League 2 in 2025–26 earned automatic promotion and was the only team promoted after MCU Desafio had lost 0–3 to Taipower in the promotion/relegation playoffs.

| Promoted from 2025–26 League 2 | Relegated from 2025–26 TFPL |
|---|---|
| Kaohsiung Attackers | Ming Chuan University |

=== Teams and locations ===
| Team | Chinese | Based in | Seasons in TFPL | First season in TFPL |
|---|---|---|---|---|
| Kaohsiung Attackers | 高雄先鋒 | Kaohsiung City | 1 | 2026–27 |
| New Taipei Hang Yuan | 新北航源 | New Taipei City | 10 | 2017 |
| Sunny Bank AC Taipei | 陽信北競 | Taipei City | 5 | 2022 |
| Taichung Futuro | 台中Futuro | Taichung City | 8 | 2019 |
| Taichung Rock | 台中磐石 | Taichung City | 2 | 2025–26 |
| Tainan City TSG | 南市台鋼 | Tainan City | 10 | 2017 |
| Taipower | 台灣電力 | Kaohsiung City | 10 | 2017 |
| Tatung Taiwan Leopard Cat | 大同臺灣石虎 | Taipei City | 10 | 2017 |

=== Venues ===
Taiwan Football Premier League teams currently don't play all their home games in a specific home ground. Some venues may hold up to two different matches in a single matchday.

Location of venues in 2026–27 Taiwan Football Premier League

| Stadium | Chinese | Location | Capacity |
|---|---|---|---|
| Fu Jen Catholic University Stadium | 輔仁大學足球場 | New Taipei City | 3,000 |
| Kaohsiung Nanzih Football Stadium | 高雄市立楠梓足球場 | Kaohsiung City | 1,200 |
| National Taiwan Sport University Athletic Field | 國立體育大學田徑場 | Taoyuan City | 3,000 |
| Taichung Football Sports and Leisure Park Training Pitch | 南屯人工草皮練習場 | Taichung City | 0 |
| Tainan Municipal Football Field | 臺南市立足球場 | Tainan City | 2,000 |
| Taipei Municipal Stadium | 臺北田徑場 | Taipei City | 20,000 |
| Taiyuan Football Field | 太原足球場 | Taichung City | 600 |
| Xitun Football Field | 西屯足球場 | Taichung City | 200 |
| Xizhi Sports Field | 汐止綜合運動場 | New Taipei City | 466 |

=== Foreign players ===
- Players name in **bold** indicates the player was registered during the mid-season transfer window.

| Club | Player 1 | Player 2 | Player 3 | Player 4 | Player 5 | Player 6 | Player 7 | Player 8 | Player 9 | Former player (s) |
|---|---|---|---|---|---|---|---|---|---|---|
| Kaohsiung Attackers | (Brazil) Luan Anderson | (Philippines) Junell Bautista | (Japan) Rintaro Hama | (South Korea) Kwon Seung-seong | (Brazil) Otavio Neto | (Guatemala) Andy Ruiz | (Japan) Kotaro Shiba | (Japan) Genki Tateiwa | (Russia) Alim Zumakulov | |
| New Taipei Hang Yuan | (Honduras) Elías Argueta | (Japan) Naoki Kaneko | (Japan) Shingo Koreeda | (South Korea) Lee Tae-bin | (Japan) Nagisa Sakurauchi | (Japan) Kentaro Sato | | | | |
| Sunny Bank AC Taipei | (Guatemala) Rodrigo Calderon | (Chile) Matias Godoy | (Japan) Sota Kano | (Japan) Kenshin Katata | (Japan) Yamato Kumagai | (Japan) Tsuyoshi Kusuyama | (Japan) Jun Uchida | | | |
| Taichung Futuro | (United States) Edison Castro | (South Korea) Lee Han-hee | (Japan) Kenya Matsui | (Japan) Ren Nishimura | (Japan) Keisuke Ogawa | (Japan) Ryota Saito | (Japan) Oki Sakimoto | (Japan) Kaoru Takayama | | |
| Taichung Rock | (Italy) Andrea Boschi | (Italy) Lorenzo Costa | (Moldova) Nichita Josan | (Germany) Dominik Limprecht | (Czech Republic) Filip Simecek | (Japan) Sora Yamauchi | (Serbia) Igor Zavis | | | |
| Tainan City TSG | (South Korea) Kim Sang-jun | (South Korea) Kim Sung-kyum | (South Korea) Kim Young-geun | (South Korea) Lim Sang-woo | (Colombia) Kevin Moreno | (South Korea) Oh Se-sim | (Ghana) Isreal Opoku | (Brazil) Matheus Porto | (Brazil) Wilker | |
| Taipower | | | | | | | | | | |
| Tatung Taiwan Leopard Cat | (Japan) Yunosuke Fukasawa | (Japan) Taiyo Izumi | (Japan) Jun Kochi | (Kenya) Nichodemus Malika | (Japan) Naoyuki Yamazaki | (Burkina Faso) Gaël Zabramba | | | | |

=== Personnel and sponsorship ===
| Team | Manager | Captain | Kit manufacturer | Main kit sponsor |
|---|---|---|---|---|
| Kaohsiung Attackers | (Spain) Yago | (Russia) Alim Zumakulov | (Japan) Athleta | Matrix Fitness |
| New Taipei Hang Yuan | (Taiwan) Hung Chin-hwai | (Chinese Taipei) Huang Yung-chun | (Taiwan) Entes | —N/a |
| Sunny Bank AC Taipei | (Spain) Abel Lorenzo | (Chinese Taipei) Tsai Meng-chen | (China) Ucan | Sunny Bank |
| Taichung Futuro | (Taiwan) Fang Ching-ren | (Chinese Taipei) Chen Ting-yang | (Spain) Joma | Taichung City Government |
| Taichung Rock | (Italy) Martino Sofia | (Chinese Taipei) Chou Yu-hao | (Japan) Athleta | S.Pellegrino |
| Tainan City TSG | (Portugal) João Prates | (Chinese Taipei) Wu Chun-ching | (Spain) Kelme | Taiwan Steel Group |
| Taipower | (Taiwan) Chen Chieh-jen | (Chinese Taipei) Huang Chiu-lin | (Taiwan) Tor Star | —N/a |
| Tatung Taiwan Leopard Cat | (Taiwan) Lo Chih-an | (Chinese Taipei) Yu Chia-huang | (Taiwan) Taiwolf | Tatung |

=== Managerial changes ===
| Team | Outgoing manager | Manner of departure | Date of vacancy | Position in table | Incoming manager | Date of appointment |
|---|---|---|---|---|---|---|
| Kaohsiung Attackers | (Taiwan) Weng Wei-pin | End of contract | 9 May 2026 | Pre-season | (Spain) Yago | 11 May 2026 |
| Taichung Rock | (Japan) Yoshiharu Ezoe | End of contract | 30 May 2026 | Pre-season | (Italy) Martino Sofia | 30 June 2026 |
| Tatung Taiwan Leopard Cat | (Taiwan) Liu Cheng-ho | End of contract | 2 June 2026 | Pre-season | (Taiwan) Lo Chih-an | 1 July 2026 |
| Tainan City TSG | (Spain) Carlos Garcia | End of contract | 27 June 2026 | Pre-season | (Portugal) João Prates | 14 July 2026 |

== League table ==
| Pos | Team | Pld | W | D | L | GF | GA | GD | Pts | Qualification or relegation |
|---|---|---|---|---|---|---|---|---|---|---|
| 1 | Kaohsiung Attackers | 6 | 4 | 2 | 0 | 14 | 5 | +9 | 14 | Qualification for the AFC Challenge League preliminary stage |
| 2 | Tatung Taiwan Leopard Cat | 7 | 2 | 5 | 0 | 10 | 6 | +4 | 11 | |
| 3 | New Taipei Hang Yuan | 5 | 2 | 3 | 0 | 6 | 2 | +4 | 9 | |
| 4 | Sunny Bank AC Taipei | 6 | 2 | 2 | 2 | 7 | 6 | +1 | 8 (Note: Ranked on head-to-head points: Sunny Bank AC Taipei 3, Tainan City TSG 0) | |
| 5 | Tainan City TSG | 5 | 2 | 2 | 1 | 6 | 4 | +2 | 8 | |
| 6 | Taichung Futuro | 7 | 2 | 1 | 4 | 4 | 9 | −5 | 7 (Note: Ranked on head-to-head points: Taichung Futuro 3, Taipower 0) | |
| 7 | Taipower | 6 | 2 | 1 | 3 | 8 | 10 | −2 | 7 | |
| 8 | Taichung Rock | 6 | 0 | 0 | 6 | 5 | 18 | −13 | 0 | |

Updated to match(es) played on 22 November 2026. Source:
Rules for classification: 1) Points; 2) Head-to-head points; 3) Head-to-head goal difference; 4) Head-to-head goals scored; 5) Overall goal difference; 6) Overall goals scored; 7) Fewer disciplinary points; 8) Draw lots

=== Position by round ===
| Team ╲ Round | 1 | 2 | 3 | 4 | 5 | 6 | 7 | 8 | 9 | 10 | 11 | 12 | 13 | 14 | 15 | 16 | 17 | 18 | 19 | 20 | 21 |
|---|---|---|---|---|---|---|---|---|---|---|---|---|---|---|---|---|---|---|---|---|---|
| Kaohsiung Attackers | 1 | 1 | 1 | 1 | 1 | 1 | 1 | | | | | | | | | | | | | | |
| New Taipei Hang Yuan | 5 | 5 | 5 | 6 | 6 | 6 | 3 | | | | | | | | | | | | | | |
| Sunny Bank AC Taipei | 7 | 4 | 3 | 2 | 5 | 2 | 4 | | | | | | | | | | | | | | |
| Taichung Futuro | 6 | 7 | 6 | 5 | 3 | 4 | 6 | | | | | | | | | | | | | | |
| Taichung Rock | 8 | 8 | 8 | 8 | 8 | 8 | 8 | | | | | | | | | | | | | | |
| Tainan City TSG | 4 | 6 | 7 | 7 | 7 | 7 | 5 | | | | | | | | | | | | | | |
| Taipower | 2 | 2 | 2 | 3 | 4 | 5 | 7 | | | | | | | | | | | | | | |
| Tatung Taiwan Leopard Cat | 3 | 3 | 4 | 4 | 2 | 3 | 2 | | | | | | | | | | | | | | |

Updated to match(es) played on 22 November 2026. Source:
= Champions and qualification for the AFC Challenge League preliminary stage

== Results ==
=== Regular season ===
Each team plays a total of 21 games, playing the other teams three times.

| Home \ Away | KHA | NTH | SAC | TCF | TCR | TSG | TPW | TLC | KHA | NTH | SAC | TCF | TCR | TSG | TPW | TLC | KHA | NTH | SAC | TCF | TCR | TSG | TPW | TLC |
|---|---|---|---|---|---|---|---|---|---|---|---|---|---|---|---|---|---|---|---|---|---|---|---|---|
| Kaohsiung Attackers | | 1–1 | 2–1 | 6 Dec | 5–2 | 9 Dec | 3–0 | 24 Jan | | 21 Mar | — | — | 7 Mar | 18 Apr | 25 Apr | — | | — | — | — | — | — | — | — |
| New Taipei Hang Yuan | 13 Dec | | 31 Jan | 28 Feb | 2–0 | 1–1 | 9 Dec | 0–0 | — | | — | — | 25 Apr | 7 Mar | 11 Apr | 6 Dec | — | | — | — | — | — | — | 14 Mar |
| Sunny Bank AC Taipei | 28 Feb | 26 Nov | | 11 Apr | 2–1 | 14 Mar | 29 Nov | 21 Feb | 2 May | 18 Apr | | — | 21 Mar | — | — | — | — | — | | — | — | — | — | — |
| Taichung Futuro | 0–2 | 0–2 | 1–1 | | 31 Jan | 21 Feb | 13 Dec | 0–1 | 14 Mar | 2 May | 24 Jan | | — | — | — | 29 Nov | — | — | — | | — | — | — | — |
| Taichung Rock | 29 Nov | 21 Feb | 13 Dec | 0–2 | | 24 Jan | 1–3 | 1–4 | — | — | — | 18 Apr | | — | 14 Mar | 2 May | — | — | — | — | | — | — | — |
| Tainan City TSG | 31 Jan | 29 Nov | 0–2 | 3–0 | 25 Nov | | 28 Feb | 13 Dec | — | — | 6 Dec | 25 Apr | 11 Apr | | — | — | — | — | — | — | — | | — | — |
| Taipower | 21 Feb | 24 Jan | 1–0 | 0–1 | 6 Dec | 1–2 | | 3–3 | — | — | 7 Mar | 21 Mar | — | 2 May | | — | — | — | — | — | — | — | | — |
| Tatung Taiwan Leopard Cat | 1–1 | — | 1–1 | 7 Mar | 28 Feb | 0–0 | 31 Jan | | 11 Apr | — | 25 Apr | — | — | 21 Mar | 18 Apr | | — | — | — | — | — | — | — | |

Updated to match(es) played on 22 November 2026. Source: TFPL
Legend: Blue = home team win; Yellow = draw; Red = away team win.

=== Results by round ===
| Team ╲ Round | 1 | 2 | 3 | 4 | 5 | 6 | 7 | 8 | 9 | 10 | 11 | 12 | 13 | 14 | 15 | 16 | 17 | 18 | 19 | 20 | 21 |
|---|---|---|---|---|---|---|---|---|---|---|---|---|---|---|---|---|---|---|---|---|---|
| Kaohsiung Attackers | W | W | D | D | | W | W | | | | | | | | | | | | | | |
| New Taipei Hang Yuan | D | D | D | | | W | W | | | | | | | | | | | | | | |
| Sunny Bank AC Taipei | L | W | W | D | | D | L | | | | | | | | | | | | | | |
| Taichung Futuro | L | L | W | D | W | L | L | | | | | | | | | | | | | | |
| Taichung Rock | L | L | L | | L | L | L | | | | | | | | | | | | | | |
| Tainan City TSG | D | L | D | | | W | W | | | | | | | | | | | | | | |
| Taipower | W | W | L | | D | L | L | | | | | | | | | | | | | | |
| Tatung Taiwan Leopard Cat | W | D | D | D | D | D | W | | | | | | | | | | | | | | |

Updated to match(es) played on 22 November 2026. Source: TFPL
W = Win; D = Draw; L = Loss

== Statistics ==
=== Scoring ===
- First goal of the season:
  (South Korea) Kim Sang-jun (Tainan City TSG) against New Taipei Hang Yuan (13 September 2026)

=== Top goalscorers ===
| Rank | Player | Club | Goals |
|---|---|---|---|
| 1 | (Japan) Rintaro Hama | Kaohsiung Attackers | 5 |
| 2 | (Chinese Taipei) Jhon Benchy | Kaohsiung Attackers | 4 |
| 3 | (Chinese Taipei) Huang Wei-chieh | Sunny Bank AC Taipei | 3 |
| 3 | (Japan) Genki Tateiwa | Kaohsiung Attackers | 3 |
| 3 | (Chinese Taipei) Yao Ko-chi | Tatung Taiwan Leopard Cat | 3 |
| 6 | (Chile) Matias Godoy | Sunny Bank AC Taipei | 2 |
| 6 | (Chinese Taipei) Huang Yung-chun | New Taipei Hang Yuan | 2 |
| 6 | (Chinese Taipei) Lai Wei | Taipower | 2 |
| 6 | (South Korea) Lee Han-hee | Taichung Futuro | 2 |
| 6 | (Brazil) Matheus Porto | Tainan City TSG | 2 |
| 6 | (Czech Republic) Filip Simecek | Taichung Rock | 2 |
| 6 | (Chinese Taipei) Tseng Tzu-le | Tatung Taiwan Leopard Cat | 2 |
| 6 | (Chinese Taipei) Wang Po-ying | New Taipei Hang Yuan | 2 |
| 6 | (Brazil) Wilker | Tainan City TSG | 2 |

=== Clean Sheets ===
| Rank | Player | Club | Shutouts |
|---|---|---|---|
| 1 | (Chinese Taipei) Shih Hsin-an | Tatung Taiwan Leopard Cat | 3 |
| 2 | (Chinese Taipei) Odo Jacobs | New Taipei Hang Yuan | 2 |
| 2 | (Japan) Kenya Matsui | Taichung Futuro | 2 |
| 2 | (Chinese Taipei) Pan Wen-chieh | Tainan City TSG | 2 |
| 2 | (Chinese Taipei) Tsai Yu-hsiang | Kaohsiung Attackers | 2 |
| 6 | (Chinese Taipei) Chang Po-feng | New Taipei Hang Yuan | 1 |
| 6 | (Chinese Taipei) Huang Chiu-lin | Taipower | 1 |
| 6 | (Chinese Taipei) Tuan Hsuan | Sunny Bank AC Taipei | 1 |

=== Discipline ===
==== Player ====
- Most yellow cards: 3
  - (Chinese Taipei) Chao Ming-hsiu (Taipower)
  - (Chinese Taipei) Chen Wei-chuan (Tatung Taiwan Leopard Cat)
  - (Chinese Taipei) Chen Yu-lin (Sunny Bank AC Taipei)
  - (Guatemala) Andy Ruiz (Kaohsiung Attackers)
- Most red cards: 1
  - (Moldova) Nichita Josan (Taichung Rock)
  - (South Korea) Kim Young-geun (Tainan City TSG)
  - (Chinese Taipei) Lee Yu-lin (Taichung Rock)
  - (Chinese Taipei) Lin Chih-hsuan (Tatung Taiwan Leopard Cat)
  - (Chinese Taipei) Wen Chih-hao (Taichung Futuro)

==== Team ====
- Most yellow cards: 13
  - Tainan City TSG
  - Taipower
- Fewest yellow cards: 3
  - Taichung Futuro
- Most red cards: 2
  - Taichung Rock
- Fewest red cards: 0
  - Kaohsiung Attackers
  - New Taipei Hang Yuan
  - Sunny Bank AC Taipei
  - Taipower

== See also ==
- 2026–27 Taiwan Football League 2
- 2026–27 Taiwan Mulan Football League
