= 2025–26 Taiwan Football Premier League =

Taiwan Football Premier League
- Season: 2025–26
- Dates: 17 August 2025 – 30 May 2026
- Champions: Tainan City TSG
- Relegated: Ming Chuan University
- ACGL: Tainan City TSG; New Taipei Hang Yuan
- Matches: 84
- Goals: 238 (2.83 per match)
- Best player: Kim Sung-kyum
- Top goalscorer: Kang Tae-won (12 goals)
- Best goalkeeper: Odo Jacobs
- Biggest home win: New Taipei Hang Yuan 7–0 Ming Chuan University (30 November 2025)
- Biggest away win: Ming Chuan University 0–6 Tainan City TSG (14 September 2025)
- Highest scoring: Ming Chuan University 3–4 Taipower (26 October 2025); New Taipei Hang Yuan 7–0 Ming Chuan University (30 November 2025); Tainan City TSG 4–3 Taipower (12 April 2026)
- Longest winning run: New Taipei Hang Yuan (5 matches)
- Longest unbeaten run: Tainan City TSG (11 matches)
- Longest winless run: Ming Chuan University (17 matches)
- Longest losing run: Ming Chuan University (9 matches)
- All statistics correct as of 10 July 2026.

The 2025–26 Taiwan Football Premier League was the ninth season of Taiwan Football Premier League, the top-flight association football competition in Taiwan under its current format. Starting from this season, the league changed to July-June season format. The season began on 17 August 2025 and finished on 30 May 2026.

== Teams ==
=== Promotions and relegations ===
There are 8 teams in the league, including 7 teams from the 2024 season and 1 team promoted from the 2024 League 2.

==== Teams relegated to League 2 ====
Taipei Vikings was the only team relegated after finishing last place in the previous season, ending their one year stay in the top tier. However, Taipei Vikings didn't participate in the 2025 Taiwan President FA Cup, led them to forfeit their playing spot in League 2 for the 2025–26 season.

==== Teams promoted from League 2 ====
Taichung Rock, the champions of League 2 in 2024 earned automatic promotion and was the only team promoted after Inter Taoyuan had lost 1–2 to Ming Chuan University in the promotion/relegation playoffs.

Promoted from 2024 League 2	Relegated from 2024 TFPL
Taichung Rock	Taipei Vikings

=== Teams and locations ===
Team	Chinese	Based in	Seasons in TFPL	First season in TFPL
Ming Chuan University	銘傳大學	Taoyuan City	7	2017
New Taipei Hang Yuan	新北航源	New Taipei City	9	2017
Sunny Bank AC Taipei	陽信北競	Taipei City	4	2022
Taichung Futuro	台中Futuro	Taichung City	7	2019
Taichung Rock	台中磐石	Taichung City	1	2025–26
Tainan City TSG	南市台鋼	Tainan City	9	2017
Taipower	台灣電力	Kaohsiung City	9	2017
Tatung	大同	Taipei City	9	2017

=== Venues ===
Taiwan Football Premier League teams currently don't play all their home games in a specific home ground. All venues will hold two different matches in a single matchday.

Location of venues in 2025–26 Taiwan Football Premier League

Stadium	Chinese	Location	Capacity
Fu Jen Catholic University Stadium	輔仁大學足球場	New Taipei City	3,000
Kaohsiung Nanzih Football Stadium	高雄市立楠梓足球場	Kaohsiung City	1,200
Ming Chuan University Taoyuan Campus	銘傳大學龜山校區	Taoyuan City	5,000
Tainan Municipal Football Field	臺南市立足球場	Tainan City	2,000
Taipei Municipal Stadium	臺北田徑場	Taipei City	20,000
Taiyuan Football Field	太原足球場	Taichung City	600
Xitun Football Field	西屯足球場	Taichung City	200

=== Foreign players ===
- Players name in **bold** indicates the player was registered during the mid-season transfer window.

Ming Chuan University	New Taipei Hang Yuan	Sunny Bank AC Taipei	Taichung Futuro	Taichung Rock	Tainan City TSG	Taipower	Tatung
**(United States) Jackson Etheridge** (Chile) Matías Godoy; ~~(Japan) Mashu Minamitani~~ **(South Korea) Oh Tae-gyun** **(Australia) Bradley Sibanda** **(Chile) Bryan Vega** **(Chile) Angelo Vergara** (Burkina Faso) Gaël Zabramba	(Honduras) Elías Argueta (Japan) Naoki Kaneko (Japan) Shingo Koreeda (South Korea) Kwon Seung-seong; ~~(Japan) Takuto Miki~~ (Japan) Kentaro Sato (Japan) Genki Tateiwa	(Guatemala) Gustavo Arreaga (Japan) Yugo Ichiyanagi (Japan) Ryosei Kamada; ~~(Japan) Kenshin Katata~~ (Japan) Tsuyoshi Kusuyama (Japan) Jun Uchida (Japan) Naoyuki Yamazaki	(Japan) Kenya Matsui (Mongolia) Munkh-Orgil Orkhon **(Japan) Shoya Nagata** (Japan) Keisuke Ogawa (Japan) Ryota Saito (Japan) Nagisa Sakurauchi (Japan) Kaoru Takayama (Japan) Shohei Yokoyama	(Japan) Sora Yamauchi	~~(Argentina) Facundo Aranda~~ (Argentina) Esteban Gómez (France) Diocounda Gory (South Korea) Kim Sang-jun (South Korea) Kim Sung-kyum **(South Korea) Kim Young-geun** **(South Korea) Oh Se-sim** (Brazil) Matheus Porto; ~~(France) Mohamed Sakkouh~~	—N/a	~~(Turkey) Ertuğrul Bastug~~ **(United States) Clovis Fahn** (Japan) Yunosuke Fukasawa (Japan) Taiyo Izumi (Japan) Jun Kochi (Japan) Yamato Kumagai (Kenya) Nichodemus Malika **(Kenya) Enock Wanyama**

=== Personnel and sponsorship ===
Team	Manager	Captain	Kit manufacturer	Main kit sponsor
Ming Chuan University	(Taiwan) Tseng Tai-lin	(Chinese Taipei) Ng Pui Hei	(Taiwan) Hetian	—N/a
New Taipei Hang Yuan	(Taiwan) Hung Chin-hwai	(Chinese Taipei) Huang Yung-chun	(Taiwan) Entes	—N/a
Sunny Bank AC Taipei	(Spain) Abel Lorenzo	(Japan) Yugo Ichiyanagi	(China) Ucan	Sunny Bank
Taichung Futuro	(Taiwan) Fang Ching-ren	(Chinese Taipei) Chen Ting-yang	(Spain) Joma	Taichung City Government
Taichung Rock	(Japan) Yoshiharu Ezoe	(Chinese Taipei) Wang Yi-you	(Spain) Joma	S.Pellegrino
Tainan City TSG	(Spain) Carlos Garcia	(Chinese Taipei) Wu Chun-ching	(Spain) Kelme	Taiwan Steel Group
Taipower	(Taiwan) Chen Chieh-jen	(Chinese Taipei) Chen Chao-an	(Spain) Joma	Taipower
Tatung	(Taiwan) Liu Cheng-ho	(Kenya) Nichodemus Malika	(Taiwan) Entes	Tatung

=== Managerial changes ===
Team	Outgoing manager	Manner of departure	Date of vacancy	Position in table	Incoming manager	Date of appointment
Tainan City TSG	(France) Raphael Blanchon	Assigned to assistant coach	1 December 2024	Pre-season	(Taiwan) Chang Wu-yeh	11 August 2025
Taichung Rock	(Taiwan) Lin Chi-fu	End of contract	8 December 2024	Pre-season	(France) Raphael Blanchon	21 July 2025
Tatung	(Taiwan) Chiang Mu-tsai	Signed by Vikings	15 January 2025	Pre-season	(Taiwan) Liu Cheng-ho	18 March 2025
Sunny Bank AC Taipei	(Taiwan) Chen Sing-an	Assigned to Chinese Taipei	19 May 2025	Pre-season	(Spain) Abel Lorenzo	10 August 2025
Tainan City TSG	(Taiwan) Chang Wu-yeh	Undisclosed	2 November 2025	5th	(Spain) Carlos Garcia	23 November 2025
Taichung Rock	(France) Raphael Blanchon	Undisclosed	3 November 2025	4th	(Malaysia) Choir Chee Keat (caretaker)	23 November 2025
Taipower	(Taiwan) Huang Che-ming	Undisclosed	3 November 2025	2nd	(Taiwan) Chen Chieh-jen	23 November 2025
Taichung Rock	(Malaysia) Choir Chee Keat	End of caretaker spell	2 March 2026	5th	(Japan) Yoshiharu Ezoe	8 March 2026

== League table ==
Pos	Team	Pld	W	D	L	GF	GA	GD	Pts	Qualification or relegation
1	Tainan City TSG (C)	21	13	5	3	44	19	+25	44	Qualification for the AFC Challenge League preliminary stage
2	New Taipei Hang Yuan	21	13	2	6	35	15	+20	41	Qualification for the AFC Challenge League preliminary stage
3	Sunny Bank AC Taipei	21	11	6	4	29	22	+7	39	
4	Taichung Futuro	21	11	1	9	34	22	+12	34	
5	Taichung Rock	21	8	6	7	28	30	−2	30	
6	Tatung	21	6	6	9	27	28	−1	24	
7	Taipower	21	5	5	11	27	33	−6	20	Qualification for the promotion–relegation playoffs
8	Ming Chuan University (R)	21	1	1	19	14	69	−55	4	Relegation to Taiwan Football League 2

Rules for classification: 1) Points; 2) Head-to-head points; 3) Head-to-head goal difference; 4) Head-to-head goals scored; 5) Overall goal difference; 6) Overall goals scored; 7) Fewer disciplinary points; 8) Draw lots
(C) Champions; (R) Relegated

== Position by round ==
Team ╲ Round	1	2	3	4	5	6	7	8	9	10	11	12	13	14	15	16	17	18	19	20	21
Ming Chuan University	8	8	8	7	8	8	8	8	8	8	8	8	8	8	8	8	8	8	8	8	8
New Taipei Hang Yuan	5	6	3	2	1	2	3	2	2	1	1	1	1	1	2	2	2	2	2	3	2
Sunny Bank AC Taipei	4	1	1	4	2	3	1	1	1	2	2	2	3	2	3	3	3	3	3	1	3
Tatung	1	2	5	5	5	7	6	4	5	4	4	5	6	5	5	6	6	6	6	6	6
Taichung Futuro	5	3	6	8	7	5	7	7	6	7	5	4	4	4	4	5	4	4	4	4	4
Taichung Rock	3	4	7	6	6	6	4	6	7	5	7	6	5	6	6	4	5	5	5	5	5
Tainan City TSG	5	7	4	3	4	4	5	3	3	3	3	3	2	3	1	1	1	1	1	2	1
Taipower	2	5	2	1	3	1	2	5	4	6	6	7	7	7	7	7	7	7	7	7	7

= Champions and qualification for the AFC Challenge League preliminary stage; = Qualification for the AFC Challenge League preliminary stage; = Qualification for the promotion–relegation playoffs; = Relegation to Taiwan Football League 2

== Results ==
=== Regular season ===
Each team plays a total of 21 games, playing the other teams three times.

Home \ Away	MCU	NTH	SAC	TCF	TCR	TSG	TPW	TAT	MCU	NTH	SAC	TCF	TCR	TSG	TPW	TAT	MCU	NTH	SAC	TCF	TCR	TSG	TPW	TAT
Ming Chuan University		0–1	1–2	2–1	0–1	0–6	3–4	1–5		2–3	0–3	—	—	—	—	1–4		—	—	—	—	—	—	—
New Taipei Hang Yuan	7–0		1–0	2–0	3–0	1–2	1–1	2–1	—		2–0	0–1	0–2	1–1	2–0	—	—		—	—	—	—	—	—
Sunny Bank AC Taipei	2–1	2–1		2–1	2–2	2–2	0–0	2–2	—	—		—	—	1–0	1–0	—	—	—		—	—	—	—	—
Taichung Futuro	3–1	1–2	0–1		4–0	0–1	1–1	5–0	4–0	—	1–2		0–1	—	—	—	—	—	—		—	—	—	—
Taichung Rock	1–1	2–1	3–1	0–1		0–0	0–2	0–1	3–0	—	1–2	—		2–4	2–2	1–0	—	—	—	—		—	—	—
Tainan City TSG	5–0	1–0	1–0	2–3	3–3		3–0	2–1	4–0	—	—	2–1	—		4–3	1–0	—	—	—	—	—		—	—
Taipower	3–1	0–2	1–2	1–2	1–2	2–1		—	3–0	—	—	1–2	—	—		—	—	—	—	—	—	—		—
Tatung	4–0	0–1	1–1	1–2	2–2	0–0	2–1		—	0–3	1–1	0–1	—	—	1–0		—	—	—	—	—	—	1–1	

Source: TFPL
Legend: Blue = home team win; Yellow = draw; Red = away team win.

=== Results by round ===
Team ╲ Round	1	2	3	4	5	6	7	8	9	10	11	12	13	14	15	16	17	18	19	20	21
Ming Chuan University	L	L	L	W	L	L	L	L	L	L	L	L	L	D	L	L	L	L	L	L	L
New Taipei Hang Yuan	L	W	W	D	W	L	L	W	W	W	W	W	L	W	L	W	L	W	W	D	W
Sunny Bank AC Taipei	W	W	D	L	W	D	W	W	D	D	D	W	L	L	W	W	D	W	W	W	L
Taichung Futuro	L	W	L	L	D	W	L	L	W	L	W	W	W	W	L	L	W	W	W	W	L
Taichung Rock	W	L	L	D	D	D	W	L	L	W	L	D	W	D	W	W	D	W	L	L	W
Tainan City TSG	L	D	W	W	D	W	W	W	W	W	D	D	W	L	W	W	W	L	W	D	W
Taipower	W	L	W	D	D	W	L	L	D	L	L	L	W	L	L	L	D	L	L	W	D
Tatung	W	D	D	D	L	L	W	W	L	D	W	L	L	W	W	L	D	L	L	L	D

Source: TFPL
W = Win; D = Draw; L = Loss

== Promotion–relegation playoffs ==
7 June 2026
15:30 (UTC+8)

Taipower	3–0	MCU Desafio
Yang Chen-ying 17'; Lai Wei 45+1'; Yeh Ching-chun 49'	Recap

Kaohsiung Nanzih Football Stadium, Kaohsiung
Referee: Kuo Chan-yu

== Statistics ==
=== Scoring ===
- First goal of the season:
  (Taiwan) Kung Chih-yu (Taichung Rock) against New Taipei Hang Yuan (17 August 2025)
- Last goal of the season:
  (Taiwan) Jhon Benchy (Tainan City TSG) against New Taipei Hang Yuan (30 May 2026)

=== Top goalscorers ===
Rank	Player	Club	Goals
1	(Taiwan) Kang Tae-won	New Taipei Hang Yuan	12
2	(Taiwan) Jhon Benchy	Tainan City TSG	10
2	(Brazil) Matheus Porto	Tainan City TSG	10
2	(Taiwan) Yu Chia-huang	Tatung	10
5	(Taiwan) Huang Wei-chieh	Sunny Bank AC Taipei	8
5	(Taiwan) Lai Yi-chiao	Taichung Futuro	8
7	(Japan) Ryota Saito	Taichung Futuro	7
7	(Japan) Sora Yamauchi	Taichung Rock	7
9	(Chile) Matias Godoy	Ming Chuan University	6
10	(Taiwan) Chen Chao-an	Taipower	5
10	(Taiwan) Liu Chien-wei	Taichung Rock	5
10	(Taiwan) Yao Ko-chi	Tainan City TSG	5
10	(Taiwan) Yeh Ching-chun	Taipower	5

==== Hat-tricks ====
Player	For	Against	Score	Date	Round
(Taiwan) Yao Ko-chi	Tainan City TSG	Ming Chuan University	6–0 (A)	14 September 2025	3
(Taiwan) Lai Yi-chiao	Taichung Futuro	Tatung	5–0 (H)	26 October 2025	6
(Taiwan) Kang Tae-won	New Taipei Hang Yuan	Ming Chuan University	7–0 (H)	30 November 2025	9
(Taiwan) Jhon Benchy	Tainan City TSG	Taipower	4–3 (H)	12 April 2026	15

==== Own goals ====
Player	For	Against	Date	Round
(Taiwan) Chao Wei-chieh	Tatung	Taichung Rock	21 September 2025	4
(Taiwan) Lee Hung-chun	Taichung Rock	New Taipei Hang Yuan	23 November 2025	8
(United States) Jackson Etheridge	Ming Chuan University	Taipower	1 March 2026	13
(Taiwan) Liao Chieh-yang	Taipower	Tatung	8 March 2026	14
(Taiwan) Huang Chun-lin	New Taipei Hang Yuan	Taichung Rock	12 April 2026	15
(Taiwan) Shih Cheng-hsi	Tatung	Taipower	24 May 2026	21

=== Clean Sheets ===
Rank	Player	Club	Shutouts
1	(Taiwan) Odo Jacobs	New Taipei Hang Yuan	8
2	(Taiwan) Pan Wen-chieh	Tainan City TSG	7
3	(Japan) Kenya Matsui	Taichung Futuro	5
4	(Taiwan) Tsai Yu-hsiang	Taichung Rock	4
4	(Taiwan) Tuan Hsuan	Sunny Bank AC Taipei	4
6	(Taiwan) Chang Po-feng	New Taipei Hang Yuan	3
6	(Japan) Jun Kochi	Tatung	3
6	(Taiwan) Tsai Shuo-che	Tainan City TSG	3
9	(Taiwan) Huang Chiu-lin	Taipower	2
9	(Taiwan) Huang Huai-hsien	Taichung Rock	2

=== Discipline ===
==== Player ====
- Most yellow cards: 9
  - (Taiwan) Chen Yen-jui (Sunny Bank AC Taipei)
  - (Taiwan) Chen Yu-lin (Sunny Bank AC Taipei)
- Most red cards: 1
  - (Taiwan) Chang Yu-cheng (Ming Chuan University)
  - (Taiwan) Chen Chao-an (Taipower)
  - (Taiwan) Chen Yen-jui (Sunny Bank AC Taipei)
  - (Taiwan) Chen Yu-lin (Sunny Bank AC Taipei)
  - (Taiwan) Hsieh Po-an (Taipower)
  - (South Korea) Kim Sang-jun (Tainan City TSG)
  - (Japan) Kenya Matsui (Taichung Futuro)
  - (France) Mohamed Sakkouh (Tainan City TSG)
  - (Japan) Genki Tateiwa (New Taipei Hang Yuan)
  - (Taiwan) Tsai Chieh-hsun (Taichung Futuro)
  - (Taiwan) Tsai Chun-sheng (Taichung Rock)
  - (Taiwan) Wang Po-ying (New Taipei Hang Yuan)
  - (Taiwan) Yeh Ching-chun (Taipower)

==== Team ====
- Most yellow cards: 55
  - Tainan City TSG
- Fewest yellow cards: 22
  - New Taipei Hang Yuan
- Most red cards: 3
  - Taipower
- Fewest red cards: 0
  - Tatung

== Awards ==
Award	Winner	Club	Ref.
Player of the Year	(South Korea) Kim Sung-kyum	Tainan City TSG	
Coach of the Year	(Spain) Carlos Garcia	Tainan City TSG	
Golden Boot	(Taiwan) Kang Tae-won	New Taipei Hang Yuan	
Golden Gloves	(Taiwan) Odo Jacobs	New Taipei Hang Yuan	

== See also ==
- 2025–26 Taiwan Football League 2
- 2025–26 Taiwan Mulan Football League
