= Chen Sing-an =

Taiwanese footballer and manager

Chen Sing-an 陳信安
Personal information
- Date of birth: December 7, 1962 (age 63)
- Place of birth: Taiwan

Team information
- Current team: AC Taipei (head coach)

International career
Years	Team	Apps	(Gls)
1982–1992	Chinese Taipei		

Managerial career
- 1999–2000: Chinese Taipei U-23
- 2008–2009: Chinese Taipei
- 2025: Chinese Taipei (caretaker)
- 2025–: AC Taipei

Chen Sing-an (Chinese: 陳信安; pinyin: Chén Xìn'ān, born in 1962) is a Taiwanese football manager. He is currently the head coach for Taiwan Football Premier League club AC Taipei. He had previously managed the Chinese Taipei national football team.

As a player, Chen had played for Flying Camel and Chinese Taipei for 10 years, from 1982 to 1992. He scored a goal against New Zealand in the 1986 FIFA World Cup qualifying rounds.

He retired from playing in 1993 and took the position of Flying Camel's head coach till 2001. Later, he managed Chinese Taipei national under-23 football team from 1999 to 2000. He became Chinese Taipei senior team's Head Coach in 2008 and then Chinese Taipei U-15's Head Coach in 2011.
