= Kang Tae-won =

South Korean-born Taiwanese footballer (born 2000)

Personal information
- Date of birth: 3 March 2000 (age 26)
- Place of birth: Seoul, South Korea
- Height: 1.75 m (5 ft 9 in)
- Position: Midfielder

Team information
- Current team: Kaohsiung Attackers

Youth career
- 2010–2012: Seoul Shinyongsan Elementary School
- 2013–2015: Seil Middle School
- 2016–2018: Suwon Samsung Bluewings

College career
Years	Team	Apps	(Gls)
2019–2020	Soongsil University		

Senior career*
Years	Team	Apps	(Gls)
2021–2023	Suwon Samsung Bluewings	0	(0)
2024	Hwaseong	21	(0)
2025–2026	Hang Yuan	2	(1)
2026–	Kaohsiung Attackers		

International career^{‡}
2024–	Chinese Taipei	7	(0)
- * Club domestic league appearances and goals as of 24 August 2025 ‡ National team caps and goals as of 13 November 2026

Kang Tae-won (Korean: 강태원; Chinese: 姜泰源 Jiang Tai-yuan; born 3 March 2000) is a professional footballer who plays as a midfielder for Taiwan Football Premier League club Kaohsiung Attackers. Born in South Korea, he represents Chinese Taipei at international level.

== Early life ==
Kang was born on 3 March 2000 in Seoul, South Korea to a Taiwanese father and a South Korean mother. He attended Seoul Shinyongsan Elementary School, Seil Middle School, and Soongsil University in South Korea. As a youth player, he joined the youth academy of South Korean side Suwon Samsung Bluewings. He was described as "one of the most promising prospects" while playing for the club.

== Club career ==
On 26 May 2021, Kang made his senior debut for Suwon Samsung Bluewings during a 0–0 draw that ends in a victory through a penalty-shootout against FC Anyang in the round of 16 of Korean FA Cup. He suffered an injury which significantly cut his playing time for Suwon.

In 2024, he signed for K3 League side Hwaseong FC for a season.

After being clubless for almost a year, in July 2025 he signed with Taiwanese side Hang Yuan. On 17 August 2025, Kang scored on his debut match for the club against Taichung Rock in a 1–2 defeat.

After scoring 12 goals in the league, Kang was announced the golden boot winner of the 2025/26 season Taiwan Football Premier League on the ceremony held on 12 June 2026.

On 11 July 2026, newly promoted side Kaohsiung Attackers announced Kang's arrival.

== International career ==
Born in South Korea to a Taiwanese father and South Korean mother, Kang is eligible to represent either South Korea or Chinese Taipei. In September 2024, Kang was first called up by the Chinese Taipei national team for a training camp. In November 2024, Kang made his international debut in a 3–2 friendly win over Singapore.

== Style of play ==
Kang mainly operates as a left-footed central midfielder. At Suwon's youth academy, Kang is known for his passing ability.
