= Taichung Rock FC =

Taichung Rock
- Full name: Taichung Rock Football Club
- Short name: TCRFC
- Founded: 2024; 2 years ago
- Ground: Xitun Football Field
- Capacity: 200
- Chairman: Feng Shih-wen
- Head coach: Martino Sofia
- League: Taiwan Football Premier League
- 2025–26: TFPL, 5th of 8
- Website: https://www.tcrfc.tw/
Home colours	Away colours

Taichung Rock Football Club (Chinese: 台中磐石) is a professional football club based in Taichung, Taiwan which currently competes in the Taiwan Football Premier League.

== History ==
Taichung Rock was founded in 2024 by the Sports Agglomerate Company Limited, after receiving the Taiwan Football League 2 spot via Land Home NTUS. The team won the championship in their inaugural season and was promoted to the 2025–26 Taiwan Football Premier League. In 2025, the team was split into two to participate in 2025 Taiwan President FA Cup. The B-team qualified from the 2025–26 Taiwan Football League 2 qualifier. In 2026, the B-team was dissolved after their one year stay in the League 2.

== Kits ==
=== Kit manufacturers and shirt sponsors ===
Period	Kit manufacturer	Shirt sponsor (chest)
2024–2025	—	Subkarma
2026	Joma	S.Pellegrino
2026–present	Athleta	S.Pellegrino

== Players ==
As of 22 November 2026

Note: Flags indicate national team as defined under FIFA eligibility rules; some limited exceptions apply. Players may hold more than one non-FIFA nationality.

No.	Pos.	Nation	Player
4	DF	TPE	Tsai Chun-sheng
5	MF	TPE	Chou Yu-chieh (captain)
6	DF	TPE	Sun En-chi
7	MF	TPE	Kung Chih-yu
9	FW	TPE	Liu Chien-wei
10	MF	CZE	Filip Simecek
11	FW	TPE	Yang Chao-jing
12	DF	TPE	Lee Yu-lin
13	DF	TPE	Chen Po-wei
14	FW	TPE	Lee Wei-lun
16	MF	TPE	Wei Chih-chuan
18	MF	MDA	Nichita Josan
24	DF	GER	Dominik Limprecht

No.	Pos.	Nation	Player
25	GK	SRB	Igor Zavis
27	FW	TPE	Shih Jing-tang
28	MF	TPE	Chen Chih-wei
29	MF	TPE	Chiang Chun-yao
32	MF	TPE	Ko Yueh-ting
35	MF	TPE	Lee Hung-chun
37	MF	TPE	Liang Hao-teng
44	FW	JPN	Sora Yamauchi
45	MF	TPE	Hu Yu-hsiang
66	DF	TPE	Zeng Yun-hao
70	GK	ITA	Andrea Boschi
78	DF	ITA	Lorenzo Costa
99	GK	TPE	Lin Chun-hua

== Management ==
=== Coaching staff ===
Position	Staff
Head coach	(Italy) Martino Sofia
Assistant coach	(Italy) Thomas Castello
Goalkeeping coach	(Brazil) Juliano Rodrigues
Strength and conditioning coach	(Taiwan) Chiang Yi-fan

=== Club personnel ===
Position	Name
Chairman	(Taiwan) Feng Shih-wen
Representative	(Taiwan) Lee Feng-lin
Technical advisor	(Hong Kong) Chan Hiu Ming

== Records ==
=== Year-by-year ===
Season	League											Position	President FA Cup	International/Continental		Top goalscorer(s)	
Season	Div	League	Pld	W	D	L	GF	GA	GD	Pts	PPG	Position	President FA Cup	International/Continental		Name(s)	Goals
2024	2	League 2	10	7	1	2	32	10	+22	22	2.20	1st	Not held	DNQ		(Chinese Taipei) Yang Chao-jing	9
2025–26	1	TFPL	21	8	6	7	28	30	-2	30	1.43	5th	QF	DNQ		(Chinese Taipei) Shih Jing-tang (Japan) Sora Yamauchi	7
2026–27	1	TFPL											Not held	DNQ			
Total	–	–	31	15	7	9	60	40	+20	52	1.68	–	–	–	–		

1. Top goalscorer(s) includes all goals scored in League, Taiwan President FA Cup, and other competitive continental matches but excludes goals in their qualifying matches.

=== Head coaches ===
Head coach	Nat.	Tenure
Lin Chi-fu	Taiwan	2024
Chou Yu-hsuan	Taiwan	2025 (President FA Cup)
Raphael Blanchon	France	2025
Khor Chee Keat	Malaysia	2025–2026 (caretaker)
Yoshiharu Ezoe	Japan	2026
Martino Sofia	Italy	2026–present

=== Captains ===
Name	Nat.	Years
Yang Chao-jing	Taiwan	2024
Chen Po-wei	Taiwan	2025 (President FA Cup)
Lee Hung-chun	Taiwan	2025–2026
Wang Yi-you	Taiwan	2026

== Honours ==
Type	Competition	Titles	Seasons
Domestic	Taiwan Football League 2	1	2024
