= National University of Kaohsiung =

Public university in Nanzi, Kaohsiung, Taiwan

Coordinates: 22°43′59.89″N 120°17′04.83″E

- 國立高雄大學
- Motto: 博學 弘毅 創新 崇德
- Motto in English: Erudition, responsibility, innovation, virtue.
- Type: Public
- Established: 2000; 26 years ago
- Affiliations: National University System of Taiwan
- Principal: Yueh-tuan Chen PhD.
- Location: No. 700, Kaohsiung University Road, Nanzih District, Kaohsiung, Taiwan
- Website: www.nuk.edu.tw

National University of Kaohsiung
- Simplified Chinese: 国立高雄大学
- Traditional Chinese: 國立高雄大學
Transcriptions
Standard Mandarin
- Hanyu Pinyin: Guólì Gāoxióng Dàxué
Southern Min
- Hokkien POJ: Kok-li̍p Ko-hiông Tāi-ha̍k

The National University of Kaohsiung (NUK; Chinese: 國立高雄大學; Pe̍h-ōe-jī: Kok-li̍p Ko-hiông Tāi-ha̍k) is a public university located in Kaohsiung, Taiwan, and a member of the National University System of Taiwan.

== History ==
NUK was founded in February 2000, aims to narrow the gap in education between southern and northern Taiwan and promote the economy of the southern area.

There are twenty departments in the university, including Western Languages and Literature, East Asian Language and Literature, Architecture, Creative Design, Kinesiology, Health and Leisure Studies, Law, Government and Law, Economic and Financial Law, Applied Economics, Applied Mathematics, Applied Chemistry, Electrical Engineering, Civil and Environmental Engineering, Life Sciences, and Asia-Pacific Industrial and Business Management, Traditional Arts, Finance, Information Management, and Applied physics.

== Features ==
An unusual feature in this school is its open space. There are no walls on the boundaries of the campus. Residents who live around this school often walk to campus or exercise by using equipment in the gym. Biodiversity is also a notable characteristic of NUK. There are more than 60 sorts of fish in pond of the Water Land Park.

== Academics ==
NUK has five colleges:

College of Humanities and Social Sciences	Department	Bachelor	Master	PhD
College of Humanities and Social Sciences	Dept. of Western Languages and Literature	✔	✔	
College of Humanities and Social Sciences	Dept. of East Asian Languages and Literature	✔	✔	
College of Humanities and Social Sciences	Dept. of Kinesiology, Health, and Leisure Studies	✔	✔	
College of Humanities and Social Sciences	Dept. of Athletic Performance	✔		
College of Humanities and Social Sciences	Dept. of Architecture	✔	✔	
College of Humanities and Social Sciences	Dept. of Crafts and Creative Design	✔		
College of Law	Dept. of Law	✔	✔	✔
College of Law	Dept. of Government and Law	✔	✔	
College of Law	Dept. of Economic and Financial Law	✔	✔	
College of Management	Dept. of Applied Economics	✔	✔	
College of Management	Dept. of Asia-Pacific Industrial and Business Management	✔	✔	
College of Management	Dept. of Finance	✔	✔	
College of Management	Dept. of Information Management	✔	✔	
College of Management	Institute of Business and Management		✔	
College of Management	International Master of Business Management		✔	
College of Science	Dept. of Applied Mathematics	✔	✔	✔
College of Science	Dept. of Applied Physics	✔	✔	
College of Science	Dept. of Applied Chemistry	✔	✔	
College of Science	Dept. of Life Sciences	✔	✔	
College of Science	Institute of Statistics		✔	
College of Engineering	Dept. of Electrical Engineering	✔	✔	✔
College of Engineering	Dept. of Civil and Environmental Engineering	✔	✔	
College of Engineering	Dept. of Chemical and Materials Engineering	✔	✔	
College of Engineering	Dept. of Computer Science and Information Engineering	✔	✔	

== Ranking ==
National University of Kaohsiung rankings

Global – Overall
- CWUR World: 1865 (2021)
- THE World: 1501+ (2024)

Regional – Overall
- QS Asia: 751-800 (2025)
- THE Asia: 601+ (2024)

National – Overall
- CWUR National: 38 (2021)
- THE National: 35–45 (2024)

== Relevant articles ==
- National University System of Taiwan
- National Sun Yat-sen University
