= Yingfeng Riverside Park =

Park in Taipei, Taiwan

- 迎風河濱公園
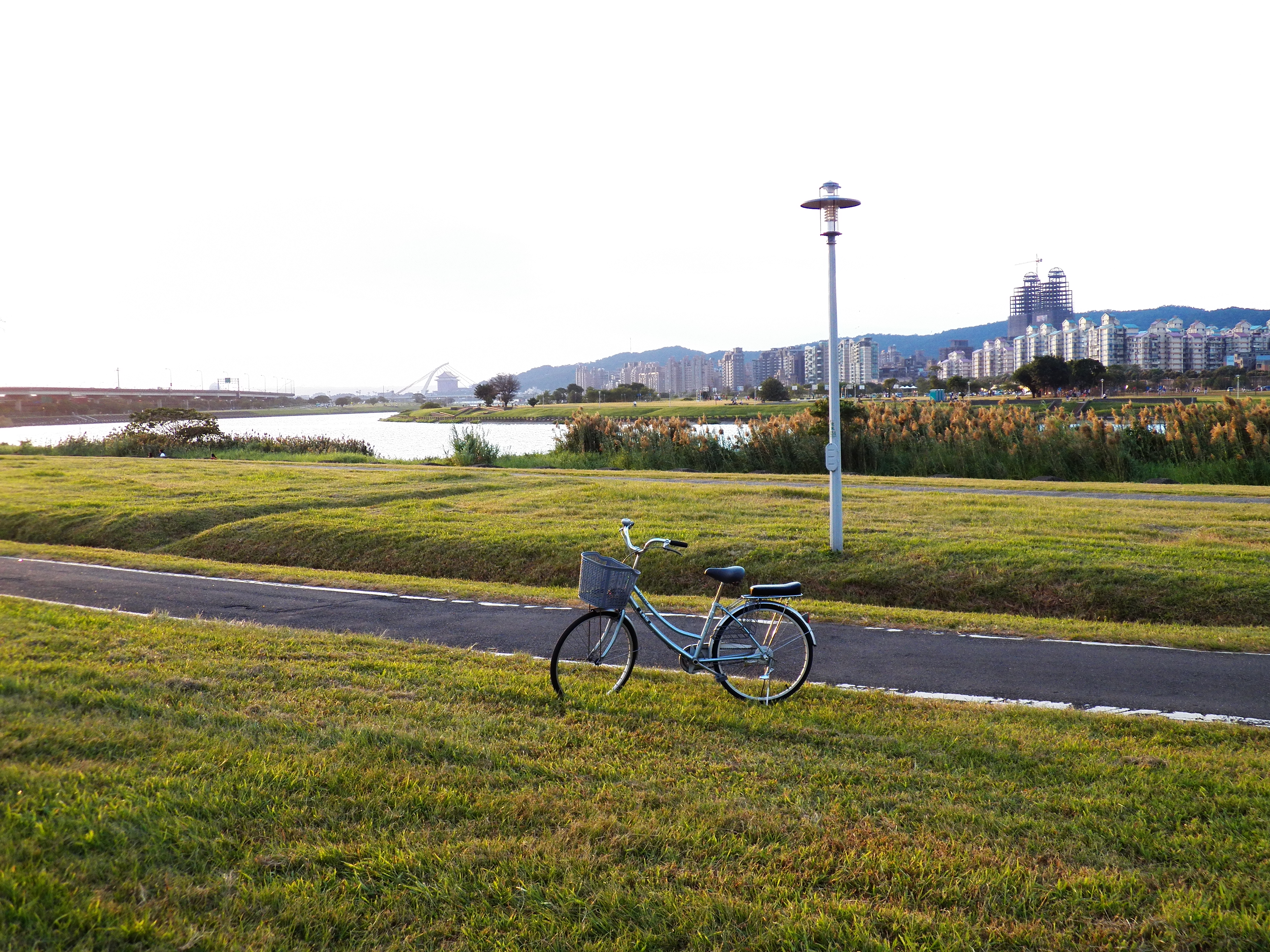
- Interactive map of Yingfeng Riverside Park
- Type: park
- Location: Zhongshan and Songshan in Taipei, Taiwan
- Coordinates: 25°04′27.6″N 121°32′44.6″E
- Area: 67 hectares (170 acres)
- Established: 2002
- Public transit: Dazhi Station

The Yingfeng Riverside Park (traditional Chinese: 迎風河濱公園; simplified Chinese: 迎风河滨公园; pinyin: Yíngfēng Hébīn Gōngyuán) is a park along the Keelung River in Zhongshan District and Songshan District of Taipei, Taiwan.

== History ==
The park was completed in 2002.

== Geography ==
The park covers an area of 60 hectares.

== Facilities ==
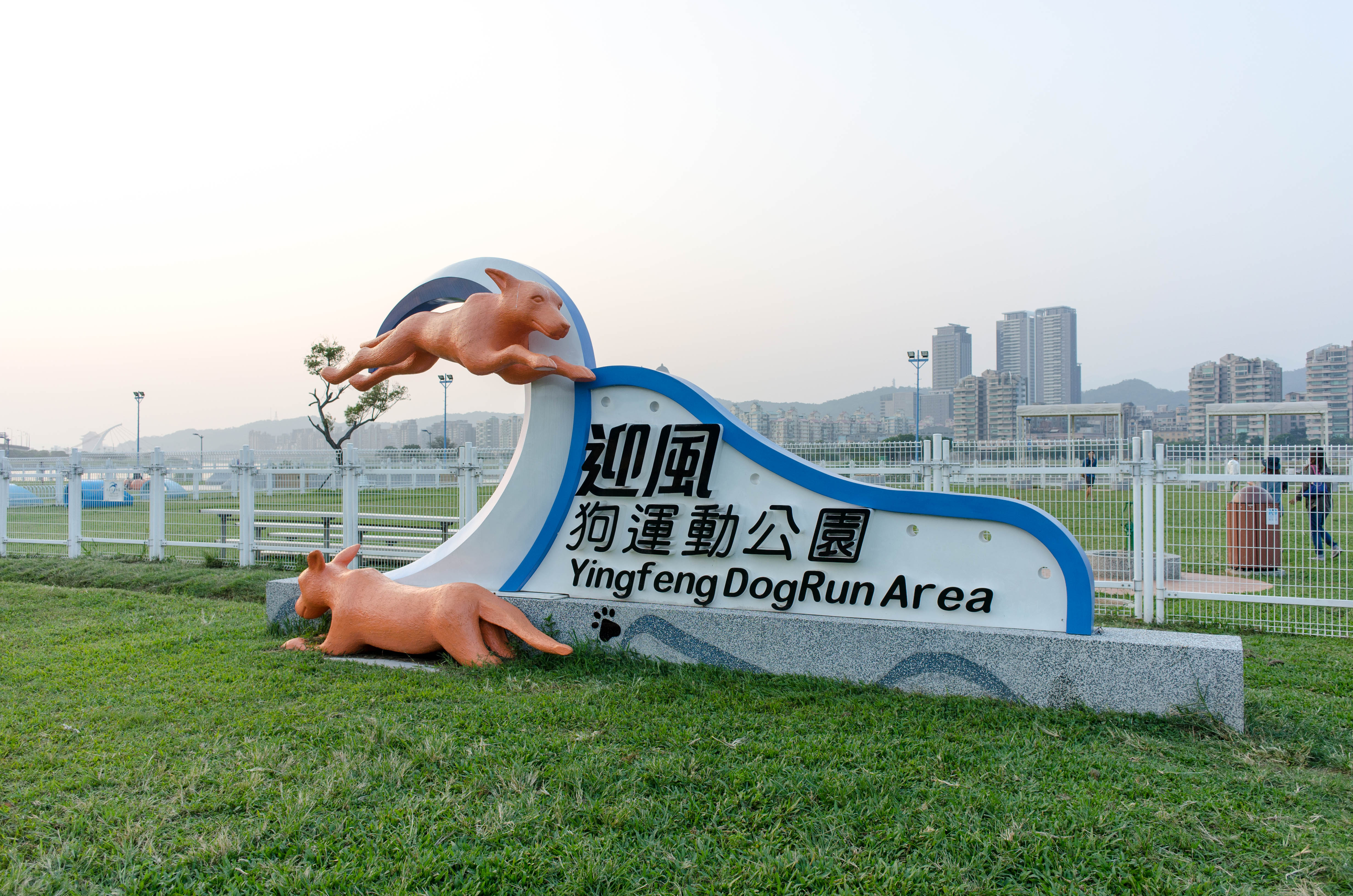
Yingfeng Dog Run Area

The park features facilities for skating, softball, football, baseball, wood ball and miniature golf. The park also features Taiwan's first leash-free sports park for dogs, which measures approximately 1 hectare in area and contains two parts, one for big canines and the other for smaller ones. It includes dog-waste removers, eight benches and four wash basins.

== Transportation ==
The park is accessible within walking distance south of Dazhi Station of Taipei Metro.

== See also ==
- List of parks in Taiwan
- Guanshan Riverside Park
