= Sunny Bank AC Taipei =

Taiwanese football club

- Full name: Sunny Bank Athletic Club Taipei
- Nickname: The Tigers
- Founded: 2010; 16 years ago
- Ground: Xizhi Sports Field
- Capacity: 466
- Owner: Chen Sing-an
- Head coach: Abel Lorenzo
- League: Taiwan Football Premier League
- 2025–26: TFPL, 3rd of 8
- Website: https://actaipei.com/
Home colours	Away colours

Athletic Club Taipei (Chinese: 陽信台北競技; pinyin: Táiběi jìngjì), previously known as Andy Chen Academy and known as Sunny Bank Athletic Club Taipei (abbreviated as A. C. Taipei) for commercial reasons, is a professional football club based in Taipei, Taiwan that competes in the Taiwan Football Premier League.

== History ==
In 2010, the club started as a football academy Little Peacock Club, and was later renamed as Andy Chen Academy. In 2017, the academy collaborated with Chelsea F.C. Hong Kong Soccer School to introduce Chelsea F.C.'s youth training system to the academy. The academy committed $2 million NTD to build five artificial turf pitches. Academy's owner, Chen Sing-an, planned to make the club to be the first Asian Football Confederation qualified Taiwanese football club. Their youth players can also play for their respective schools, colleges, or university in youth tournaments, to enable competitive football experience since their players' youth.

In 2020, their first-team was formed, with the self-proclaimed long and short-term ambitions of playing on Taiwan's top-flight league; representing Taiwan at the AFC Cup; and introducing their academy players to the first-team matches, as they were granted a Taiwan Club License, debuted in the 2020 Taiwan Challenge League.

They made their official debut on July 18, 2020, when they lost 5–2 away to CPC Corporation. During the season, they earned 28 points in 14 matches. But, they still were unable to be promoted to the first division, as they finished in 3rd place. Despite having a 14 positive goal difference advantage, they finished 3 points behind second-placed Inter Taoyuan that season.

Their efforts were rewarded in 2021, winning the Taiwan Challenge League title by a tight margin, sitting above second-placed Ming Chuan University by just 2 points. With this 35-point campaign, they were successfully promoted without playing the promotion play-offs.

The club was rebranded and modernised as in the club's identity, including a name change. They changed their name from Andy Chen Academy to AC Taipei, on 31 March 2022.

AC Taipei debuted in the 2022 season of Taiwan's top-flight league against Taipower, when they lost 4–1, with Tsai Meng-cheng scoring their lone goal.

AC Taipei's reserve team has yet to win a place at the Taiwan Challenge League, the national football 2nd tier league, for the 2022 season. They played a single-leg qualification match against Kaohsiung F.C. by a draw conducted by the CTFA in 7 May, losing with a score of 0–2. Therefore, they did not secure a spot in the 2022 Challenge League.

On June 13, 2023, the club was renamed to Sunny Bank AC Taipei after receiving sponsorship from Sunny Commercial Bank.

== Current squad ==
=== Men's squad ===
==== First team ====
Note: Flags indicate national team as defined under FIFA eligibility rules; some limited exceptions apply. Players may hold more than one non-FIFA nationality.

No.	Pos.	Nation	Player
1	GK	TPE	Tuan Hsuan
3	DF	TPE	Hsieh Ming-you
4	DF	JPN	Tsuyoshi Kusuyama
6	MF	TPE	Tsai Meng-chen
8	MF	JPN	Jun Uchida
9	FW	TPE	Huang Wei-chieh
12	DF	TPE	Yang Chia-pao
16	MF	TPE	Chen Yan-ruei
17	MF	TPE	Chen Yih-yan
20	GK	TPE	Hsu Cheng-chan
22	FW	TPE	Mu Hsuan-kai
23	MF	GUA	Gustavo Arreaga

No.	Pos.	Nation	Player
25	MF	TPE	Lee Tsung-yang
28	FW	TPE	Hsu Yi-le
29	DF	TPE	Martin Chen
30	DF	TPE	Wang Hsiang-yi
31	GK	JPN	Kenshin Katata
34	DF	JPN	Yamato Kumagai
45	MF	TPE	Wu Tung-hsun
47	MF	TPE	Lien Chia-hsing
48	GK	TPE	Tang Ya-jung
60	MF	TPE	Hayato Takayama
64	DF	TPE	Wu Jia-wei
70	MF	CHI	Matias Godoy

==== Reserves team ====
Note: Flags indicate national team as defined under FIFA eligibility rules; some limited exceptions apply. Players may hold more than one non-FIFA nationality.

No.	Pos.	Nation	Player
18	MF	TPE	Chang Yung-po
22	FW	TPE	Mu Hsuan-kai
24	DF	TPE	Lee Shih-yu
28	FW	TPE	Hsu Yi-le
36	DF	TPE	Liao Mao-lin
37	DF	TPE	Liu Yung-fu
39	DF	TPE	Tsai Meng-tzu
40	FW	TPE	Chen Yu-heng
41	FW	TPE	Li Shih-ying
42	MF	TPE	Chang Chen-jui
46	DF	TPE	Tian Kai-wen
47	MF	TPE	Lien Chia-hsing

No.	Pos.	Nation	Player
50	DF	TPE	Tsai Meng-kuang
52	GK	TPE	Hou Po-yen
53	DF	TPE	Jang Jeh-ming
55	FW	TPE	Yang Hsuan-an^{U19}
57	MF	TPE	Hsieh Fei-hsu^{U19}
60	MF	TPE	Hayato Takayama
61	DF	TPE	Chen Ching-sheng^{U19}
64	DF	TPE	Wu Jia-wei
65	MF	TPE	Huang Chang-tao
66	FW	TPE	Lin Ren-chieh
69	FW	TPE	Liu Chi-chao
70	FW	KOR	Lee Jeong-cheol
77	MF	TPE	Yang Tsan-wu

=== Women's squad ===
Note: Flags indicate national team as defined under FIFA eligibility rules; some limited exceptions apply. Players may hold more than one non-FIFA nationality.

No.	Pos.	Nation	Player
1	GK	TPE	Tsai Ming-jung
2		TPE	Wei Yu-fei
3		TPE	Hsu Tsai-lun
4		TPE	Lai Ssu-cheng
5		TPE	Tseng Yun-ching
6		TPE	Hsu Wei-yun
7		THA	Kanyarat Aikawa (on loan from Phranakorn)
8		TPE	Chiu Wei-yu
9		TPE	Hsu Yi-yun (captain)

No.	Pos.	Nation	Player
10		TPE	Lin Yi-tsen
11		TPE	Hsieh Ya-hsuan
12		THA	Jirakarn Chaimongkhol (on loan from Phranakorn)
13		TPE	Ku Mei-er
16		TPE	Lin Yi-ting
22		TPE	Huang Jou-yu
23		TPE	Chang Tzu-nuo
35		TPE	Chien Hsuan-ying
99	GK	USA	Liz Harrington

== Records ==
- 2022 Taiwan Football Premier League

1st section				2nd section				3rd section			
1	Taipower	4–1	AC Taipei	1	AC Taipei	0–1	Taipower	1	Taipower	2–1	AC Taipei
2	AC Taipei	2–6	Tainan City	2	Tainan City	2–2	AC Taipei	2	AC Taipei	0–7	Tainan City
3	AC Taipei	1–4	Taichung Futuro	3	Taichung Futuro	3–3	AC Taipei	3	AC Taipei	1–2	Taichung Futuro
4	AC Taipei	1–2	Hang Yuen	4	Hang Yuen	3–1	AC Taipei	4	AC Taipei		Hang Yuen
5	Leopard Cat	2–0	AC Taipei	5	AC Taipei	2–2	Leopard Cat	5	Leopard Cat		AC Taipei
6	Ming Chuan	1–2	AC Taipei	6	AC Taipei	1–1	Ming Chuan	6	Ming Chuan		AC Taipei
