= Chinese Taipei national football team =

Chinese Taipei
- Nickname(s): 藍翼, Lányì jūntuán (Blue Wings)
- Association: Chinese Taipei Football Association (CTFA)
- Confederation: AFC (Asia)
- Sub-confederation: EAFF (East Asia)
- Head coach: Matt Ross
- Captain: Chen Po-liang
- Most caps: Chen Po-liang (100)
- Top scorer: Chen Po-liang (25)
- Home stadium: Kaohsiung National Stadium
- FIFA code: TPE
First colours	Second colours

FIFA ranking
- Current: 176 ▼2 (7 October 2026)
- Highest: 121 (April–May 2018)
- Lowest: 191 (June 2016)

First international
- As Republic of China (1912–1949); Philippines 2–1 China (Manila, Philippines; 1 February 1913); As Taiwan / Chinese Taipei (1949–present); Taiwan 3–2 South Vietnam (Manila, Philippines; 1 May 1954)

Biggest win
- Guam 0–10 Chinese Taipei (Taipa, Macau; 17 June 2007)

Biggest defeat
- Kuwait 10–0 Chinese Taipei (Al Ain, United Arab Emirates, 9 November 2006)

Asian Cup
- Appearances: 2 (first in 1960)
- Best result: Third place (1960)

AFC Challenge Cup
- Appearances: 1 (first in 2006)
- Best result: Quarter-finals (2006)

Chinese Taipei national football team
- Traditional Chinese: 中華台北男子足球代表隊
Transcriptions
Standard Mandarin
- Hanyu Pinyin: Zhōnghuá Táiběi Nánzǐ Zúqiú Dàibiǎo Duì
- Wade–Giles: Chung-hua T'ai-pei Nan-tzŭ Tsu-ch'iu Tai-piao Tui

The Chinese Taipei national football team (Chinese: 中華台北男子足球代表隊) represents Taiwan (the Republic of China) in international football and is controlled by the Chinese Taipei Football Association. Despite never qualifying for the FIFA World Cup, Chinese Taipei, then known as Republic of China, reached the semi-finals of the 1960 and 1968 AFC Asian Cups, finishing third in the former. The side also won gold at the 1954 and 1958 Asian Games, although the players in the team originated from British Hong Kong.

== History ==
=== Formation and early success (1954–1970) ===
What is now known as Chinese Taipei Football Association (CTFA) was originally established in mainland China in 1924 as the China Football Association (Chinese: 中華足球聯合會). It joined FIFA in 1931. Following the conclusion of the Chinese Civil War in 1949, the association relocated to Taiwan along with the Republic of China government. On 14 June 1952, FIFA acknowledged that the All-China Sports Federation (Chinese: 中華全國體育總會), which later established Chinese Football Association (Chinese: 中國足球協會) was part of, on People's Republic of China (PRC), not the China Football Association located on Taiwan, was the recognized authority over Chinese Football with their membership dating to 1924. Therefore, all the achievements and records of the ROC team up to 1949 were inherited by the PRC counterpart.

Taiwan was separately admitted as a member of FIFA in June 1954 over the objections of the CFA and the PRC government at the 29th FIFA Congress in Bern. and competed internationally under the names of both "Republic of China" (in AFC and IOC-organized tournaments; Code: ROC) and "Taiwan" (in FIFA-organized tournaments; Code:TAI). Due to this inconsistency, from 1954 to 1978, the national team refused to participate in any FIFA-organized events, like FIFA World Cup and its qualifications, where they couldn't compete under the name of "Republic of China". Only in 1982 did the team fully adopt the name "Chinese Taipei".

The national team achieved its greatest success during this early period. It qualified for the 1960 AFC Asian Cup and finished third, its best performance in the tournament to date. In the same year, the team also participated in the football tournament at the 1960 Summer Olympics. Notably, several players in the squad were originally from Hong Kong, despite Hong Kong having its own national team at the time.

In 1970, an agreement between the CTFA and the Hong Kong Football Association ended the eligibility of Hong Kong-based players to represent Taiwan. The national team's performance declined significantly thereafter, and it has not qualified for the AFC Asian Cup or the FIFA World Cup since.

=== Participation in Oceania Football Confederation (1975–1989) ===
Due to political conflicts with the PRC, Chinese Taipei was expelled from the Asian Football Confederation (AFC) and the Asian Games. As a result, from 1975 to 1989, Chinese Taipei competed as a member of the Oceania Football Confederation (OFC). During this period, the team struggled to achieve significant results on the international stage.

=== Return to AFC and modern developments (1989–present) ===
Chinese Taipei was re-admitted to the AFC in 1989 and to the Olympic Council of Asia in 1990. The national team gradually began rebuilding its international presence but remained a minor footballing nation in Asia.

In recent years, Chinese Taipei experienced a resurgence in form under English coach Gary White, who was appointed in 2017. White implemented modern tactical approaches and launched a global scouting program to identify players of Taiwanese descent abroad. This initiative brought in players such as Tim Chow, Will Donkin, and Emilio Estevez, who contributed to improved performances.

In December 2017, Chinese Taipei hosted and won the CTFA International Tournament, featuring Laos, the Philippines, and Timor-Leste. It marked the national team's first official international trophy in 55 years. Forward Li Mao finished as the tournament's top scorer with four goals.

Under White's leadership, Chinese Taipei won seven consecutive FIFA-recognized matches and advanced to the third round of qualification for the 2019 AFC Asian Cup, narrowly missing qualification by one point behind Bahrain and Turkmenistan. White departed in September 2018 to manage the Hong Kong national team.

After White's departure, the team's performance declined. Interim coach Vom Ca-nhum led the squad in the EAFF E-1 Championship qualifying round, but failed to progress further. In 2019, Louis Lancaster, another English coach and former assistant to White, was appointed head coach. However, the team won only one of nine matches that year and suffered heavy defeats during the early stages of qualification for the 2022 FIFA World Cup. Lancaster was dismissed in December 2019, and replaced by Vom Ca-nhum, who held an AFC Pro A license and was appointed on a permanent basis.

In October 2023, Chinese Taipei competed in the first round of qualification for the 2026 FIFA World Cup. They defeated Timor-Leste 7–0 on aggregate, advancing to the second round, where they were drawn into Group D alongside Oman, Kyrgyzstan, and Malaysia.

== Team image ==
=== Kit ===
As of January 2023, the official kit supplier is local Taiwanese sports brand Entes.

=== Stadium ===
Chinese Taipei played their home matches at the Kaohsiung National Stadium which is able to hold up to 55,000 seating capacity. The stadium, designed by Japanese architect Toyo Ito, makes use of 1 MW of solar cells to provide most of its power needs. The stadium's semi spiral-shaped, like a dragon, is the first stadium in the world to provide power using solar power technology. The solar panels covering the vast external face of the stadium are able to generate most of the power required for its own operation, as well as additional power that can be sent to the grid.

Chinese Taipei used to play their match at the 20,000 capacity stadium Taipei Municipal Stadium which as of now, will be second in line to host the national team matches. On 3 July 2011, the stadium recorded its highest attendance for a football game when Chinese Taipei hosted Malaysia in the first round of the 2014 FIFA World Cup qualification second leg match, when 15,335 spectators attended the game.

== Results and fixtures ==
The following is a list of match results in the last 12 months, as well as any future matches that have been scheduled.

Win Draw Loss Fixture

=== 2026 ===
31 March 2027 AFC Asian Cup Q	Chinese Taipei	1–3	Sri Lanka	Taipei, Taiwan
18:30 UTC+8	Yu Yao-hsing 55'	Report; Report (AFC)	Suresh 18'; Senthurvasan 26'; Tiao 53' (o.g.)	Stadium: Taipei Municipal Stadium; Attendance: 1,556; Referee: Jansen Foo (Singapore)

11 November 2026 Casper Cup	Vietnam	2–0	Chinese Taipei	Ninh Bình, Vietnam
19:00 UTC+7	Olaha Mạnh Đức 21'; Nguyễn Đình Bắc 58'	Report		Stadium: Thiên Trường Stadium; Attendance: 2,148; Referee: Nawal Zubir (Malaysia)

14 November 2026 Casper Cup	Chinese Taipei	0–3	Kyrgyzstan	Ninh Bình, Vietnam
19:00 UTC+7		Report	Zhyrgalbek uulu 31'; Kojo 44'; Akmatov 90+1'	Stadium: Thiên Trường Stadium; Referee: Hoàng Ngọc Hà (Vietnam)

== Coaching staff ==
As of 14 March 2026

Position	Name
Head coach	(Australia) Matt Ross
Assistant coach	(Taiwan) Lin Cheng-yi (England) Graham Harvey
Goalkeeping coach	(Germany) Michael Kraft
Physical coach	(England) Nicholas Punchard

=== Coaching history ===
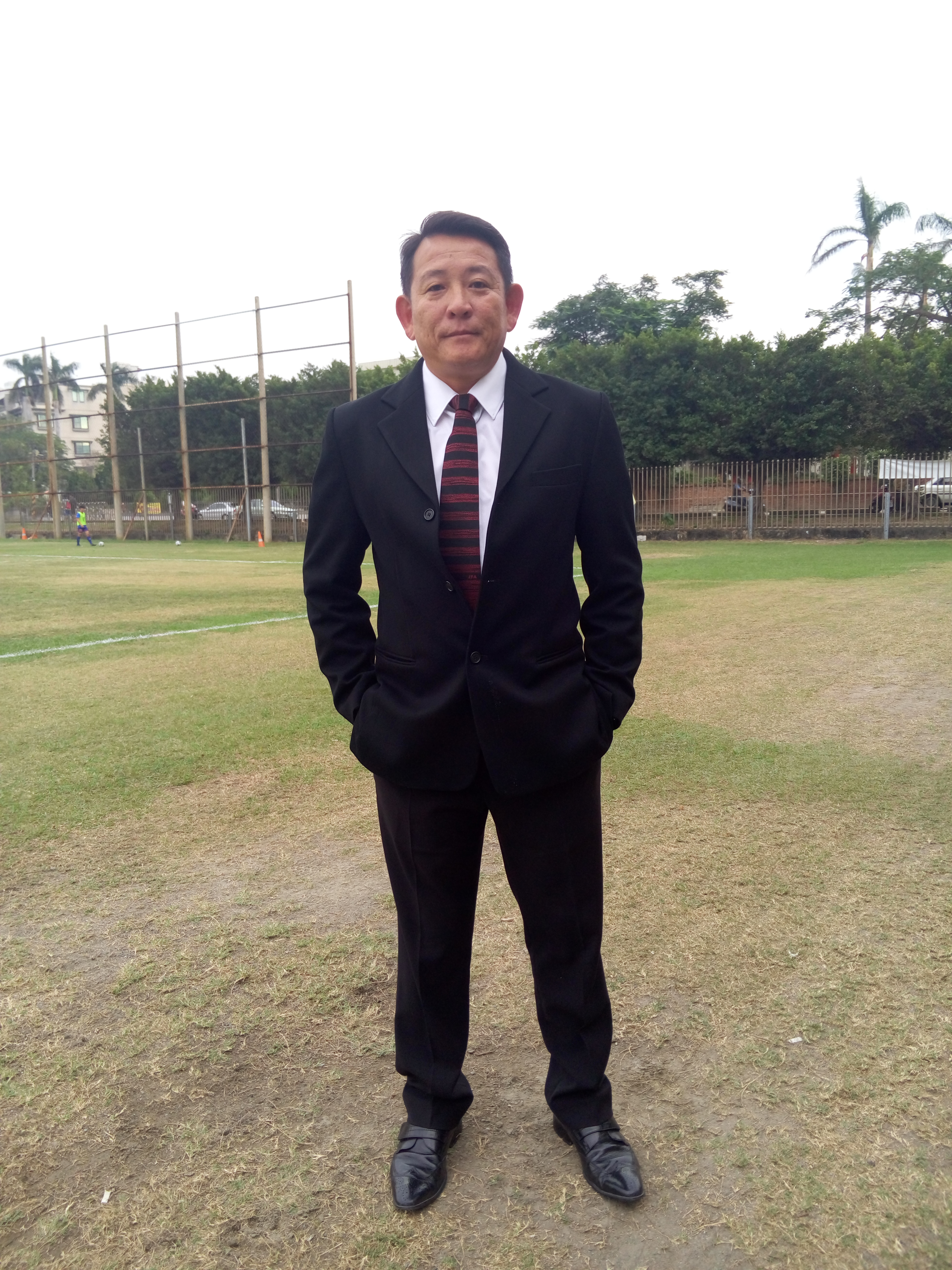
Chen Kuei-jen is a former manager of the Chinese Taipei national football team

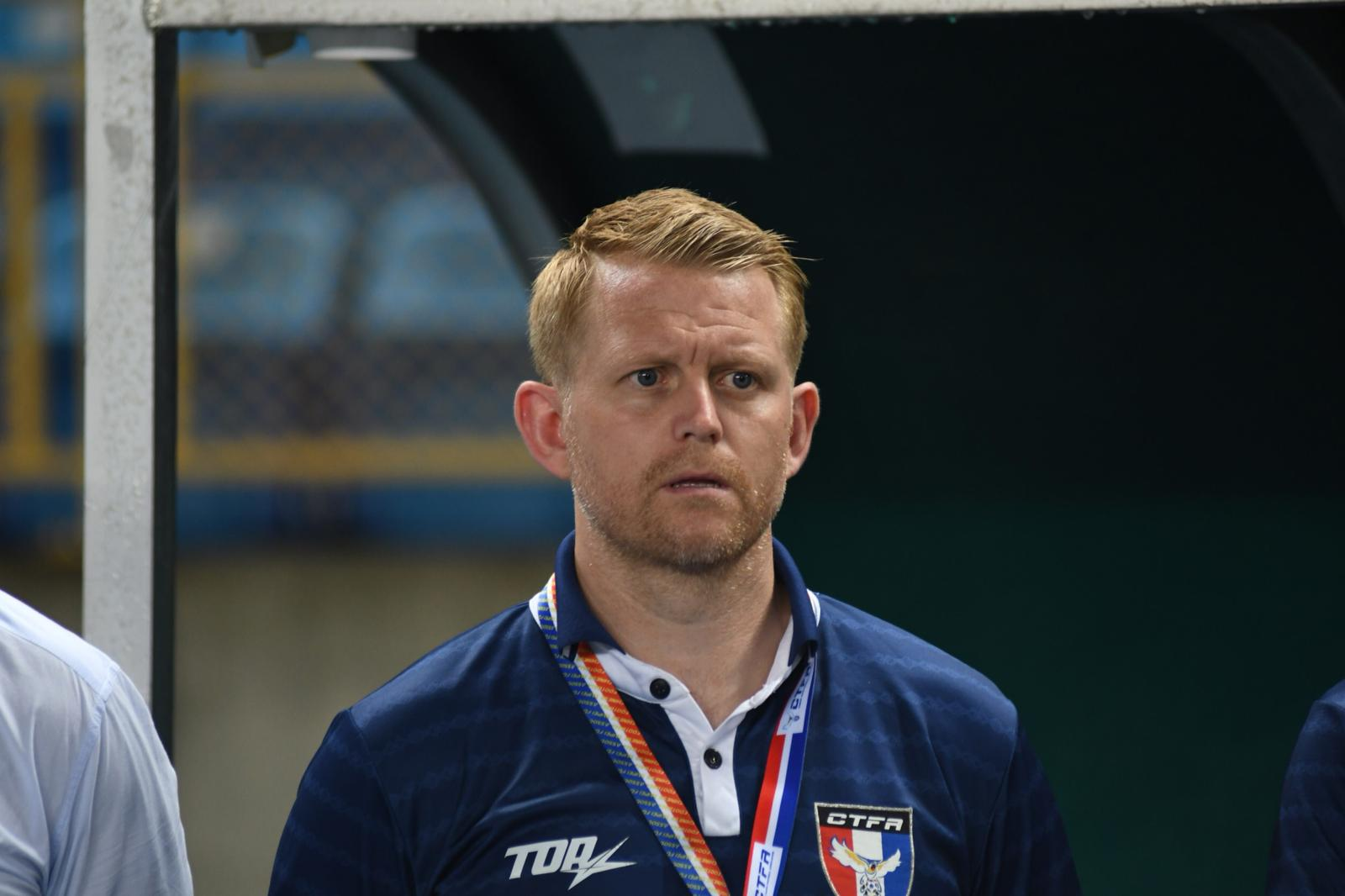
Louis Lancaster became the manager of the Chinese Taipei national football team in 2019

Caretaker managers are listed in italics.

- (Taiwan) (Hong Kong) Ngan Shing-kwan (1936)
- (Taiwan) (Hong Kong) Lee Wai Tong (1954–1958)
- (Taiwan) (Hong Kong) Ho Ying Fun (1966)
- (Taiwan) (Hong Kong) Pau King Yin (1966, 1968, 1971)
- (Taiwan) (Hong Kong) Hsu King Shing (1967)
- (Taiwan) (Hong Kong) Law Pak (1977–1981)
- (Taiwan) Chiang Chia (1981–1985)
- (Taiwan) Lo Chih-tsung (1985–1988)
- (Taiwan) Huang Jen-cheng (1988–1993)
- (Taiwan) Chiang Mu-tsai (1994–2000)
- (Taiwan) Huang Jen-cheng (2000–2001)
- (Taiwan) Lee Po-houng (2001–2005)
- (Brazil) Edson Silva (2005)
- (Japan) Toshiaki Imai (2005–2007)
- (Taiwan) Chen Sing-an (2008–2009)
- (Taiwan) Lo Chih-tsung (2009–2011)
- (South Korea) Lee Tae-ho (2011)
- (Taiwan) Chen Kuei-jen (2012)
- (Taiwan) Chiang Mu-tsai (2012)
- (Taiwan) Chen Kuei-jen (2013–2016)
- (Japan) Toshiaki Imai (2016)
- (Japan) Kazuo Kuroda (2016–2017)
- (Japan) Reiji Hirata (2017)
- (England) Gary White (2017–2018)
- (Taiwan) Vom Ca-nhum (2018)
- (England) Louis Lancaster (2019)
- (Taiwan) Vom Ca-nhum (2020–2021)
- (Taiwan) Yeh Hsien-chung (2021)
- (Taiwan) Yeh Hsien-chung (2022–2023)
- (England) Gary White (2023–2025)
- (Taiwan) Chen Sing-an (2025)
- (Taiwan) Huang Che-ming (2025)
- (Australia) Matt Ross (2025–)

== Players ==
=== Current squad ===
The following 24 players were called up for the 2026 Casper Cup against Vietnam and Kyrgyzstan on 11 and 14 November 2026, respectively.

Caps and goals updated as of 14 November 2026, after the match against Kyrgyzstan.

No.	Pos.	Player	Date of birth (age)	Caps	Goals	Club
1	GK	Huang Chiu-lin	18 June 1997 (age 29)	11	0	(Chinese Taipei Football Association) Taipower
12	GK	Odo Jacobs	18 November 2004 (age 22)	1	0	(Chinese Taipei Football Association) Hang Yuan
22	GK	Tsai Shuo-che	14 January 1996 (age 30)	1	0	Free agent
2	DF	Christopher Tiao	30 May 2001 (age 25)	10	1	(United States Soccer Federation) One Knoxville
5	DF	Wang Yi-you	29 November 1999 (age 26)	1	0	(Chinese Taipei Football Association) Taichung Rock
13	DF	Kuo Po-wei	10 December 1998 (age 27)	7	1	(Chinese Taipei Football Association) Tainan City
16	DF	Huang Chun-lin	6 January 2005 (age 21)	1	0	(Chinese Taipei Football Association) Hang Yuan
21	DF	Martin Baudelet	3 January 2003 (age 23)	8	0	(United States Soccer Federation) Erie Commodores
25	DF	Martin Chen	23 March 2005 (age 21)	2	0	(Chinese Taipei Football Association) AC Taipei
29	DF	Kao Ching-hang	26 November 2005 (age 20)	2	0	(Japan Football Association) Tokai University
4	MF	Tu Shao-chieh	2 January 1999 (age 27)	15	0	(Chinese Taipei Football Association) Taipower
6	MF	Tsai Meng-chen	3 April 1996 (age 30)	7	0	(Chinese Taipei Football Association) AC Taipei
11	MF	Wu Chun-ching	18 December 1988 (age 37)	75	12	(Chinese Taipei Football Association) Tainan City
17	MF	Chen Po-liang (captain)	11 August 1988 (age 38)	100	25	(Chinese Football Association) Jiangxi Dingnan United
18	MF	Lai Yi-chiao	5 July 2007 (age 19)	2	0	(Chinese Taipei Football Association) Taichung Futuro
23	MF	Chen Hong-an	19 April 2009 (age 17)	0	0	(Football Association of Singapore) Lion City Sailors
24	MF	Chang Ssu-yu	14 January 2005 (age 21)	2	0	(Chinese Taipei Football Association) Hang Yuan
7	FW	Chen Hao-wei	30 April 1992 (age 34)	57	8	(Chinese Football Association) Shijiazhuang Gongfu
9	FW	Yu Yao-hsing	12 February 2002 (age 24)	19	7	(Chinese Football Association) Guangxi Hengchen
10	FW	Jhon Benchy	14 June 1994 (age 32)	10	1	(Chinese Taipei Football Association) Kaohsiung Attackers
14	FW	Chang Hsu-yang	29 September 2000 (age 26)	0	0	Free agent
15	FW	Huang Wei-chieh	25 December 2004 (age 21)	12	1	(Chinese Taipei Football Association) AC Taipei
19	FW	Yang Chao-jing	11 August 2005 (age 21)	2	0	(Chinese Taipei Football Association) Taichung Rock
26	FW	Lai Wei	14 April 2002 (age 24)	1	0	(Chinese Taipei Football Association) Taipower

=== Recent call-ups ===
The following players also received a call-up within the last twelve months.

Pos.	Player	Date of birth (age)	Caps	Goals	Club	Latest call-up
GK	Tuan Hsuan	27 October 1997 (age 29)	3	0	(Chinese Taipei) AC Taipei	v. Sri Lanka, 31 March 2026^{PRE}
DF	Jason Hsu	31 December 2002 (age 23)	1	0	(United States) Fordham Rams	v. Sri Lanka, 31 March 2026
DF	Huang Tzu-ming	18 November 2000 (age 26)	14	0	(Chinese Taipei) Taipower	v. Sri Lanka, 31 March 2026
DF	William López	10 September 1993 (age 33)	6	0	(Chinese Taipei) Hang Yuan	v. Sri Lanka, 31 March 2026
DF	Wang Ruei	10 August 1993 (age 33)	25	1	(Chinese Taipei) Tainan City	v. Sri Lanka, 31 March 2026
DF	Chao Wei-chieh	29 April 2003 (age 23)	3	0	(Chinese Taipei) Tatung	v. Sri Lanka, 31 March 2026^{PRE}
DF	Chen Ting-yang	28 September 1992 (age 34)	61	5	(Chinese Taipei) Taichung Futuro	v. Sri Lanka, 31 March 2026^{PRE}
DF	Fong Shao-chi	15 February 2000 (age 26)	16	0	(Chinese Taipei) Tainan City	v. Sri Lanka, 31 March 2026^{PRE}
MF	Emilio Estevez	10 August 1998 (age 28)	19	0	(Hong Kong) Tai Po	v. Sri Lanka, 31 March 2026
MF	Hsu Po-chieh	16 November 2003 (age 23)	2	0	(Chinese Taipei) Taipower	v. Sri Lanka, 31 March 2026
MF	Lin Chen	2 September 2003 (age 23)	2	1	(Chinese Taipei) Taipower	v. Sri Lanka, 31 March 2026
MF	Wu Yen-shu	21 October 1999 (age 27)	16	3	(China) Dalian K'un City	v. Sri Lanka, 31 March 2026
MF	Yao Ko-chi	15 May 1996 (age 30)	8	0	(Chinese Taipei) Tatung Taiwan Leopard Cat	v. Sri Lanka, 31 March 2026^{PRE}
MF	Wei Chih-chuan	3 July 2003 (age 23)	13	0	(Chinese Taipei) Taichung Rock	v. Sri Lanka, 31 March 2026^{PRE}
MF	Chao Ming-hsiu	9 July 1997 (age 29)	10	0	(Chinese Taipei) Taipower	v. Sri Lanka, 31 March 2026^{PRE}
FW	Ange Kouamé	22 December 1996 (age 29)	17	7	(China) Liaoning Tieren	v. Sri Lanka, 31 March 2026
FW	Li Kuan-yi	26 October 2004 (age 22)	1	0	(United States) FHSU	v. Sri Lanka, 31 March 2026

== Player records ==
As of 14 November 2026
Players in bold are still active with Chinese Taipei.

=== Most appearances ===
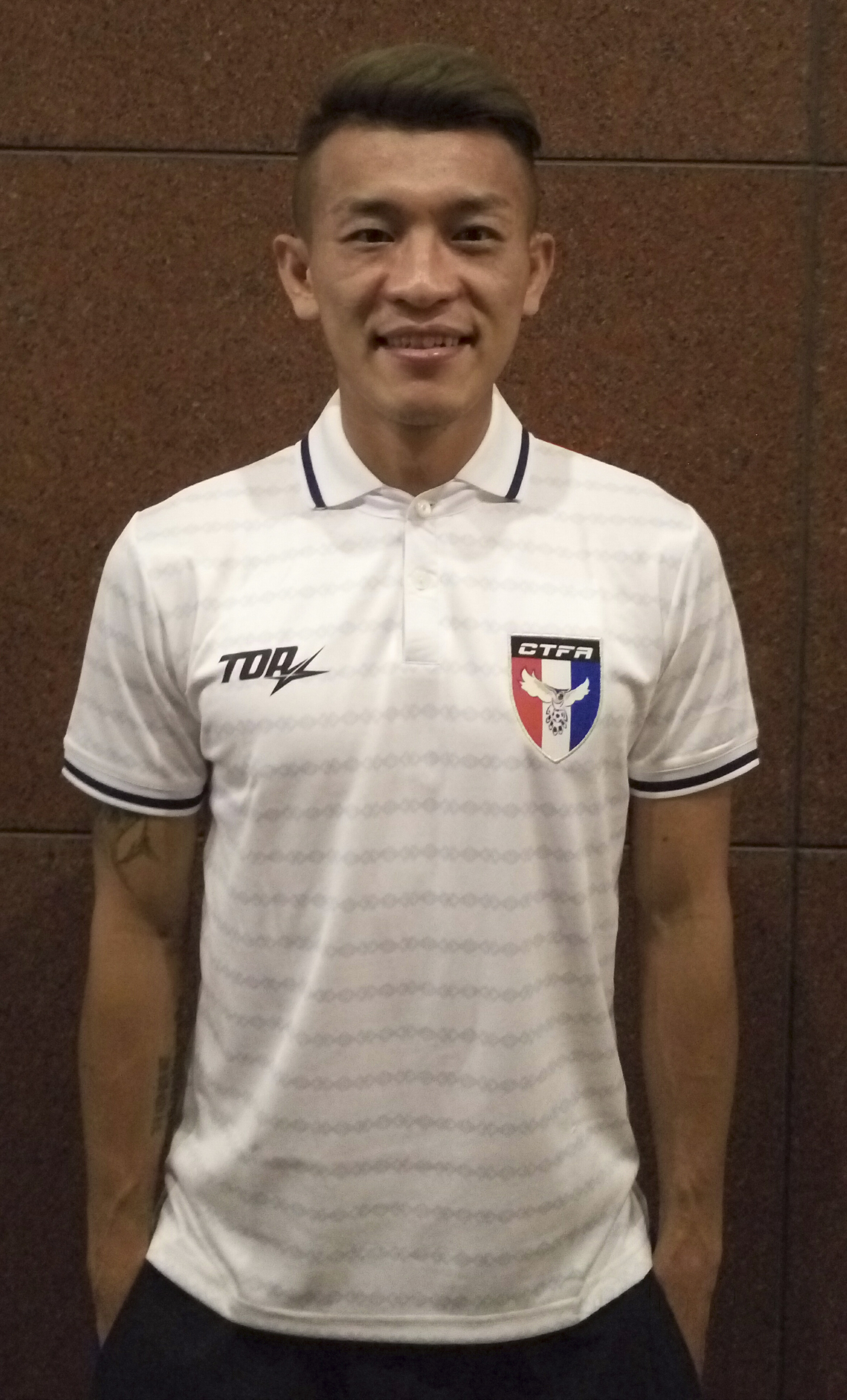
Chen Po-liang is Chinese Taipei's top goalscorer and their most capped player.

Rank	Player	Caps	Goals	Period
1	**Chen Po-liang**	100	25	2006–present
2	**Wu Chun-ching**	75	12	2010–present
3	**Chen Ting-yang**	65	5	2013–present
4	Chen Yi-wei	60	2	2006–2019
5	**Chen Hao-wei**	57	8	2011–present
6	**Wen Chih-hao**	51	4	2012–present
7	**Chen Chao-an**	48	4	2015–present
8	**Pan Wen-chieh**	44	0	2012–present
9	Tsai Hsien-tang	43	2	2000–2012
10	Lin Chang-lun	41	2	2012–2023

=== Top goalscorers ===
Rank	Player	Goals	Caps	Ratio	Period
1	**Chen Po-liang**	25	100	0.25	2006–present
2	**Wu Chun-ching**	12	75	0.16	2010–present
3	Chang Han	10	27	0.37	2008–2012
4	Lo Chih-an	9	37	0.24	2007–2012
4	Lo Chih-en	9	40	0.23	2007–2015
6	Huang Wei-yi	8	18	0.44	2004–2010
6	Yiu Cheuk Yin	8	37	0.22	1954–1964
6	**Chen Hao-wei**	8	57	0.14	2011–present
9	**Ange Kouamé**	7	16	0.44	2023–present
9	**Yu Yao-hsing**	7	19	0.37	2023–present

== Competitive record ==
Champions Runners-up Third place Fourth place

=== FIFA World Cup ===
Chinese Taipei's FIFA World Cup record									Qualification record					
Year	Round	Position	Pld	W	D	L	GF	GA	Pld	W	D	L	GF	GA
(Uruguay) 1930	Not a FIFA member (Note: Territory: Part of Japan / Government: Ruled mainland China only.)								Not a FIFA member					
(Italy) 1934	Not a FIFA member								Not a FIFA member					
(France) 1938	Not a FIFA member								Not a FIFA member					
	as Taiwan													
(Brazil) 1950	Not a FIFA member								Not a FIFA member					
(Switzerland) 1954	Withdrew								Withdrew					
(Sweden) 1958	Withdrew								Withdrew					
(Chile) 1962	Did not enter								Did not enter					
(England) 1966	Did not enter								Did not enter					
(Mexico) 1970	Did not enter								Did not enter					
(West Germany) 1974	Did not enter								Did not enter					
(Argentina) 1978	Did not qualify								4	0	0	4	1	17
	as Chinese Taipei													
(Spain) 1982	Did not qualify								8	1	3	4	5	8
(Mexico) 1986	Did not qualify								6	0	0	6	1	36
(Italy) 1990	Did not qualify								2	0	0	2	1	8
(United States) 1994	Did not qualify								6	0	0	6	3	31
(France) 1998	Did not qualify								6	1	1	4	4	13
(South Korea) (Japan) 2002	Did not qualify								6	0	0	6	0	25
(Germany) 2006	Did not qualify								8	2	0	6	9	27
(South Africa) 2010	Did not qualify								2	0	0	2	0	11
(Brazil) 2014	Did not qualify								2	1	0	1	4	4
(Russia) 2018	Did not qualify								8	1	0	7	7	20
(Qatar) 2022	Did not qualify								8	0	0	8	4	34
(Canada) (Mexico) (United States) 2026	Did not qualify								8	2	0	6	9	17
(Morocco) (Portugal) (Spain) 2030	To be determined								To be determined					
(Saudi Arabia) 2034	To be determined								To be determined					
Total		0/19	0	0	0	0	0	0	74	8	4	62	48	251

=== Olympic Games record ===
Summer Olympics Games record									Qualification record					
Year	Round	Pos	Pld	W	D*	L	GF	GA	Pld	W	D	L	GF	GA
(United Kingdom) 1908	Did not enter								Did not enter					
(Sweden) 1912	Did not enter								Did not enter					
(Belgium) 1920	Did not enter								Did not enter					
(France) 1924	Did not enter								Did not enter					
(Netherlands) 1928	Did not enter								Did not enter					
(Nazi Germany) 1936	Part of China (Note: FIFA recognize result of pre-1949 Republic of China as continuous of China PR history.)								Part of China					
(United Kingdom) 1948	Part of China								Part of China					
(Finland) 1952	Did not enter								Did not enter					
(Australia) 1956	Did not enter								Did not enter					
(Italy) 1960	Group stage	16th	3	0	0	3	3	12	4	3	0	1	9	4
(Japan) 1964	Did not qualify								2	1	0	1	2	2
(Mexico) 1968	Did not qualify								5	1	0	4	11	18
(West Germany) 1972	Did not qualify								4	0	0	4	1	19
(Canada) 1976	Did not qualify								2	0	0	2	0	5
(Soviet Union) 1980	Refused to participate								Refused to participate					
(United States) 1984	Did not qualify								6	0	4	2	5	9
(South Korea) 1988	Did not qualify								9	1	0	8	8	29
1992–present	See Chinese Taipei national under-23 team													
Total	Group stage	1/17	3	0	0	3	3	12	32	6	4	22	36	86

=== AFC Asian Cup ===
Chinese Taipei's AFC Asian Cup record									Qualification record					
Year	Round	Position	Pld	W	D	L	GF	GA	Pld	W	D	L	GF	GA
	as Republic of China													
(Hong Kong) 1956	Did not qualify								2	0	0	2	1	4
(South Korea) 1960	Third place	3rd	3	1	0	2	2	2	2	2	0	0	14	8
1964	Withdrew								Withdrew					
(Iran) 1968	Fourth place	4th	4	0	2	2	3	10	4	3	1	0	15	4
1972	Withdrew								Withdrew					
(Iran) 1976	Expelled								Expelled					
	as Chinese Taipei													
1980	OFC member								OFC member					
(Singapore) 1984	OFC member								OFC member					
1988	OFC member								OFC member					
(Japan) 1992	Did not qualify								3	0	1	2	0	8
(United Arab Emirates) 1996	Did not qualify								3	1	0	2	10	10
(Lebanon) 2000	Did not qualify								6	1	0	5	3	11
(China) 2004	Did not qualify								2	1	0	1	4	2
(Indonesia) (Malaysia) (Thailand) (Vietnam) 2007	Did not qualify								6	0	0	6	0	24
(Qatar) 2011	Did not qualify								AFC Challenge Cup					
(Australia) 2015	Did not qualify								AFC Challenge Cup					
(United Arab Emirates) 2019	Did not qualify								18	6	1	11	20	38
(Qatar) 2023	Did not qualify								10	0	0	10	5	39
(Saudi Arabia) 2027	Did not qualify								14	2	0	12	14	36
Total	Third place	2/18	7	1	2	4	5	12	70	16	3	51	86	184

=== AFC Challenge Cup ===
AFC Challenge Cup record									Qualification record					
Year	Result	Position	Pld	W	D*	L	GF	GA	Pld	W	D	L	GF	GA
(Bangladesh) 2006	Quarter-finals	8th	4	1	2	1	3	5	No qualification					
(India) 2008	Did not qualify								3	1	1	1	7	5
(Sri Lanka) 2010	Did not qualify								3	1	1	1	7	3
(Nepal) 2012	Did not qualify								5	1	1	3	6	10
(Maldives) 2014	Did not qualify								3	0	1	2	2	6
Total	Quarter-finals	1/5	4	1	2	1	3	5	14	3	4	7	22	24

=== East Asian Cup ===
EAFF East Asian Cup record									Preliminary round					
Year	Result	Position	Pld	W	D	L	GF	GA	Pld	W	D	L	GF	GA
(Japan) 2003	Did not qualify								4	3	0	1	13	3
(South Korea) 2005	Did not qualify								4	1	1	2	9	7
(China) 2008	Did not qualify								3	2	1	0	18	3
(Japan) 2010	Did not qualify								3	1	0	2	5	8
(South Korea) 2013	Did not qualify								4	0	1	3	2	17
(China) 2015	Did not qualify								3	0	1	2	1	3
(Japan) 2017	Did not qualify								6	4	0	2	17	9
(South Korea) 2019	Did not qualify								3	1	0	2	3	5
(Japan) 2022	Did not participate								Not held					
(South Korea) 2025	Did not qualify								2	1	0	1	5	2
Total	—	0/9	–	–	–	–	–	–	32	13	4	15	73	57

=== Asian Games ===
Asian Games record
Year	Position	Pld	W	D	L	GF	GA
(India) 1951	Did not enter						
(Philippines) 1954	Champions	4	4	0	0	16	6
(Japan) 1958	Champions	5	5	0	0	11	4
(Indonesia) 1962	Withdrew (visas refused)						
(Thailand) 1966	Group stage	3	0	1	2	5	8
(Thailand) 1970	Did not enter						
1974–1986	Expelled from Asian Games						
1990–1998	Did not enter						
See Chinese Taipei U23
Total	3/13	12	9	1	2	32	18

== Honours ==
=== Continental ===
- AFC Asian Cup
  - (bronze) Third place (1): 1960
- Asian Games^{1}
  - (gold) Gold medal (2): 1954, 1958

=== Friendly ===
- CTFA International Tournament (1): 2017

=== Summary ===
Only official honours are included, according to FIFA statutes (competitions organized/recognized by FIFA or an affiliated confederation).

Competition	1st place, gold medalist(s)	2nd place, silver medalist(s)	3rd place, bronze medalist(s)	Total
AFC Asian Cup	0	0	1	1
Total	0	0	1	1

Notes

1. Competition organized by OCA, officially not recognized by FIFA.

== See also ==
- List of Taiwanese footballers
- Chinese Taipei national futsal team
- Chinese Taipei women's national football team
