= Chen Kuei-jen =

Taiwanese footballer and manager

Chen Kuei-jen 陳貴人
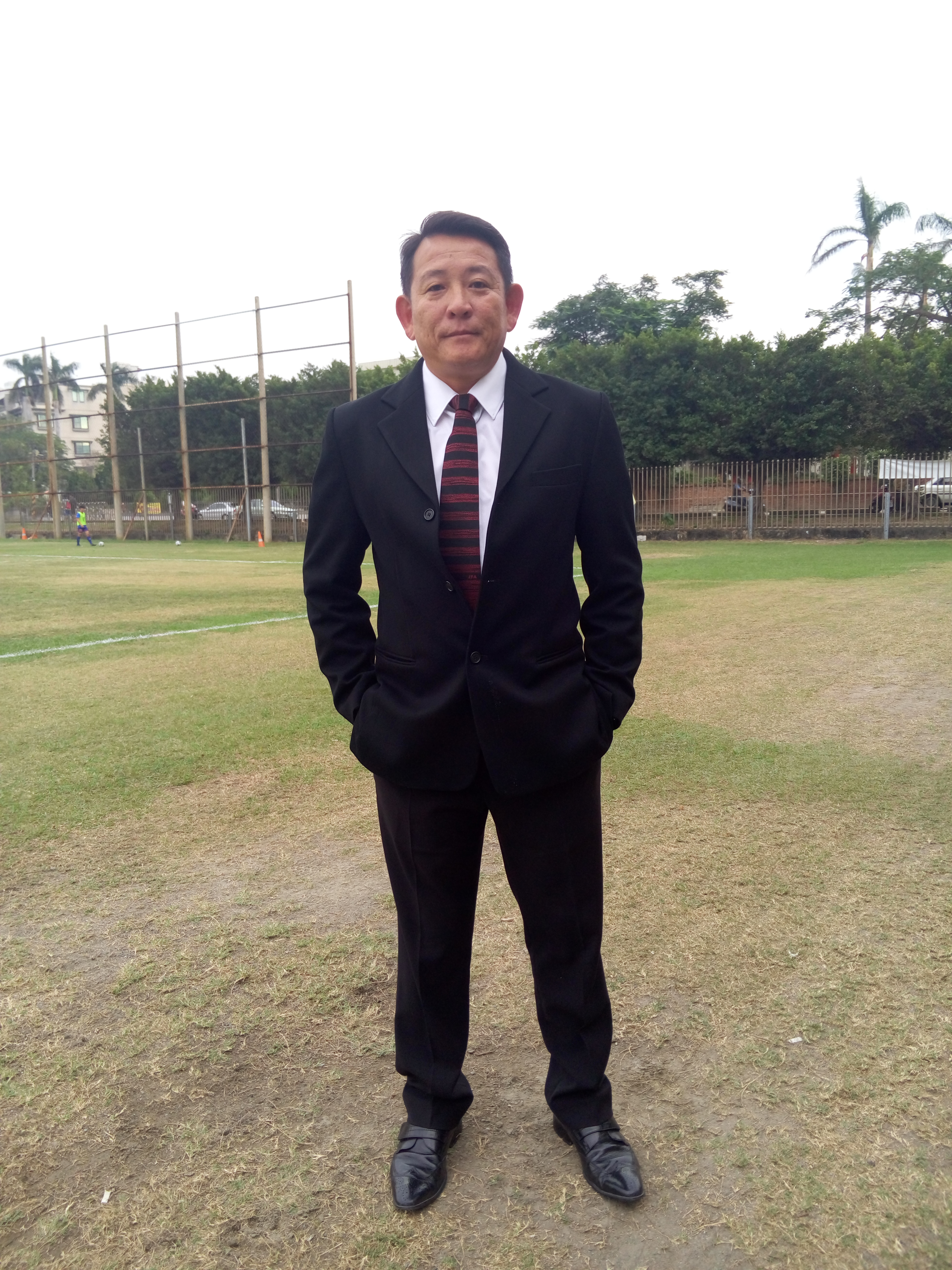

Personal information
- Date of birth: 6 July 1968 (age 58)
- Place of birth: Taiwan

Senior career*
Years	Team	Apps	(Gls)
- Taipei City Bank
- Taiwan Power Company

International career
1993–2000	Chinese Taipei	11	(1)

Managerial career
- 2004–: Taiwan Power Company
- 2005: Chinese Taipei (assistant)
- 2012: Chinese Taipei (caretaker)
- 2013–2016: Chinese Taipei
- * Club domestic league appearances and goals

Chen Kuei-jen (Chinese: 陳貴人; pinyin: Chén Guìrén; born 6 July 1968) is a Taiwanese football manager and former player. He is the manager of Taiwan Power Company F.C. He has been assistant coach to Dido and Lee Po-hung in Chinese Taipei national football team.

== Managerial history ==
- Taiwan Power Company F.C., ?-present
- Chinese Taipei national football team (assistant coach), 2005
- Chinese Taipei national futsal team, 2006-2007
