= Louis Lancaster =

English football coach (born 1981)

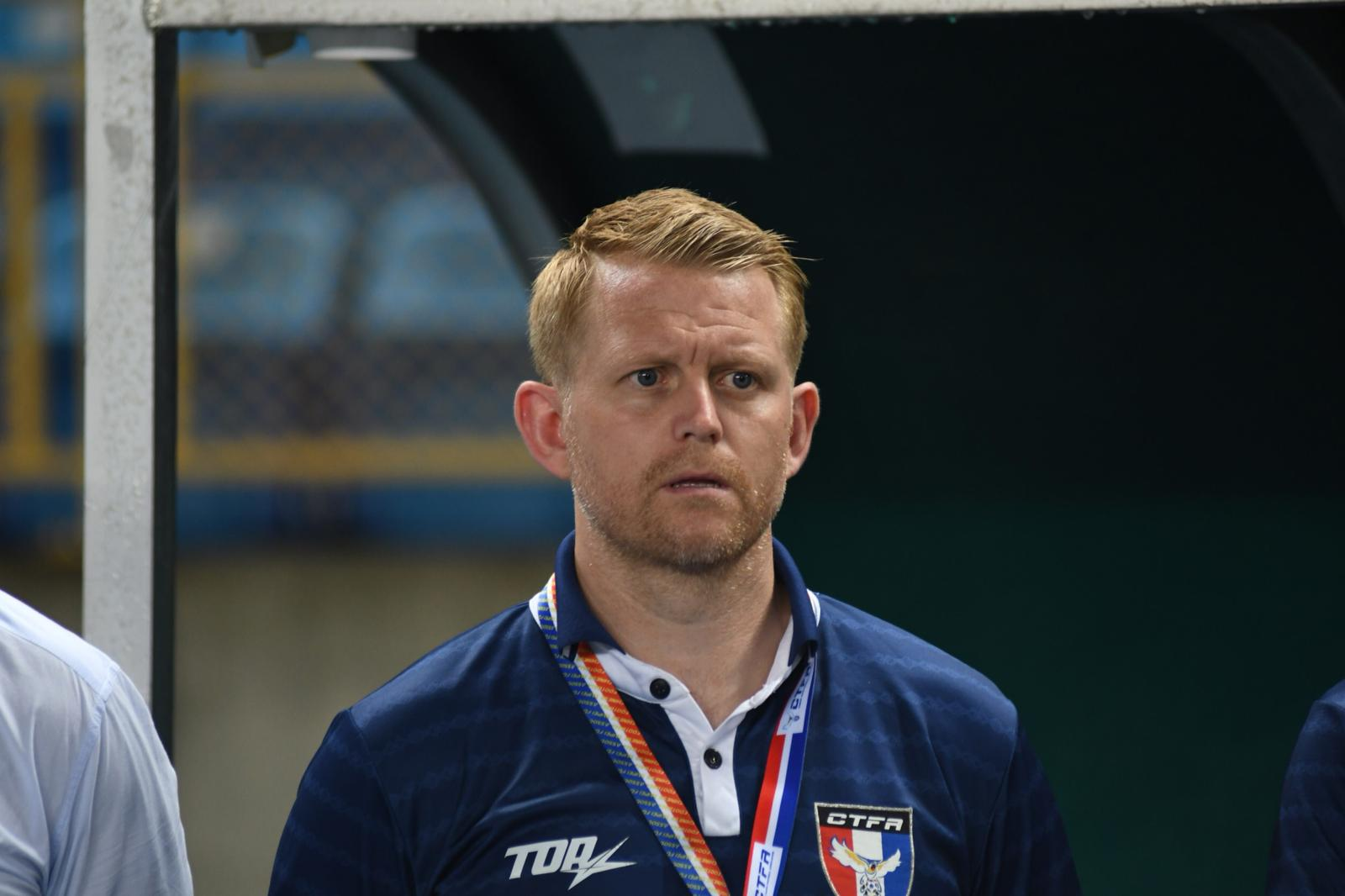

Personal information
- Full name: Louis Alan Lancaster
- Date of birth: 9 October 1981 (age 45)
- Place of birth: Barking, England

Senior career*
Years	Team	Apps	(Gls)
- Wealdstone
- Hertford Town
- Berkhamsted
2014	Welwyn Garden City	1	(0)

Managerial career
- 2012: Brentford U18
- 2016: Shanghai Shenxin (assistant)
- 2017–2019: Chinese Taipei (assistant)
- 2019: Chinese Taipei
- 2020: Utah Royals (assistant)
- * Club domestic league appearances and goals

Louis Lancaster (born 9 October 1981) is an English professional football coach, notable for his role as head coach of Chinese Taipei national football team and coaching Jadon Sancho.

== Early life ==
Born in Barking, Lancaster was raised in Hatfield in Hertfordshire. During his youth he had stints at professional academies however failed to secure a contract. Lancaster played semi-professional football for Welwyn Garden City, Hertford Town, Berkhamsted and Wealdstone.

== Managerial career ==
Lancaster holds a UEFA Pro License and an Elite Coaching License. He has held coaching positions at Portsmouth and Brentford. He also worked with future England international Jadon Sancho during his time at Watford, where he spent three seasons.

In 2011, Lancaster was selected as one of 16 coaches from the past decade to participate in the inaugural FA Elite Coaches Award delivered by Dick Bate and Alistair Smith. He went on to complete his UEFA Pro Licence in 2013 where he also completed an in-depth study on the topic of mavericks. It was on this course he met Gary White. Lancaster assisted White at Shanghai Shenxin in China League One and with the Chinese Taipei national football team. In their time with the National Team, they reached the nation's highest ever FIFA ranking and won their first title in 49 years.

=== Chinese Taipei national team ===
Lancaster was appointed the head coach of the Chinese Taipei national team on 18 January 2019, his first senior management position.

Lancaster secured his first win charge on 11 June 2019, when Taiwan defeated Hong Kong 0–2, with both goals scored by Chen Hao-wei. He was sacked in December 2019.

=== Utah Royals ===
On 18 February 2020, Utah Royals announced that Lancaster had joined as an assistant. Lancaster's time in Utah came to an end in December 2020 when it was announced that the Royals would cease operations and their player-related assets transferred to the expansion Kansas City NWSL team.

== Career statistics ==
Appearances and goals by club, season and competition
Club	Season	League			FA Cup		Other		Total	
Club	Season	Division	Apps	Goals	Apps	Goals	Apps	Goals	Apps	Goals
Welwyn Garden City	2004–05	Spartan South Midlands League Premier Division	3	3	0	0	0	0	3	3
Hatfield Town	2005–06	Hertfordshire Senior County League Premier Division	2	1	0	0	0	0	2	1
Hertford Town	2007–08	Spartan South Midlands League Premier Division	16	0	3	0	6 (Note: 2 appearances in Spartan South Midlands League Challenge Trophy 2 appearances in Spartan South Midlands League Premier Division Cup, 1 appearance in Herts Senior Cup, 1 appearance in Herts Charity Cup)	0	25	0
Welwyn Garden City	2013–14	Spartan South Midlands League First Division	1	0	0	0	0	0	1	0
Career total			22	4	3	0	6	0	31	4
