= Kazuo Kuroda =

Japanese football manager (born 1949)

Kazuo Kuroda (Japanese: 黒田和生; born 8 March 1949) is a Japanese former football manager and player who last managed Chinese Taipei.

== Career ==
Kuroda has been regarded as an important youth manager in Japan and managed the Chinese Taipei national football team.
