= Huang Jen-cheng =

Taiwanese footballer and manager

Personal information
- Date of birth: 1960 (age 65–66)
- Place of birth: Taiwan

College career
Years	Team	Apps	(Gls)
- Taiwan Provincial College of Physical Education

Senior career*
Years	Team	Apps	(Gls)
- Lu Kuang
–1991	Taiwan Power Company		

Managerial career
- 1991–2004: Taiwan Power Company
- 1988–1993: Chinese Taipei
- 2000–2001: Chinese Taipei
- * Club domestic league appearances and goals

Huang Jen-cheng (Chinese: 黃仁成; pinyin: Huáng Rénchéng; born 1960) is a Taiwanese former football player and manager.

== Club career ==
Huang attended Loyu Vocational High School and the Taiwan Provincial College of Physical Education. During his compulsory military service, he played for the Lu Kuang football team. After completing his military service, he was recruited by Chung Mao-chu to join Taiwan Power Company, serving as team captain starting in 1987 before transitioning to head coach in 1991.

== International career ==
At the international level, Huang was selected for the under-15 national team in 1975 to compete in an international secondary school invitational tournament, though the team ultimately did not make the trip. He was called up again in 1982, but missed out due to administrative delays with his paperwork. Following his performance in the 1987 Jin Feng Cup, he finally made his debut for the national team in the 1988 Olympic qualifiers.

== Managerial career ==
As manager, Huang is the most successful coach in Taiwan, having led Taiwan Power Company to eleven National Men's First Division Football League titles, including their first in 1993 and nine consecutive championships starting in 1995. He stepped down from his managerial role in 2004 due to physical health issues.
