= Matt Ross (soccer coach) =

Australian soccer manager (born 1978)

Personal information
- Full name: Matthew Barry Ross
- Date of birth: 4 January 1978 (age 48)
- Place of birth: Newcastle, New South Wales, Australia

Managerial career
- Years: Team
- 2013–2015: 1. FFC Frankfurt (women)
- 2015–2017: 1. FFC Frankfurt (women)
- 2018: Vittsjö GIK (women)
- 2018–2019: China U15 (women)
- 2019–2023: South Korea (women; assistant)
- 2023–2024: Al Qadsiah U19
- 2024–2025: Dubai United (assistant)
- 2025: Nepal
- 2025–: Chinese Taipei

Matthew Barry Ross (born 4 January 1978) is an Australian football manager who is the head coach of the Chinese Taipei national team.

== Career ==
Ross was appointed as U17 Head Coach of German women's side 1. FFC Frankfurt in 2013, winning the U17 Bundesliga South. He was also first team analyst when the club beat Paris Saint-Germain 2–1 to win the 2015 UEFA Women's Champions' League in Berlin. He was promoted to the club's first team manager in December 2015 and led the team to the UEFA Women's Champions' League Semi-Finals in 2016, losing 4–1 to VfL Wolfsburg over two legs. In 2018, he was appointed manager of Swedish women's side Vittsjö GIK before being appointed manager of the China women's national under-15 football team the same year.

One year later, he was appointed as an Assistant Manager of the South Korea women's national football team. The team reached the final of the 2022 AFC Asian Cup in India, losing 3–2 to China. His last match with the Korean team was a memorable 1–1 draw with Germany at the 2023 FIFA Women's World Cup in Brisbane.

Subsequently, he moved into men's football and was appointed as U19 Head Coach of Saudi Arabian side Al Qadsiah in 2023. The next season he was appointed Assistant Manager of Emirati side United. Following his stint there, he was appointed manager of the Nepal national team in 2025. His first match was an historic 1–0 victory away to Singapore which was followed by a 0–2 loss to Malaysia. This result was later overturned to a 3–0 victory by the AFC due to Malaysia fielding 7 ineligible players. During his tenure he solidified Nepal's defensive structure with four clean sheets in seven matches. He also transformed the team into a more progressive, possession-based and counter-pressing side.

Ross resigned from the position in the midst of the 2025 Nepal Revolution and accepted the Chinese Taipei manager's position in October 2025. On January 1 he was appointed Technical Director, overseeing the national football program.

Ross holds a UEFA Pro Licence from the Football Association of Ireland.

== Personal life ==
Ross was born on 4 January 1978 in Newcastle, Australia and is a native of Newcastle, Australia. Growing up, he attended Merewether High School in Australia and then the University of Newcastle in Australia, where he studied Social Science, Education and Applied Science (Sports Coaching) . Eventually, he married South Korean Australian woman Kyung Soon Kim.
