= Syrus Connolly =

Cayman Islands footballer

Personal information
- Date of birth: 21 June 2003 (age 23)
- Place of birth: George Town, Cayman Islands
- Height: 1.90 m (6 ft 3 in)
- Position: Forward

Team information
- Current team: Erie Commodores
- Number: 21

Youth career
- –2022: Academy SC

College career
Years	Team	Apps	(Gls)
2022–2023	CCC Raiders	28	(16)
2024	Concord Mountain Lions	21	(12)
2025	Longwood Lancers	15	(4)

Senior career*
Years	Team	Apps	(Gls)
2025	Toledo Villa	6	(0)
2026	Erie Commodores	9	(1)

International career^{‡}
2022–	Cayman Islands	4	(1)
- * Club domestic league appearances and goals as of 16:57, 29 September 2026 (UTC) ‡ National team caps and goals as of 13:10, 13 October 2025 (UTC)

Syrus Connolly (born 21 June 2003) is a Cayman Islands association footballer who plays for NPSL club Erie Commodores and the Cayman Islands national team.

== Club career ==
As a youth, Connolly played for the junior teams of Cayman Islands Premier League club Academy SC. He then began playing college soccer in the United States for two seasons with the CCC Raiders and one with the Concord Mountain Lions. Following the 2025 season, it was announced that Connolly had transferred to NCAA Division I school Virginia Tech to play for the Hokies for his senior season. After just one semester at Virginia Tech, he transferred to nearby Longwood University, joining its Lancers soccer team, also of the NCAA Division I.

Connolly joined Toledo Villa FC of the USL League Two for the 2025 season. In summer 2026, he signed for Erie Commodores FC of the National Premier Soccer League. He scored the game-tying goal in an eventual 4–3 victory over Cleveland SC on 27 June.

== International career ==
Connolly made his senior international debut on 3 June 2022 in a 2022–23 CONCACAF Nations League C match against the British Virgin Islands. He scored his first senior international goal in the match, tallying almost immediately after entering as a second-half substitute, to help the Cayman Islands secure the 1–1 draw.

=== International goals ===
Scores and results list the Cayman Islands' goal tally first.

No.	Date	Venue	Opponent	Score	Result	Competition
1	3 June 2022	A. O. Shirley Recreation Ground, George Town, Cayman Islands	British Virgin Islands	1–1	1–1	2022–23 CONCACAF Nations League C
Last updated 7 July 2025

=== International career statistics ===
As of match played 26 March 2024.

Cayman Islands national team
2022	3	1
2024	1	0
Total	4	1
