= Yeh Hsien-chung =

Taiwanese footballer and futsal player

Personal information
- Full name: Yeh Hsien-chung (葉獻中)
- Date of birth: 1 July 1979 (age 47)
- Place of birth: Taiwan
- Height: 1.78 m (5 ft 10 in)
- Position: Goalkeeper

Youth career
- Hsin Feng SHS

Senior career*
Years	Team	Apps	(Gls)
2002–2005	Taipei PE College		
2006	Tatung		

International career
2001–2002	Chinese Taipei futsal		
2004	Chinese Taipei U-23		
2009–2010	Chinese Taipei	1	(0)

Managerial career
- 2021: Chinese Taipei (caretaker)
- 2022-2023: Chinese Taipei (head coach)
- 2023: Chinese Taipei (assistant)
- * Club domestic league appearances and goals

Yeh Hsien-chung (Chinese: 葉獻中; born on 1 July 1979) is a Taiwanese football professional coach and former futsal goalkeeper who is the assistant coach of Chinese Taipei. Nicknamed Red Dragon (Chinese: 紅中), he is better known as his performance in futsal games. He has represented Chinese Taipei in the 2004 Summer Olympics and AFC Futsal Championships. He has also been member of Tatung F.C. squad in AFC President's Cup 2006.

In 2009, Yeh became Chinese Taipei's goalkeeping coach. However, in the 2010 East Asian Football Championship, Yeh participated as a player in Chinese Taipei squad. He made his senior team debut in the game against Guam, in which Chinese Taipei won 4–2, on 25 August 2009.
