= Martin Baudelet =

Taiwanese footballer (born 2003)

Personal information
- Date of birth: 3 January 2003 (age 23)
- Place of birth: Saint-Germain-en-Laye, France
- Height: 1.89 m (6 ft 2 in)
- Position: Centre-back

Team information
- Current team: Erie Commodores
- Number: 6

Youth career
- –2021: FC Versailles 78

College career
Years	Team	Apps	(Gls)
2021–2025	McGill Redbirds	25	(0)

Senior career*
Years	Team	Apps	(Gls)
2024	CS St-Hubert		
2025	Eastern District	0	(0)
2025–2026	Rot Weiss Ahlen	1	(0)
2026–	Erie Commodores	9	(0)

International career^{‡}
2024–	Chinese Taipei	7	(0)
- * Club domestic league appearances and goals ‡ National team caps and goals as of 13 November 2026

Martin Baudelet (Chinese: 簡柏庭; born 3 January 2003) is a professional footballer who plays as a centre-back for Erie Commodores FC of the NPSL. Born in France, he plays for the Chinese Taipei national team.

== Early life ==
Baudelet was born on 3 January 2003 in Saint-Germain-en-Laye, France, and was of Taiwanese descent through his mother. His grandparents live in Taipei, Taiwan.

== College career ==
As a youth player, Baudelet joined the youth academy of French side FC Versailles 78. In 2021, he started attending McGill University in Canada, where he played for their soccer team and made twenty-five appearances. While playing for them, he played in the local semi-professional league, the Ligue1 Québec, with CS St-Hubert.

== Club career ==
On 20 August 2025, Baudelet joined Hong Kong Premier League club Eastern District. The following month, he moved to Rot Weiss Ahlen of Germany's Oberliga Westfalen.

== International career ==
Baudelet is a Chinese Taipei international.

On 11 October 2024, Baudelet debuted for Chinese Taipei during a 3–2 away friendly win over Cambodia.

In December 2024, Baudelet played for Chinese Taipei at the EAFF E-1 Football Championship.

In 2025, Baudelet played for Chinese Taipei in the 2027 AFC Asian Cup qualification matches.
