= Gary White (footballer) =

English footballer and coach

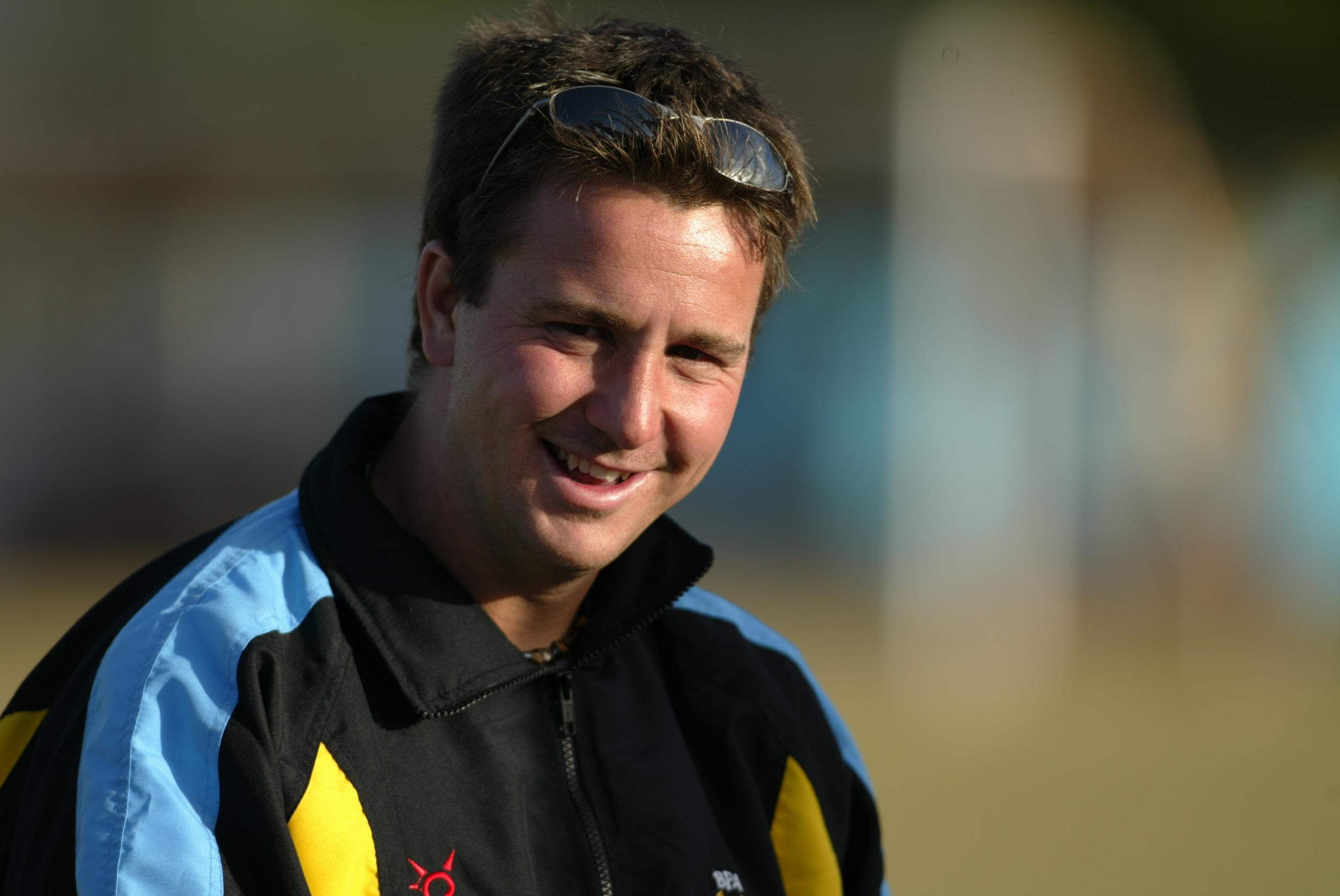

Personal information
- Full name: Gary John White
- Date of birth: 25 July 1974 (age 52)
- Place of birth: Southampton, England
- Position: Winger

Youth career
- 1986–1990: Southampton

Senior career*
Years	Team	Apps	(Gls)
1990–1994	Bognor Regis Town	28	(8)
1994–1996	Fremantle City	45	(13)
Total		73	(21)

Managerial career
- 1998–1999: British Virgin Islands
- 1999–2008: Bahamas
- 2012–2016: Guam
- 2016: Shanghai Shenxin
- 2017–2018: Chinese Taipei
- 2018: Hong Kong
- 2019: Tokyo Verdy
- 2019–2020: Nantong Zhiyun
- 2020–2023: Suzhou Dongwu
- 2023-2025: Chinese Taipei
- * Club domestic league appearances and goals

Gary John White (born 25 July 1974) is an English UEFA pro license football coach and former professional player, who has coached six (6) National Teams and various professional clubs around the world. Professional clubs include Asian powerhouses Tokyo Verdy of the J. League & Shanghai Shenxin F.C. previously of the Chinese Super League. He has coached in four (4) FIFA World Cup campaigns 2002,2006,2018 & 2026. Each National team reached there highest FIFA ranking under his leadership. He is currently Director of Football Development for Nike, Inc. GC.

== Early life ==
White was born in Southampton, England, and had a successful youth playing career. He was selected for both the Southampton City and Hampshire County representative teams and was a future prospect for Southampton FC.

== Playing career ==
White signed for Fremantle City Soccer Club in the Western Australia State League in 1994, where he played two seasons for the club. Prior to signing for the Australian outfit, White played for Bognor Regis Town.

== Managerial career ==
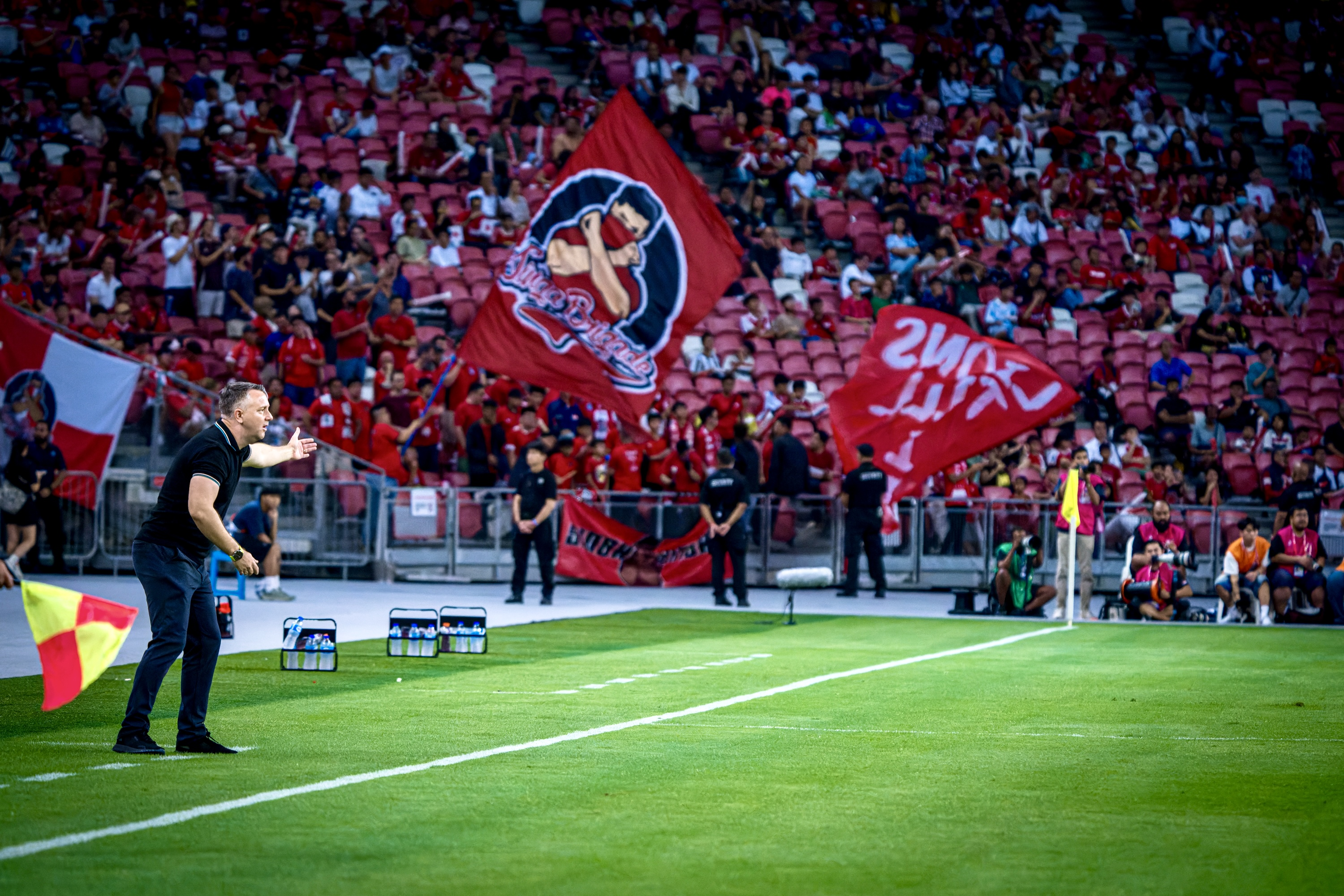
Gary White Coaching On The Sidelines During FIFA International Game

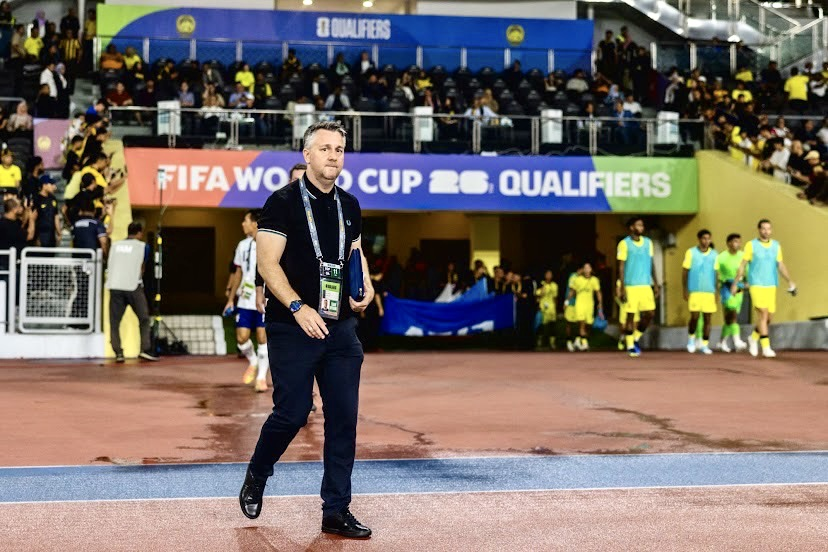
Gary White Enters 2026 FIFA World Cup Clash

=== British Virgin Islands ===
White was the national technical director and national team head coach for the British Virgin Islands, where he had success during the 2000 CONCACAF Gold Cup qualification which resulted in the national team shooting up the FIFA world rankings 28 places. At age 24 White is still one of the youngest ever national team head coaches in FIFA competition history.

=== Bahamas ===
White signed with the Bahamas in September 1999, where he served as the mens national team head coach and the BFA's technical director. During his tenure with the Bahamas, White moved the national team 55 places up the FIFA world ranking. Also as technical director White directed and oversaw all national team programmes and national staff coaches in preparation for all FIFA and CONCACAF Competitions, The role also included directing coach education for the national federation. White also designed and implemented a national coaching philosophy as part of the international teams and player development strategy.

White coached and managed more than 65 FIFA international 'A' matches during his tenure and was rewarded as the highest moving coach in FIFA's world rankings in 2006.

In 2007 White took the position of technical director of the Snohomish United youth soccer organization. In 2009, he left for the Seattle Sounders FC elite player development program.

=== Washington State Soccer and Seattle Sounders FC (EPD) Technical Director ===
During his time in Seattle, White lead the daily technical operations for the Sounders FC Elite Player Development Program and Washington States coaching education initiatives. During White's time in Seattle the Washington State / Sounders FC Elite Player Development Program became a powerhouse in the nation on and off the field and lead the country with their modern player & coaching development initiatives which, in the end, forced US Youth Soccers ODP (Olympic Development Program) to modernise and become more elite. During White's tenure the Washington State / Sounders FC EPD program won eight US Youth Soccer Championships in two years, these were the first championships that Washington had won in over 15 barren years and made the program California South's biggest rival in the country. White was named in the US Soccer Task Force for national player development along with such names as MiaHamm and Claudio Reyna. During Whites tenure at Seattle Sounders FC various top players were developed and went on to play in the MLS , European pro leagues including the EPL these include deAndre Yedlinand jordan Morris

=== Guam ===
On 1 February 2012, White was appointed as head coach of Guam and whilst also serving as the federation's technical director.

The Guam national team shocked the world under White most notably in June 2015 when after two games of the 2018 FIFA World Cup qualifiers they lead group D. The group included world heavy weights Iran and regionally strong outfits Oman, India and Turkmenistan. Guam with White as the coach comfortably beat both India and Turkmenistan and tied with Oman. Guam reached their best ever FIFA ranking under White's management with a remarkable increase of 50+ places.

Due to the success of the Matao, FIFA Futbol Mundial, in episode 137, and various other world media have featured White and the progress of the Guam national football team.

=== Shanghai Shenxin ===
On 30 May 2016, White was appointed as head coach of Shanghai Shenxin in the China League One, with the side facing a relegation battle. White successfully guided them to safety and a commendable top 10 place finish, while breaking various club records. His records include highest ever scoring wins for both home and away games. The team ended up being the 2nd highest scoring team in the league, just behind Fabio Cannavaro's Tianjin Quanjian. On 26 November 2016, Shanghai Shenxin announced that they had parted company with White by mutual agreement, which shocked fans due to the positive impact White had brought to the club.

=== Chinese Taipei ===
On 15 September 2017, White was officially announced as head coach and technical director of the Chinese Taipei, with his first games in charge coming against Mongolia and Bahrain on the 5 and 10 October. His appointment saw an immediate improvement in results for Chinese Taipei, with a 4–2 friendly win against Mongolia in his first game, and a shock 2–1 win against Bahrain in a 2019 AFC Asian Cup qualifier. Before White was appointed, Chinese Taipei had lost the reverse fixture 5–0 to Bahrain.

White's winning percentage with Chinese Taipei was 58.3% and the national team won every home match under his leadership. The team also reached their highest FIFA ranking of 121st during his tenure.

=== Hong Kong ===
White was announced as Hong Kong's head coach on 10 September 2018. White's positive impact on results for Hong Kong has been immediate, as White lead them to qualification to the 2019 East Asia Cup finals after beating DPR Korea, Taiwan and Mongolia to the top spot during the semi-finals. This was the first time since 2010 that Hong Kong have qualified for East Asia's premier competition.

On 11 Dec 2018, White tendered his resignation in order to join a club in Japan.

=== Tokyo Verdy ===
On 12 December 2018, it was announced White would be leaving his role at Hong Kong to take over at J2 League club Tokyo Verdy.

White was named manager of the month in May 2019 due to the clubs excellent form but after some heavy interference from board members and sponsors regarding player signings, White finally resigned.

=== Nantong Zhiyun FC ===
White was appointed as manager of Chinese League One club Nantong Zhiyun on 20 August 2019. White was brought into save the club from relegation and did so in style. White was named 'the magic fireman" due to his strong reputation in Chinese professional football for saving clubs in need. Due to Coronaviral disease 2019 the Chinese football league was suspended and White and the club separated by mutual consent.

=== Suzhou Dongwu FC ===
White was appointed as manager of Suzhou Dongwu F.C. of the Chinese League One, where he helped the club to many milestones during his 2 successful years in charge. These included the clubs highest ever league finish (8th) and deepest run in the Chinese FA Cup (semi final) . White left in September 2022 due to financial issues at the club.

=== Chinese Taipei ===
On 2 May 2023, White was reappointed as the head coach of Chinese Taipei. In May 2025, White resigned.
