= Dido (footballer) =

Brazilian footballer (born 1962)

Personal information
- Full name: Edson Silva
- Date of birth: 27 June 1962 (age 64)
- Place of birth: Brazil
- Height: 1.80 m (5 ft 11 in)
- Position: Midfielder

Senior career*
Years	Team	Apps	(Gls)
- Flamengo
1984–1986	Santos	2	(0)
1989–1990	Beitar Jerusalem	22	(2)

Managerial career
- 1996: Maccabi Lazarus Holon
- 2001–2002: Vietnam
- 2005: Chinese Taipei
- 2008–2009: Bangladesh
- * Club domestic league appearances and goals

Edson Silva, also known by the nickname Dido (born 27 June 1962), is a Brazilian football coach and former player. He played for Campeonato Brasileiro Série A clubs Flamengo and Santos. He holds a Dutch passport.

== Playing career ==
Dido played as a midfielder for Campeonato Brasileiro Série A clubs Flamengo and Santos. As a Santos player, he played two Série A games in 1984. He has also played in Israel, moving to the country to join Beitar Jerusalem, where he retired in 1996, and started a coaching career, as Maccabi Lazarus Holon's head coach.

== Coaching career ==
Dido coached the national teams of Vietnam in 2001 and in 2002, Chinese Taipei in 2005, and was hired on 31 December 2008 to coach Bangladesh until this contract was terminated on 10 November 2009, prior to the SAFF Cup. Then he went to coach other clubs.
