= Erie Commodores FC =

Erie Commodores
- Full name: Erie Commodores Football Club
- Nicknames: Commodores, ECFC
- Founded: 2009; 17 years ago
- Stadium: Saxon Stadium; Erie, Pennsylvania
- Capacity: 2,300
- Owner: John Melody
- Head Coach: Catalin Nastuta
- League: National Premier Soccer League
- Website: eriecommodores.com
Home colors

Erie Commodores FC is an American soccer team based in Erie, Pennsylvania, competing in the National Premier Soccer League (NPSL), the fourth tier of the American Soccer Pyramid. The team plays its home games at Saxon Stadium, located on the campus of Mercyhurst University.

The SeaWolves adopted the name "Commodores" to honor Oliver Hazard Perry, a U.S. Navy commodore who commanded forces from Erie's Presque Isle Bay during the Battle of Lake Erie, a pivotal event in the War of 1812. Perry's flagship, the USS Niagara, flew the iconic "Don't Give up the Ship" battle flag, both elements featured in the Commodores' logo. The Erie Maritime Museum now maintains the Niagara at Presque Isle Bay.

== History ==
In 2009, local soccer coach Pedro Argáez founded "Erie Admirals SC", building upon an existing youth program. John Melody, a former player at Mercyhurst University, initially served as head coach and later took full ownership of the club. On April 24, 2015, Melody rebranded the team as "Erie Commodores FC". He appointed Micky Blythe—a fellow Mercyhurst alumnus—as head coach for one season, followed by Neil Brown (holding a UEFA A License) for the 2015 NPSL campaign.

In 2021, they announced addition of a senior women's team to its overall program, to play in the United Women's Soccer League Two.

=== Player development ===
Several Commodores alums have advanced to professional soccer, including:

- Adam Clement, signed by Vancouver Whitecaps FC (MLS)
- Sam Dorf, signed by Waterford FC (League of Ireland 1st Division)
- Jeremy Deighton, Greg Blum, and Neil Shaffer, who played with Pittsburgh Riverhounds SC (USL)
- Danny Deakin, drafted by Orlando City SC in the 2017 MLS SuperDraft

=== Rust‑Belt rivalries and venue changes ===
The Commodores developed rivalries with fellow Rust Belt Conference teams, such as Cleveland SC. In 2020, the club participated in the NPSL Members Cup, alongside Cleveland SC, FC Buffalo, and Pittsburgh Hotspurs. They also contested the Erie County Derby against FC Buffalo until Buffalo's move to USL League Two in 2023.

From 2013 to 2021, the team played at McConnell Family Stadium on the campus of Gannon University. In 2022, the Commodores relocated to Saxon Stadium on the Mercyhurst University campus, a facility that seats approximately 2,300 spectators and features a synthetic turf playing surface.

=== Brewers Cup ===
In 2024, Erie revived its rivalry with FC Buffalo through the Erie County Brewers Cup, sponsored by John Russell Brewing (Erie) and Big Ditch Brewing (Buffalo). The two-leg series featured a commissioned tropical IPA, "Lake Erie Life," released by the collaborating breweries.

=== 2025 season ===
During the 2025 NPSL campaign, Erie qualified for the Great Lakes conference playoffs by defeating Cleveland SC on July 5, marking another strong season under the club's continued leadership.

== Current roster ==
As of June 13, 2026

Note: Flags indicate national team as defined under FIFA eligibility rules; some limited exceptions apply. Players may hold more than one non-FIFA nationality.

No.	Pos.	Nation	Player
1	GK	ESP	Aimar Armendia
2	DF	JPN	Rikito Takeuchi
3	DF	FRA	Mathieu Beuvain
4	DF	USA	Jack Emanuel
5	DF	NED	Kaj Schroder
6	DF	TPE	Martin Baudelet
7	MF	ESP	Alvar Silva
8	MF	ESP	Alex Sanchez
9	FW	COL	Julian Tovar
10	MF	ENG	Dylan Sumner
11	MF	FRA	David Citron
12	GK	GER	Tim Teicher
13	FW	ESP	Alvaro Planas

No.	Pos.	Nation	Player
14	DF	WAL	Dylan Dinham
16	FW	USA	Andy Jones
18	MF	COL	Santiago Bustamante
19	MF	COL	Santiago Giraldo
20	MF	ENG	Will Perry
21	FW	CAY	Syrus Connolly
22	FW	JPN	Masaki Tsuji
24	MF	USA	Owen Petersen
25	GK	ARG	Alan Horrocks
26	MF	JPN	Taiyo Baba
29	DF	JPN	Sho Kinjo
31	MF	USA	Charlie Petersen
32	GK	USA	Reece Kordes

== Year-by-year ==
Year	Tier	League	Regular season	GP	W	D	L	Pts	PPG	Playoffs	U.S. Open Cup
2009	4	NPSL	1st of 6, Eastern Keystone	10	9	1	0	28	2.80	Won Division Final vs. Boston Aztec, 2-0; Won National Semifinal vs. Rocket City United, 4-2; Lost National Final vs. Sonoma County Sol, 2-1 (a.e.t.)	ineligible
2010	4	NPSL	2nd of 7, Northeast-Keystone	12	10	0	2	30	2.50	did not qualify	did not qualify
2011	4	NPSL	1st of 8, Northeast-Keystone	12	10	1	1	31	2.58	Won Division Final vs. Brooklyn Italians, 1-0; Lost National Semifinal vs. Jacksonville United, 4-2; Won 3rd Place Game vs. Milwaukee Bavarians, 5-0	did not qualify
2012	4	NPSL	1st of 5, Midwest-Great Lakes	12	6	5	1	23	1.92	Won Conference Semifinal vs. Greater Binghamton FC, 1-0; Lost Conference Final vs. AFC Cleveland, 1-1 (a.e.t.) (4-3 PKs)	did not qualify
2013	4	NPSL	3rd of 6, Midwest-Great Lakes	12	6	3	3	21	1.75	Won Conference Semifinal vs. FC Buffalo, 5-2; Won Conference Final vs. Detroit City FC, 4-1; Won Region Final vs. Quad City Eagles, 1-0; Lost National Semifinal vs. RVA Football Club, 4-0	declined
2014	4	NPSL	2nd of 4, Midwest-Great Lakes East	14	6	2	6	20	1.43	did not qualify	did not qualify
2015	4	NPSL	7th of 13, Midwest	12	5	0	7	15	1.25	did not qualify	did not qualify
2016	4	NPSL	5th of 6, Midwest-Great Lakes East	10	2	4	4	10	1.00	did not qualify	did not qualify
2017	4	NPSL	1st of 7, Midwest-East	12	6	3	3	21	1.75	Lost Region Quarterfinal vs. Dayton Dynamo, 1-0	did not qualify
2018	4	NPSL	1st of 7, Midwest-East	12	8	3	1	27	2.25	Lost Region Quarterfinal vs. Cleveland SC, 4-0	Won First Round vs. Rochester River Dogz FC, 1-1 (a.e.t) (5-4 PKs); Lost Second Round vs. Pittsburgh Riverhounds SC, 2-1
2019	4	NPSL	3rd of 6, Midwest-East	10	4	4	2	16	1.60	did not qualify	Lost First Round vs. Dayton Dutch Lions, 2-1
2020	4	NPSL	Cancelled due to COVID-19 pandemic	0	0	0	0	0	0.00	Not played	Not played
2021	4	NPSL	4th of 6, Midwest-Rust Belt	10	1	4	5	7	0.70	did not qualify	Not played
2022	4	NPSL	4th of 5, Midwest-Rust Belt	12	3	2	7	11	0.92	did not qualify	did not qualify
2023	4	NPSL	5th of 7, Midwest-Great Lakes	12	5	1	6	16	1.33	did not qualify	did not qualify
2024	4	NPSL	6th of 8, Midwest-Great Lakes	10	3	3	4	12	1.20	did not qualify	did not qualify
2025	4	NPSL	4th of 8, Midwest-Great Lakes	10	6	0	4	18	1.80	Lost Conference Semifinal vs. Flower City Union, 3-1 (a.e.t.)	did not qualify
2026	4	NPSL	1st of 7, Great Lakes	12	10	1	1	31	2.58	Lost Conference Semifinal vs. Flower City Union, 2-1	did not qualify

== Honors ==
National:

- NPSL National Runners-Up: 2009
- NPSL National Semifinalist, 3rd Place Winner: 2011

Region/Historical Equivalent:

- NPSL Midwest Region Champions: 2013
- NPSL Northeast Division Champions: 2011
- NPSL Eastern Division Champions: 2009

Conference/Historical Equivalent:

- NPSL Midwest Region-East Conference Champions: 2017, 2018
- NPSL Midwest Region-Great Lakes Conference Playoff Champions: 2013
- NPSL Midwest Region-Great Lakes Conference Regular Season Champions: 2012
- NPSL Northeast Division-Keystone Conference Champions: 2011
- NPSL Eastern Keystone Division Champions: 2009

Rivalry:

- Erie County Derby Champions (vs FC Buffalo): 2009, 2010, 2011, 2012, 2013, 2014, 2018, 2022

Note: Beginning with the 2025 NPSL season, conference champions are now determined by the playoffs, rather than regular season standings. In 2026, regions were discontinued, with conference champions now advancing to the National Playoffs.

== Stadia ==
- Saxon Stadium (2022–Present)
- McConnell Family Stadium (2013, 2016–2021)
- Gus Anderson Field (2014–2015)
- Dollinger Field (2012–2013)
- Penn State Behrend Soccer/Lacrosse Complex (2010–2011)
- Family First Sports Park (2009–2010)

== Notable former players ==
The following players have either played at the professional or international level, either before or after playing for the team:

- (Chinese Taipei) Martin Baudelet
- (Canada) Calum Ferguson
- (Cayman Islands) Syrus Connolly
- (Eritrea) Ezana Kahsay
- (Trinidad and Tobago) Malcolm Shaw
