= Taichung =

Special municipality in central Taiwan

Taichung City 臺中市 (Note: In local languages: Traditional Chinese script: 臺中市; Mandarin Pinyin: Táizhōng Shì; Hokkien: Tâi-tiong Tshī; Sixian Hakka: Tǒi-zóng Sii; Hailu Hakka: Toi-zhùng Shi^{+})
- Special municipality
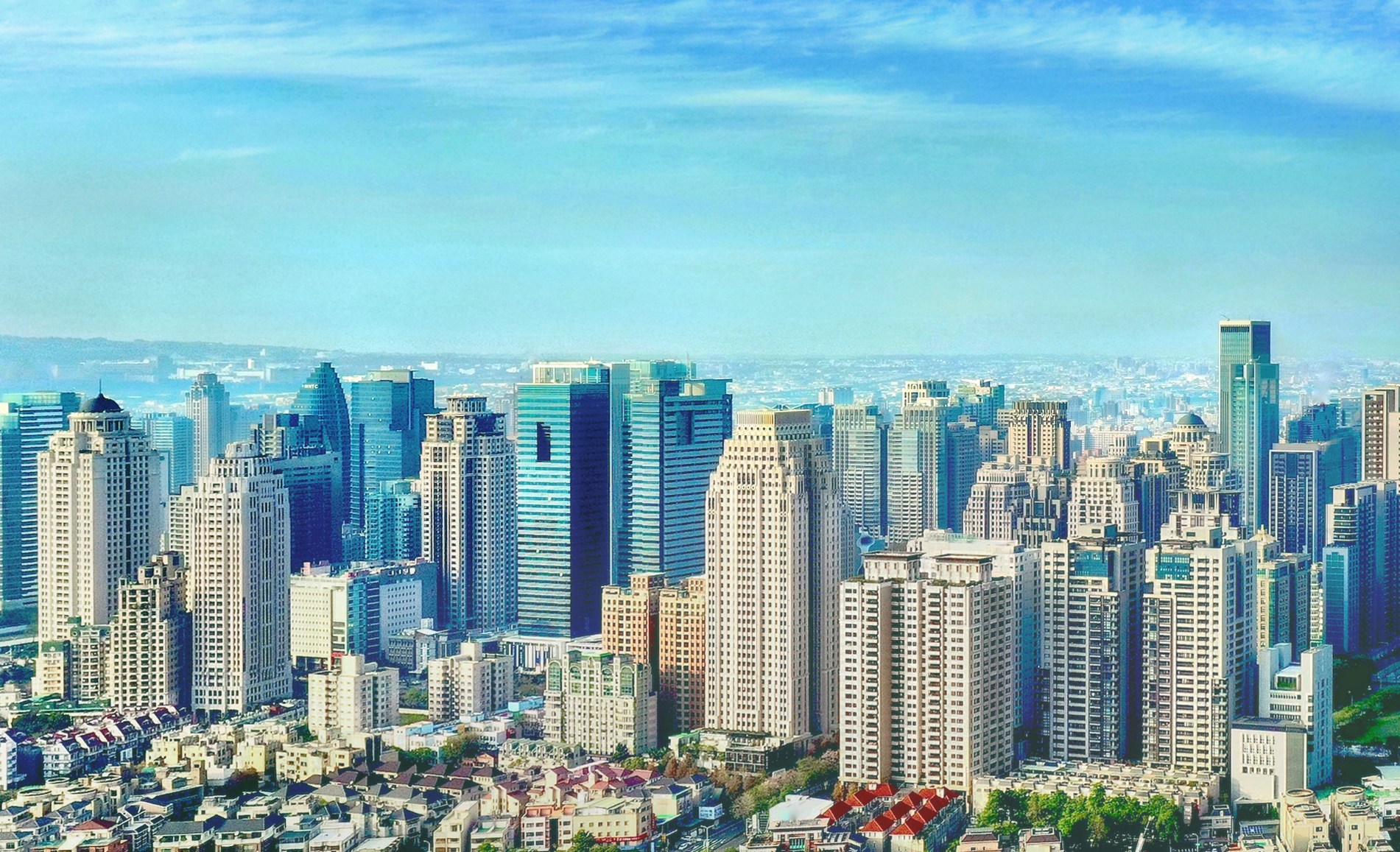
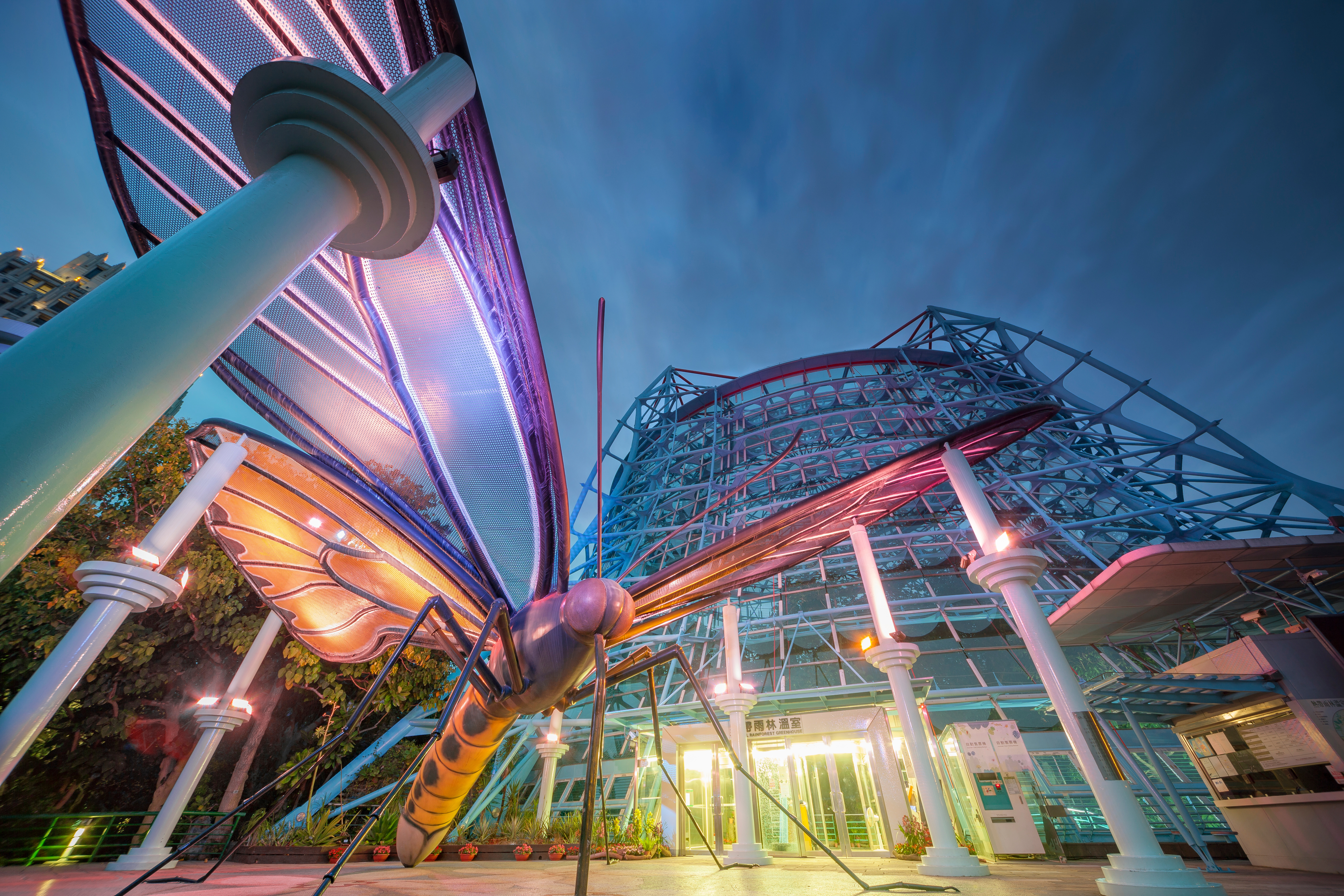
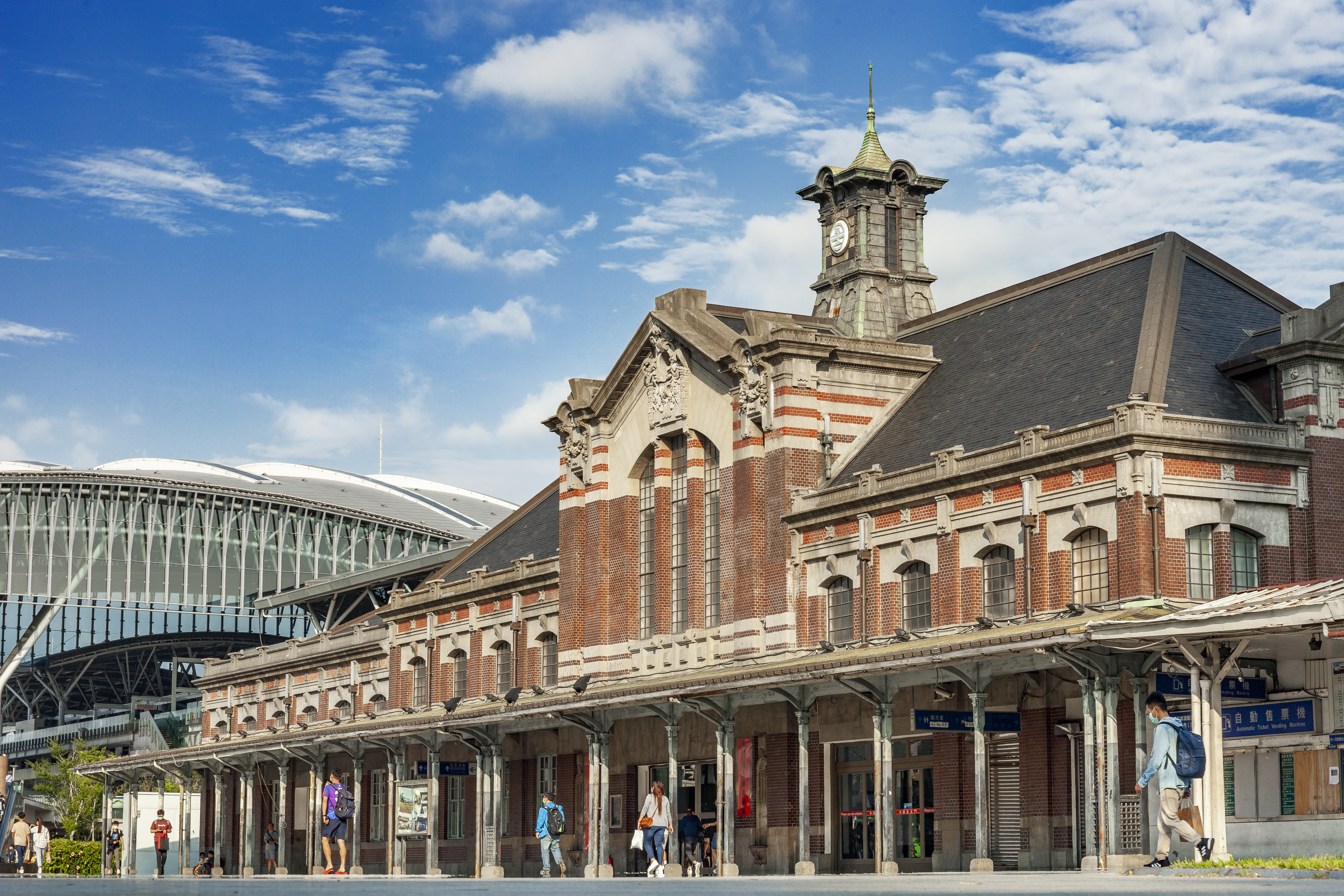
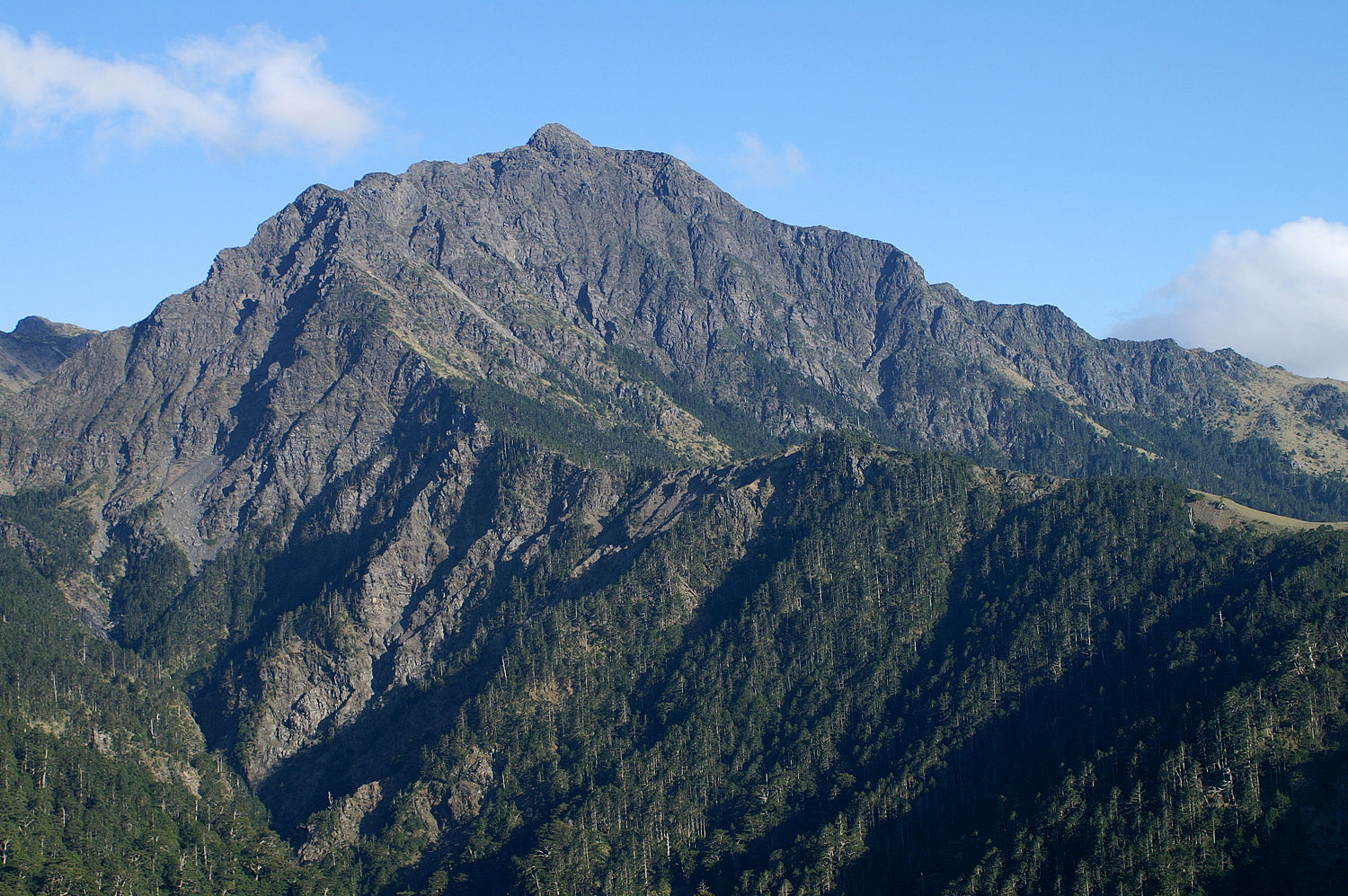
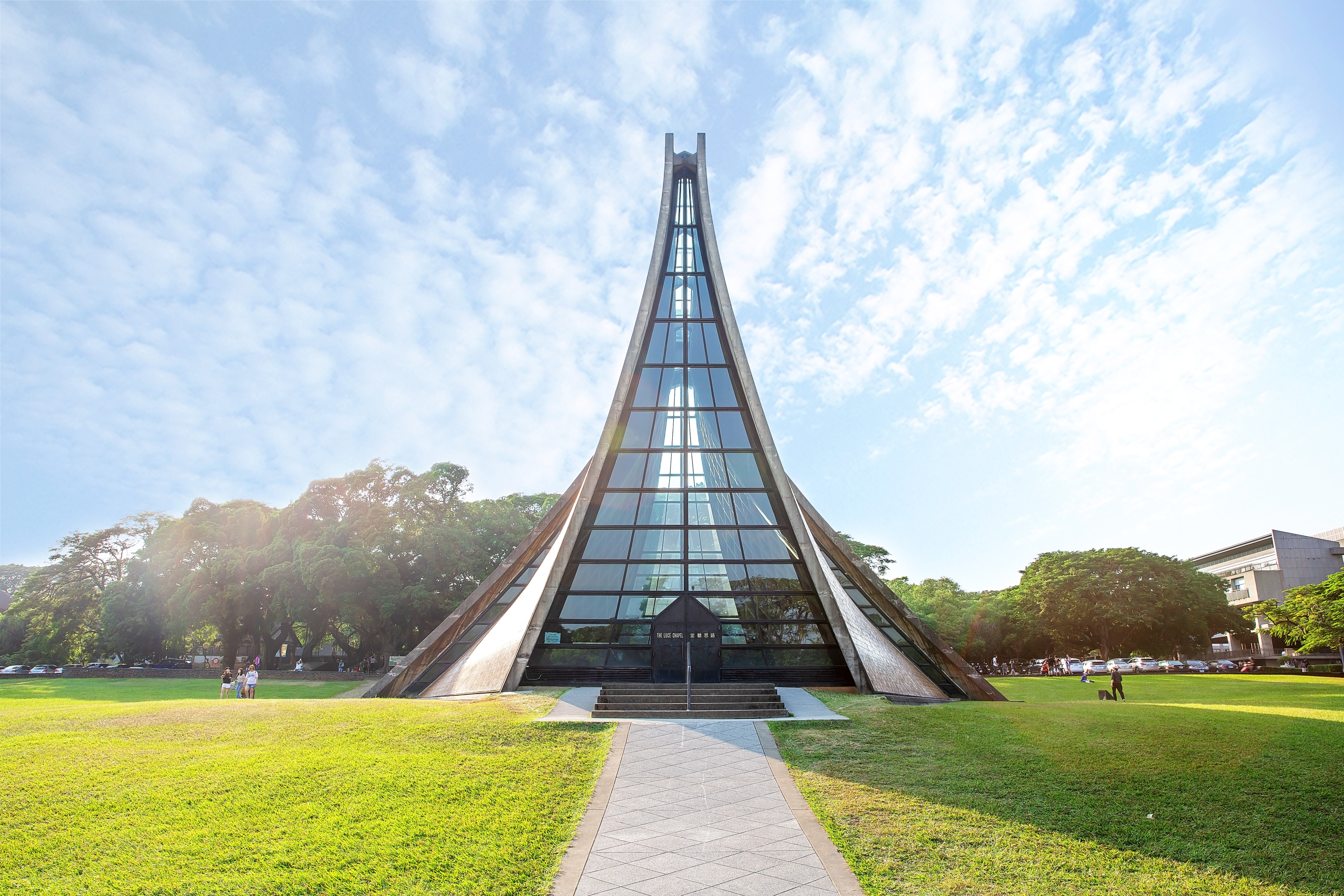
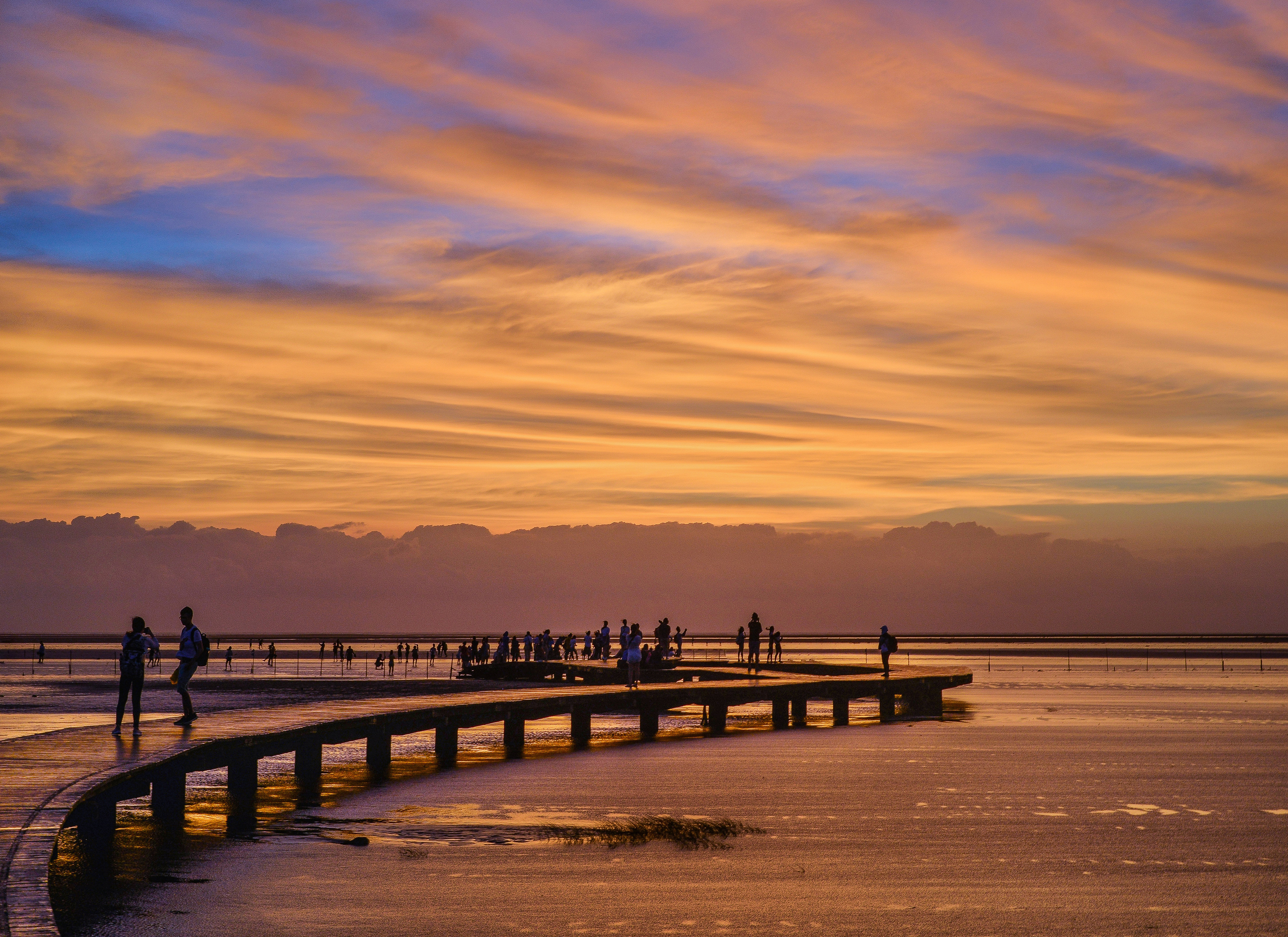
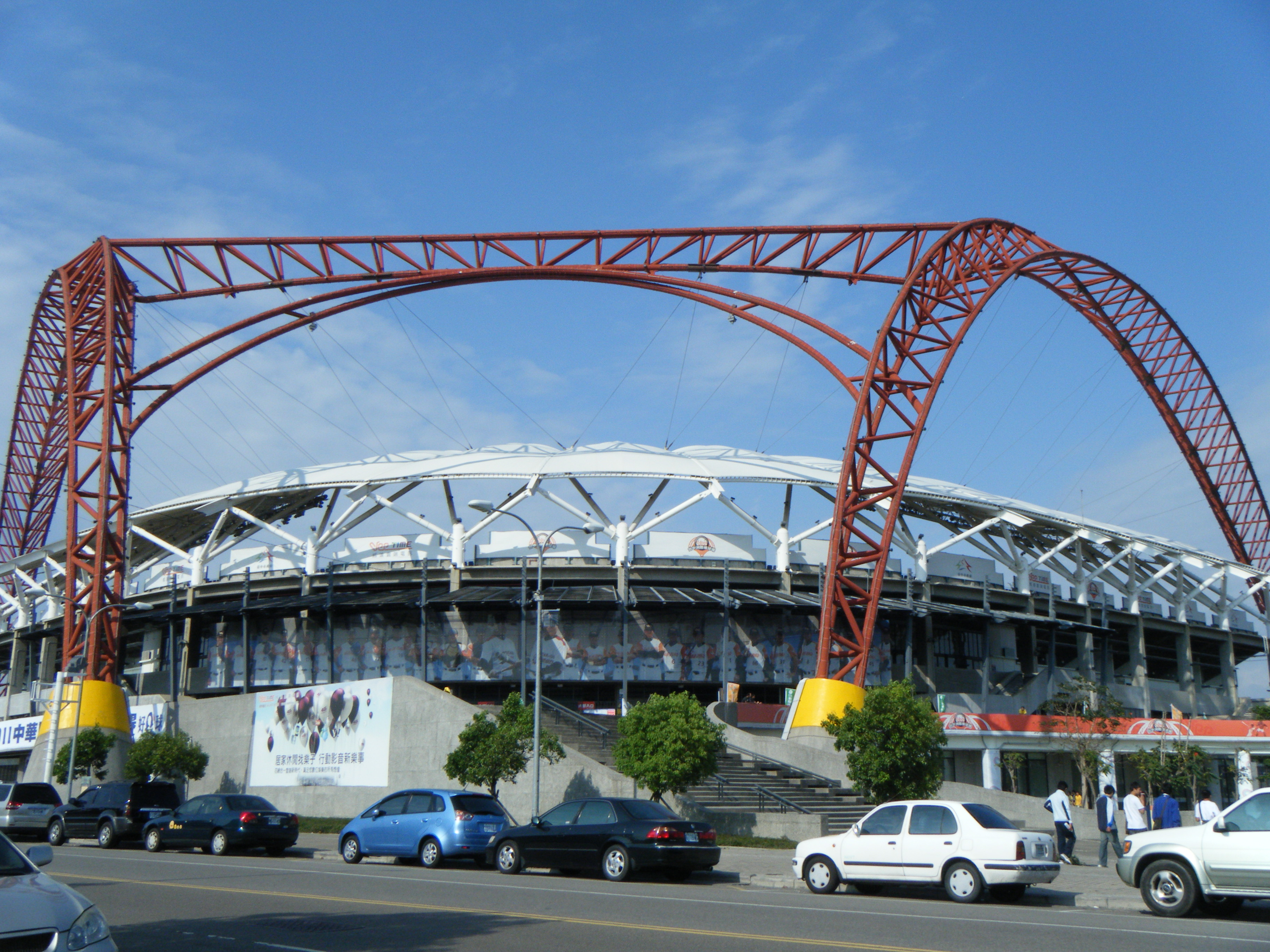
- Skyline of Taichung's 7th Redevelopment Zone National Museum of Natural Science Taichung railway station Nanhu Mountain Luce Memorial Chapel Gaomei Wetlands Taichung Intercontinental Baseball Stadium

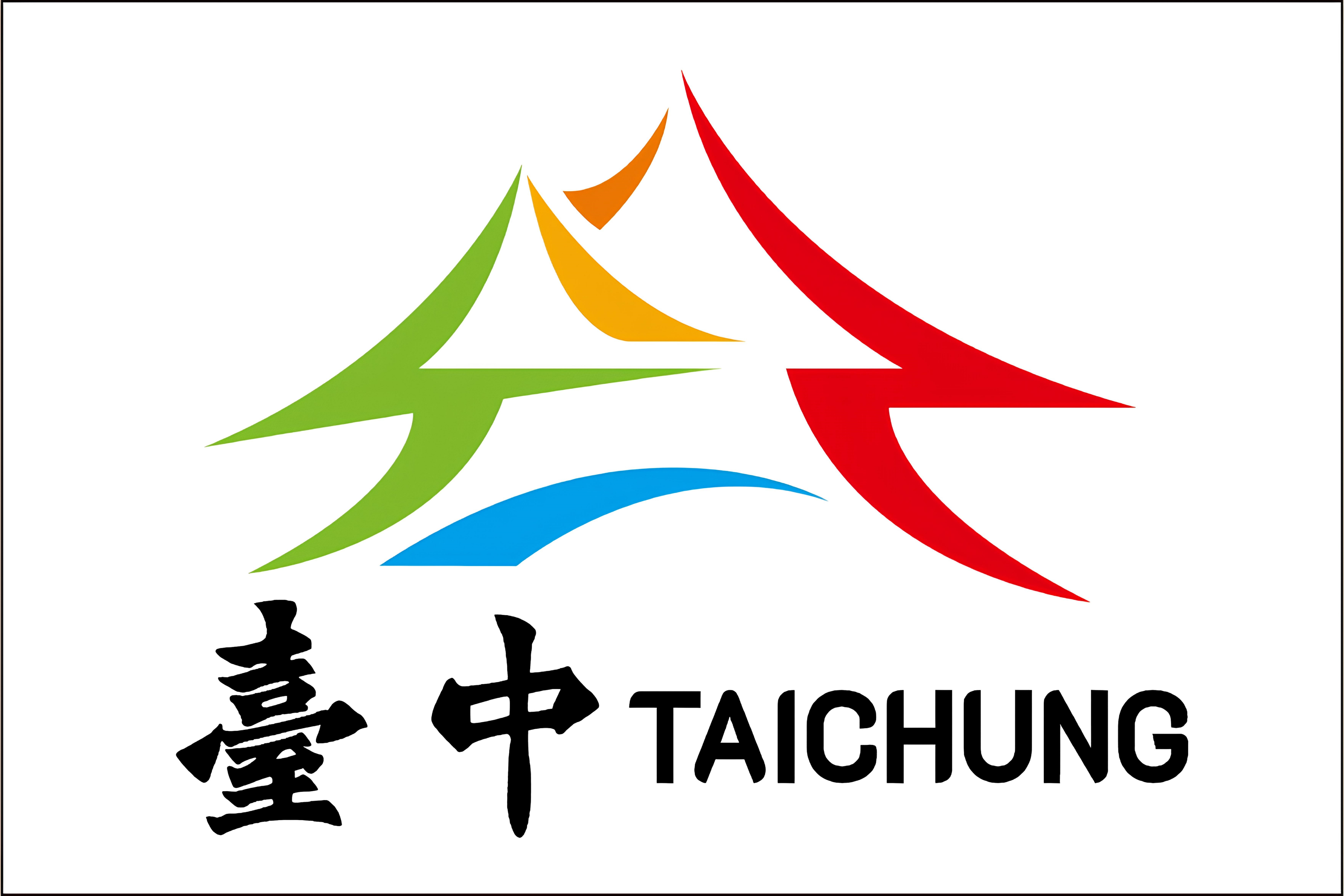
- Flag Logo
- Etymology: Taichū (Japanese: 臺中; Central Taiwan)
- Nickname: Cultural City (文化城)
- Coordinates: 24°08′38″N 120°40′46″E
- Country: Republic of China (Taiwan)
- Established: 1887
- Provincial city status: 25 October 1945
- Upgraded to special municipality and merger with Taichung County: 25 December 2010
- Seat: Xitun District
- Districts: 29: Central; East; West; South; North; Xitun; Nantun; Beitun; Fengyuan; Dongshi; Dajia; Qingshui; Shalu; Wuqi; Houli; Shengang; Tanzi; Daya; Xinshe; Shigang; Waipu; Da'an; Wuri; Dadu; Longjing; Wufeng; Taiping; Dali; Heping

Government
  - Body: Taichung City Government; Taichung City Council
  - Mayor: Lu Shiow-yen (KMT)

Area
  - Special municipality: 2,214.89 km^{2} (855.17 sq mi)
  - Urban: 1,801 km^{2} (695 sq mi)
  - Rank: 6 out of 22

Population (Aug 2025)
  - Special municipality: 2,867,848
  - Rank: 2 out of 22
  - Density: 1,294.80/km^{2} (3,353.53/sq mi)
  - Urban: 3,799,301
  - Urban density: 2,110/km^{2} (5,464/sq mi)
- Time zone: UTC+8 (National Standard Time)
- Postal code: 400-439
- Area code: (0)4
- ISO 3166 code: TW-TXG
- Bird: White-eared sibia
- Flower: Taiwan cherry
- Tree: Taiwan white pine
- Website: english.taichung.gov.tw

Taichung City
- "Taichung" in Traditional (top) and Simplified (bottom) Chinese characters

Chinese name
- Traditional Chinese: 臺中市
- Simplified Chinese: 台中市
- Literal meaning: "Tai[wan] Central"
Transcriptions
Standard Mandarin
- Hanyu Pinyin: Táizhōng Shì
- Bopomofo: ㄊㄞˊ ㄓㄨㄥ ㄕˋ
- Gwoyeu Romatzyh: Tairjong Shyh
- Wade–Giles: Tʻai^{2}-chung^{1}
- Tongyong Pinyin: Táijhong Shìh
- Yale Romanization: Táijūng Shr̀
- MPS2: Táijūng Shr̀
- IPA: [tʰǎɪ.ʈʂʊ́ŋ ʂɻ̩̂]
Hakka
- Pha̍k-fa-sṳ: Thòi-chûng-sṳ
Yue: Cantonese
- Yale Romanization: Tòihjūng Síh
- Jyutping: toi4 zung1 si5
- IPA: [tʰɔj˩ tsʊŋ˥ si˩˧]
Southern Min
- Hokkien POJ: Tâi-tiong-chhī
- Tâi-lô: Tâi-tiong-tshī

Japanese name
- Hiragana: たいちゅうし
- Katakana: タイチュウシ
- Kyūjitai: 臺中市
- Shinjitai: 台中市
Transcriptions
- Romanization: Taichū-shi
- Kunrei-shiki: Taityuu-si

Taichung (/ˌtaɪˈtʃʊŋ/, Wade–Giles: Tʻai^{2}-chung^{1}, Pinyin Táizhōng), officially Taichung City, is a special municipality in central Taiwan. Taichung is Taiwan's second-largest city, with more than 2.86 million residents, making it the largest city in Central Taiwan. It serves as the core of the Taichung–Changhua metropolitan area, Taiwan's second-largest metropolitan area.

Located in the Taichung Basin, the city was initially developed from several scattered hamlets helmed by the Taiwanese indigenous peoples. It was constructed to be the new capital of Taiwan Province and renamed "Taiwan-fu" in the late Qing dynastic era between 1887 and 1894. During the Japanese era from 1895, the urban planning of present-day Taichung was performed and developed by the Japanese. The urban area of Taichung was organized as a provincial city from the start of ROC rule in 1945 until 25 December 2010, when the original provincial city and Taichung County were merged into a new special municipality.

The city is home to the National Museum of Natural Science, the National Taiwan Museum of Fine Arts, the National Taichung Theater, the National Library of Public Information, National Taiwan Museum of Comics, National Taiwan Symphony Orchestra, as well as many cultural sites, including the historic Taichung Park, the Lin Family Gardens, and many temples.

== History ==
=== Early history ===
The Atayal aborigines as well as several Taiwanese Plains Aboriginal tribes (including the Taokas, Papora, Pazeh, Hoanya and Babuzas) populated the plains that make up modern Taichung. They were originally hunter gatherers who later lived by cultivating millet and taro. In the 17th century, the Papora, Babuza, Pazeh, and Hoanya established the Kingdom of Middag, occupying the western part of present-day Taichung.

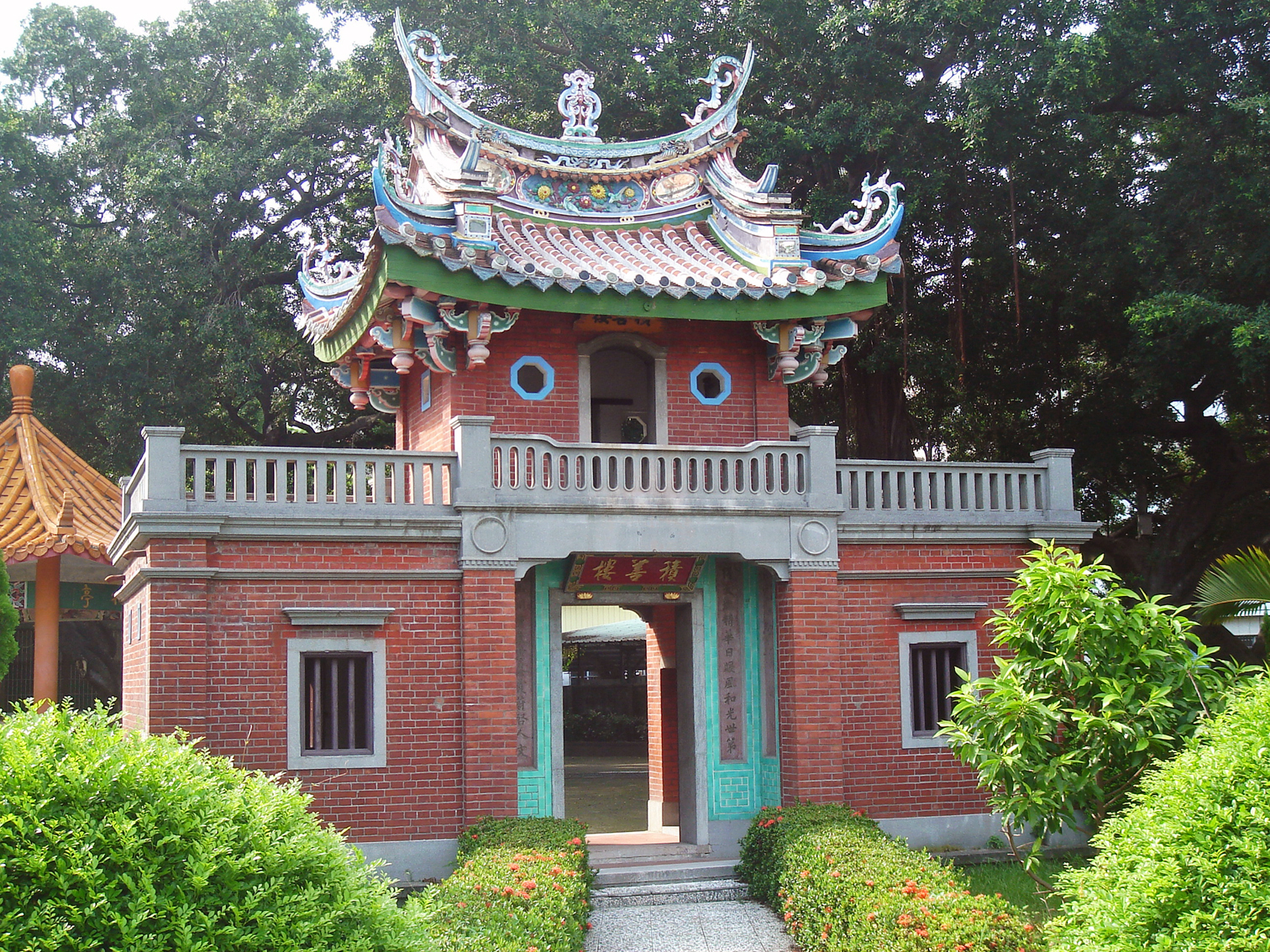
Jishan Gatehouse, built in 1924

=== Qing dynasty ===
In 1684, Zhuluo County was established, encompassing the underdeveloped northern two-thirds of Taiwan. Modern-day Taichung traces its beginnings to a settlement named Toatun (Chinese: 大墩; pinyin: Dàdūn; Wade–Giles: Ta^{⁴}-tun^{¹}; Pe̍h-ōe-jī: Toā-tun; lit. 'large mound') in 1705. To strengthen Qing control, a garrison was established in 1721 near the site of present-day Taichung Park by Lan Ting-chen.

North of the city, on the Dajia River, an aboriginal revolt broke out in 1731 after Chinese officials moved in and compelled them to provide labor. The revolt spread through the city as far south as Changhua County in May 1732 before the rebels were chased into the mountains by Qing forces. In 1786, another rebellion against the Qing, known as the Lin Shuangwen rebellion, began as an attempt to overthrow the government and restore the Ming dynasty. Unfortunately, as the rebels moved northward, they turned to slaughter and looting. They were eventually defeated by a coalition of Qing forces, Hakka, Quanzhou Fujianese descendants, and aboriginal volunteers.

When Taiwan Province was declared an independent province in 1887, the government intended to construct its capital city at the centrally located Toatun, which was also designated as the seat of Taiwan Prefecture. Thus the city took the title of "Taiwan-fu", meaning "capital city of Taiwan", from modern-day Tainan, which had held the title for more than 200 years. Qing official Liu Ming-chuan received permission to oversee development of the area, which included constructing a railway through the city. However, the provincial capital was ultimately moved to Taipei.

=== Empire of Japan ===
After the Qing dynasty lost the Sino-Japanese War in 1895, Taiwan was ceded to Japan by the Treaty of Shimonoseki, and the name of the city was changed to Taichū (Japanese: 臺中). The Japanese sought to develop the city to make it the first "modern" area of Taiwan and invested in roads, dams, and levees. In 1901, Taichū Chō (臺中廳) was established as one of 20 local administrative districts on the island. In 1904, the town of Taichū had a population of 6,423, and Taichū District had more than 207,000.

Taichū Park was completed in 1903. A tower marking the old north gate was moved to the new park where it stands today. The first market in Taichū was built in 1908, along Jiguang Road between the Zhongzheng and Chenggong Roads and it is still in use today. The Japanese undertook a north–south island railway project. Taichū Railway Station was completed and began operation in 1917, and still operates today. Taichū City was officially declared by Japanese authorities in 1920, and Taichū City Hall was completed in 1924 after 11 years of construction. Kōkan Airport (公館空港), now known as Taichung Airport, was constructed during Japanese rule.

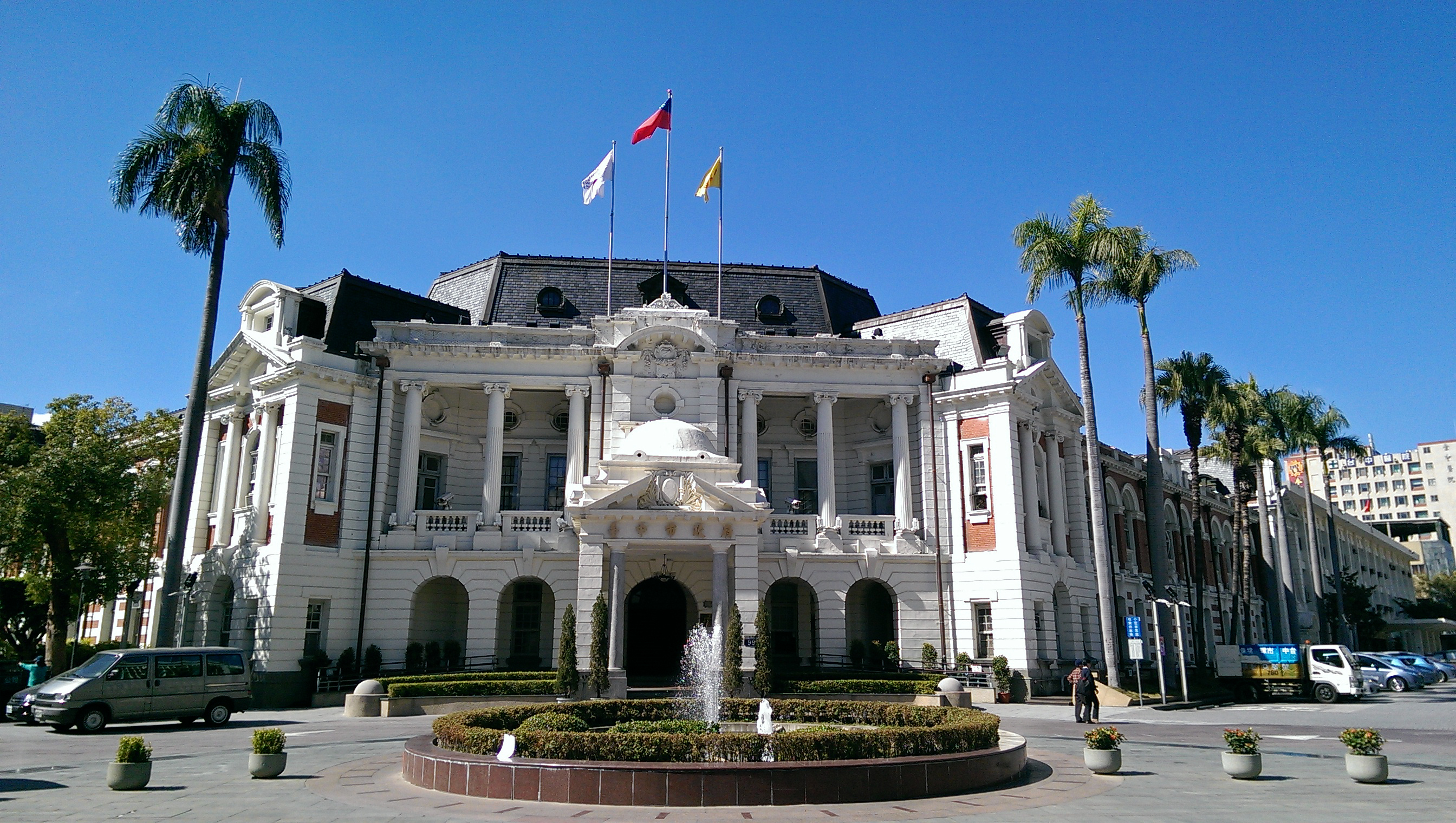
Taichung's historic city hall

Taichū Middle School (now known as Taichung First Senior High School) was founded in 1915 by elite members of local gentry, including Lin Hsien-tang and his brother Lin Lie-tang, two wealthy Taiwanese intellectuals of the era. This was in an effort to teach children the culture of Taiwan and to foster the spirit of the Taiwanese localization movement. The Taiwanese Cultural Association, founded in 1921 in Taipei by Lin Hsien-tang, was moved to Taichū in 1927. Most of the members of this association were from Taichū and the surrounding area. The city became a center of Taiwanese culture and nationalism.

From 1926 to 1945, Taichū Prefecture covered modern-day Taichung as well as Changhua County and Nantou County.

=== Republic of China ===
After the handover of Taiwan from Japan to the Republic of China in October 1945, Taichung County was established, which consists of present-day area of Taichung City, Miaoli County and Taoyuan City. In 1947 the first mayor of Taichung County (which included Taichung City) was Lai Tien Shen. The position was appointed by the government to rule during the interim period. Taichung also served as the temporary capital of the exiled Jiangxi (Kiangsi) provincial government in 1949 after the Chinese Communist Party took control of the province. In 1950, Miaoli and Taoyuan were taken out from Taichung County area to form Miaoli County and Taoyuan County respectively. In June 2009, the Executive Yuan approved the plan to merge Taichung City and Taichung County to form a larger Taichung City. On 25 December 2010, the city was merged with the surrounding Taichung County to create a special municipality of 2.65 million people spread across 2,214 km^{2} (855 sq mi).

In 2020, Taichung was classified as a "Gamma" level global city by the Globalization and World Cities Research Network.

== Geography ==
Taichung City is in the Taichung Basin along the main western coastal plain that stretches along the west coast from northern Taiwan almost to the southern tip. The city borders Changhua County, Nantou County, Hualien County, Yilan County, Hsinchu County and Miaoli County.

The Central Mountain Range lies just east of the city. Rolling hills run to the north leading to Miaoli County, while flat coastal plains dominate the landscape to the south leading to Changhua County and the Taiwan Strait to the west. The Dadu Plateau lies to the northwest.

=== Climate ===
Taichung has a warm humid subtropical climate (Köppen Cwa) bordering on both a tropical monsoon climate and a tropical savanna climate, with an average annual temperature of 23.3 °C (73.9 °F). The highest temperature of the year occurs in July and August, while the lowest temperature occurs in January and February. Daytime temperatures remain warm to hot year-round, though night time temperatures during the winter months are significantly cooler than those during the summer and the warm daytime temperature. Its average annual rainfall is just above 1,700 mm (67 in), relatively low compared to other major cities of Taiwan. The average humidity is 80%.

Due to the protection provided by the Central Mountain Range to the east and the Miaoli hills to the north, Taichung is rarely severely affected by typhoons, but typhoons emerging from the South China Sea occasionally pose a threat to the city, as evidenced by Typhoon Wayne in 1986, which struck Taiwan's west coast near Taichung.

Climate data for Taichung (1991–2020 normals, extremes 1897–present）
Month	Jan	Feb	Mar	Apr	May	Jun	Jul	Aug	Sep	Oct	Nov	Dec	Year
Record high °C (°F)	31.3 (88.3)	33.2 (91.8)	34.7 (94.5)	34.7 (94.5)	37.0 (98.6)	36.8 (98.2)	39.9 (103.8)	39.3 (102.7)	39.0 (102.2)	38.3 (100.9)	34.0 (93.2)	31.7 (89.1)	39.9 (103.8)
Mean daily maximum °C (°F)	22.3 (72.1)	22.9 (73.2)	25.2 (77.4)	28.1 (82.6)	30.7 (87.3)	32.3 (90.1)	33.3 (91.9)	32.7 (90.9)	32.2 (90.0)	30.3 (86.5)	27.6 (81.7)	23.9 (75.0)	28.5 (83.2)
Daily mean °C (°F)	17.0 (62.6)	17.7 (63.9)	20.1 (68.2)	23.5 (74.3)	26.4 (79.5)	28.1 (82.6)	28.9 (84.0)	28.4 (83.1)	27.8 (82.0)	25.5 (77.9)	22.6 (72.7)	18.7 (65.7)	23.7 (74.7)
Mean daily minimum °C (°F)	13.4 (56.1)	14.2 (57.6)	16.4 (61.5)	20.1 (68.2)	23.1 (73.6)	24.9 (76.8)	25.5 (77.9)	25.3 (77.5)	24.6 (76.3)	22.2 (72.0)	19.0 (66.2)	15.1 (59.2)	20.3 (68.5)
Record low °C (°F)	−0.7 (30.7)	−1.0 (30.2)	2.1 (35.8)	8.6 (47.5)	10.8 (51.4)	15.5 (59.9)	20.5 (68.9)	20.0 (68.0)	14.4 (57.9)	10.5 (50.9)	1.4 (34.5)	1.8 (35.2)	−1.0 (30.2)
Average precipitation mm (inches)	36.6 (1.44)	63.0 (2.48)	86.9 (3.42)	126.8 (4.99)	249.6 (9.83)	329.0 (12.95)	303.3 (11.94)	340.8 (13.42)	147.5 (5.81)	25.0 (0.98)	23.8 (0.94)	30.5 (1.20)	1,762.8 (69.4)
Average precipitation days (≥ 0.1 mm)	6.6	8.0	10.1	10.8	12.3	14.1	13.5	15.8	8.5	3.0	4.1	5.3	112.1
Average relative humidity (%)	74.4	75.2	74.6	75.1	75.7	76.2	74.9	77.4	74.3	70.8	72.4	72.6	74.5
Mean monthly sunshine hours	174.0	148.3	152.7	138.2	154.6	160.9	192.7	161.5	173.1	205.9	174.4	174.2	2,010.5
Source: Central Weather Bureau

== Demographics ==
Historical population
Year	Pop.	±%
1946	525,371	—
1950	660,499	+25.7%
1955	772,963	+17.0%
1960	903,556	+16.9%
1965	1,052,354	+16.5%
1970	1,234,043	+17.3%
1975	1,408,444	+14.1%
1980	1,606,603	+14.1%
1985	1,817,125	+13.1%
1990	2,019,959	+11.2%
1995	2,257,950	+11.8%
2000	2,460,098	+9.0%
2005	2,587,828	+5.2%
2010	2,648,419	+2.3%
2015	2,744,445	+3.6%
2020	2,820,787	+2.8%
2025	2,868,465	+1.7%
source : 1. 臺中縣政府 1959; 2. 臺中市政府 1967; 3. 臺中縣政府 1969; 4. 臺中縣政府 1979; 5. 臺中市政府 1981; 6. 臺中縣政府 1981; 7. "縣市人口按性別及五齡組" (in Chinese (Taiwan)). 內政部戶政司.

Taichung's population was estimated to be 2,867,848 in August 2025. There are slightly more females in the city (50.97%) than males. 24.32% of residents are children, while 16.63% are young people, 52.68% are middle-age, and 6.73% are elderly. According to Ministry of Interior statistics, the fertility rate in Taichung City in 2007 was 1.165 for each woman.

The city surpassed Kaohsiung to become the second largest city in Taiwan in July 2017, growing at the 2nd fastest rate in Taiwan from 2012 to 2017. Recent population increases have been attributed to natural population growth, more people moving to the city, and subsidized housing.

View source data.

== Politics ==
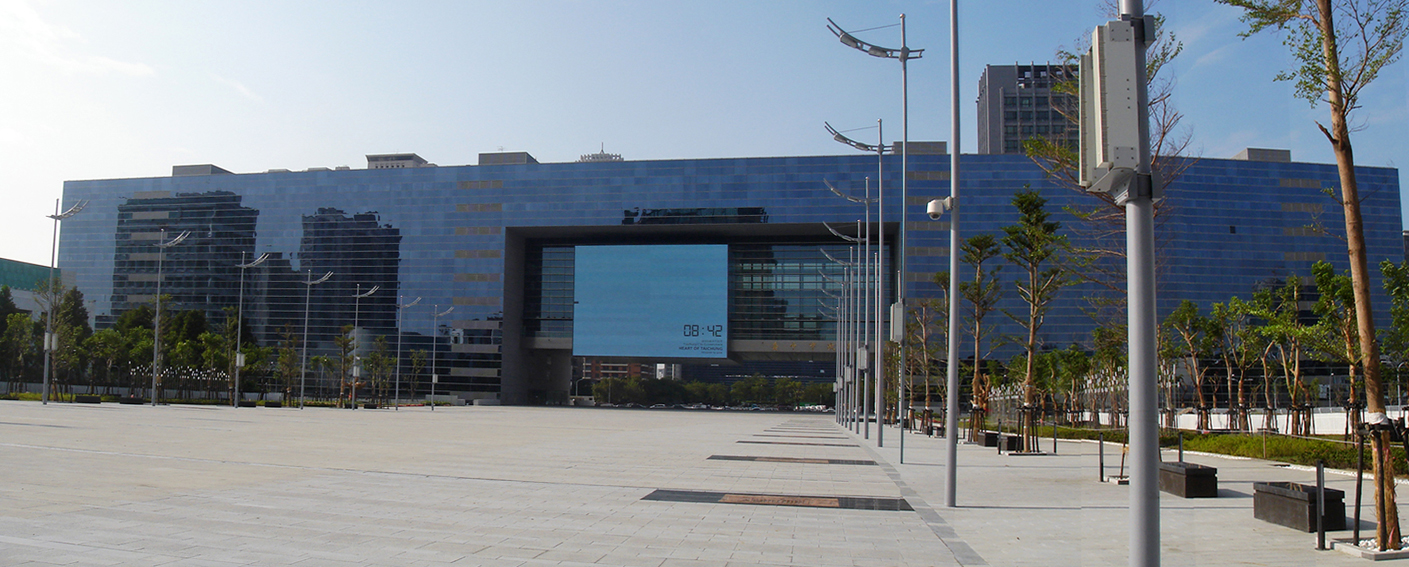
Taichung City Government

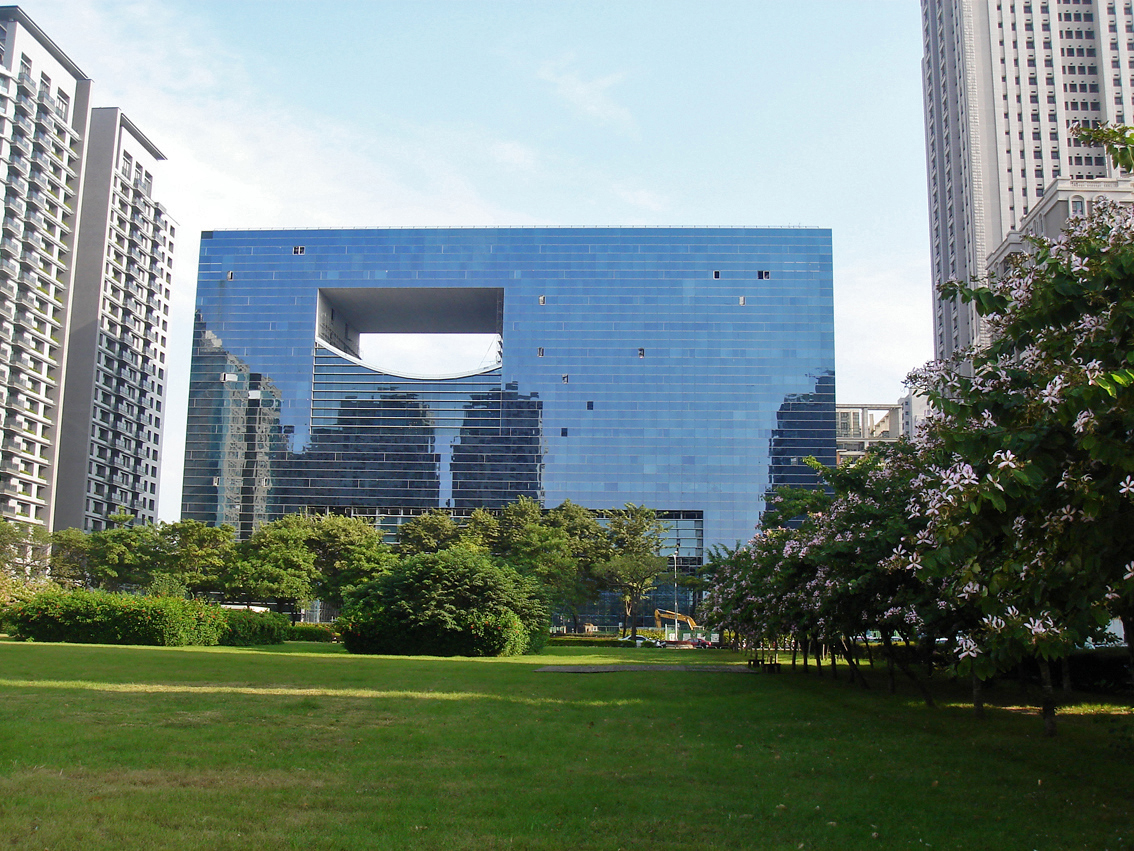
Taichung City Council

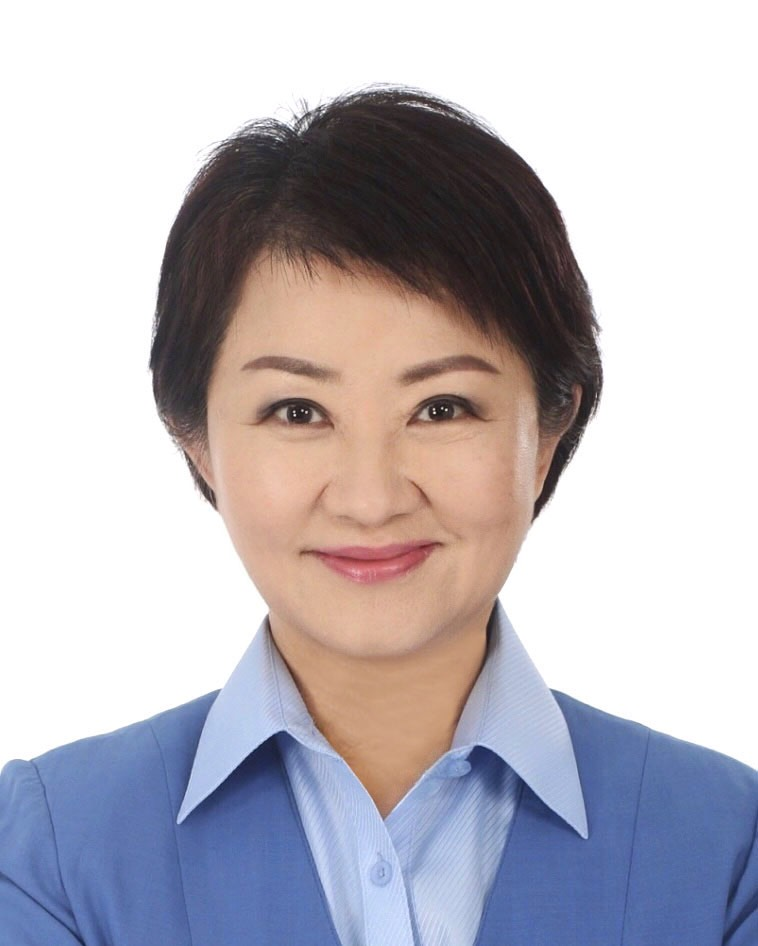
Lu Shiow-yen, the incumbent Mayor of Taichung

=== Local politics ===
Unlike Taipei in the north, which is solidly in the Pan-Blue political camp, and the southern cities of Kaohsiung and Tainan that are solidly Pan-Green, Taichung is more balanced, with the urban city center area leaning Blue and the suburban and rural areas leaning Green. In fact, both major political parties have won a mayoral election among the last four with at least 49 percent of the vote (Democratic Progressive Party in 1997 and 2014 and the Kuomintang in 2001 and 2005). Similarly, the Kuomintang majority in the city council is not as large as it is in other cities, and is only negligible when one excludes Beitun District, which is solidly pro-Kuomintang. The incumbent Mayor of Taichung is Lu Shiow-yen of the Kuomintang.

=== Government ===
Taichung City's executive branch is headed by mayor Lu Shiow-yen of the Kuomintang. Taichung's legislative branch is a unicameral 46-member City Council. Each member is elected from one of six member districts where each voter has only one vote.

== Administrative divisions ==
Taichung consists of 29 districts, 28 districts and 1 mountain indigenous district.

Labeled map of Taichung
Name	Chinese	Taiwanese	Hakka	Population (January 2023)	Area (km^{2})
Central	中區	Tiong	Chûng	17,654	0.8803
East	東區	Tang	Tûng	75,724	9.2855
South	南區	Lâm	Nàm	125,695	6.8101
West	西區	Se	Sî	112,651	5.7042
North	北區	Pak	Pet	143,018	6.9376
Beitun (Beituen)	北屯區	Pak-tūn	Pet-tun	296,757	62.7034
Xitun (Shituen)	西屯區	Se-tūn	Sî-tun	232,406	39.8467
Nantun (Nantuen)	南屯區	Lâm-tūn	Nàm-tun	178,446	31.2578
Taiping	太平區	Thài-pêng	Thai-phìn	196,327	120.7473
Dali	大里區	Tāi-lí	Thai-lî	211,768	28.8758
Wufeng (Wufong)	霧峰區	Bū-hong	Vú-fûng	64,093	98.0779
Wuri (Wurih)	烏日區	O·-ji̍t	Vû-ngit	78,343	43.4032
Fengyuan (Fongyuan)	豐原區	Hong-goân	Fûng-ngièn	163,699	41.1845
Houli	后里區	Aū-lí	Heu-lî	53,716	58.9439
Shigang (Shihgang)	石岡區	Chio̍h-kng	Sa̍k-kóng	14,166	18.2105
Dongshi (Dongshih)	東勢區	Tang-sì	Tûng-sṳ	47,789	117.4065
Xinshe (Sinshe)	新社區	Sin-siā	Sîn-sa	23,266	68.8874
Tanzi (Tanzih)	潭子區	Thâm-chú	Thâm-tsṳ́	108,790	25.8497
Daya	大雅區	Tāi-ngé	Thai-ngâ	95,419	32.4109
Shengang	神岡區	Sin-kóng	Sṳ̀n-kông	64,374	35.0445
Dajia	大甲區	Tāi-kah	Thai-kap	74,866	58.5192
Qingshui (Cingshuei)	清水區	Chheng-chúi	Tshîn-súi	89,145	64.1709
Shalu	沙鹿區	Soa-la̍k	Sâ-lu̍k	97,201	40.4604
Wuqi (Wuci)	梧棲區	Gō·-chhe	Ǹg-tshi	59,933	18.4063
Daan (Da'an)	大安區	Tāi-an	Thai-ôn	18,208	27.4045
Dadu	大肚區	Tōa-tō͘	Thai-tú	56,155	37.0024
Longjing	龍井區	Liông-chéⁿ	Liùng-tsiáng	78,012	38.0377
Waipu	外埔區	Goā-po͘	Ngoi-phû	31,256	42.4099
Heping	和平區	Hô-pêng	Fò-phìn	10,921	1037.8192

Inner Taichung refers to the eight former districts of Taichung City before the merger with Taichung County on December 25, 2010. Colors indicate statutory language status of Hakka language in the respective subdivisions. Note that Heping District is also an indigenous area of the Atayal people.

== Economy ==
Taichung is the center and the largest city in Central Taiwan. Its main industries are machinery and retail services.

Taichung is home to many industries. It has six main manufacturing industries: tool machines, mechanical components, photoelectric panels, bicycles, woodworking machinery, and aerospace manufacturing.

Taichung Industrial Park, located in Xitun District, is home to many factories, while nearby World Trade Center Taichung hosts many industrial conventions every year. Taichung is also home to the Central Taiwan Science Park, known for the many semiconductor factories located there, most notably TSMC. Some other famous companies located in Taichung included Aerospace Industrial Development Corporation, HIWIN, Largan Precision, and Pou Chen Corporation.

Taichung is also known for its bicycle manufacturing. Notable business located in Taichung include Giant Bicycles, SRAM, and TRP Brakes.

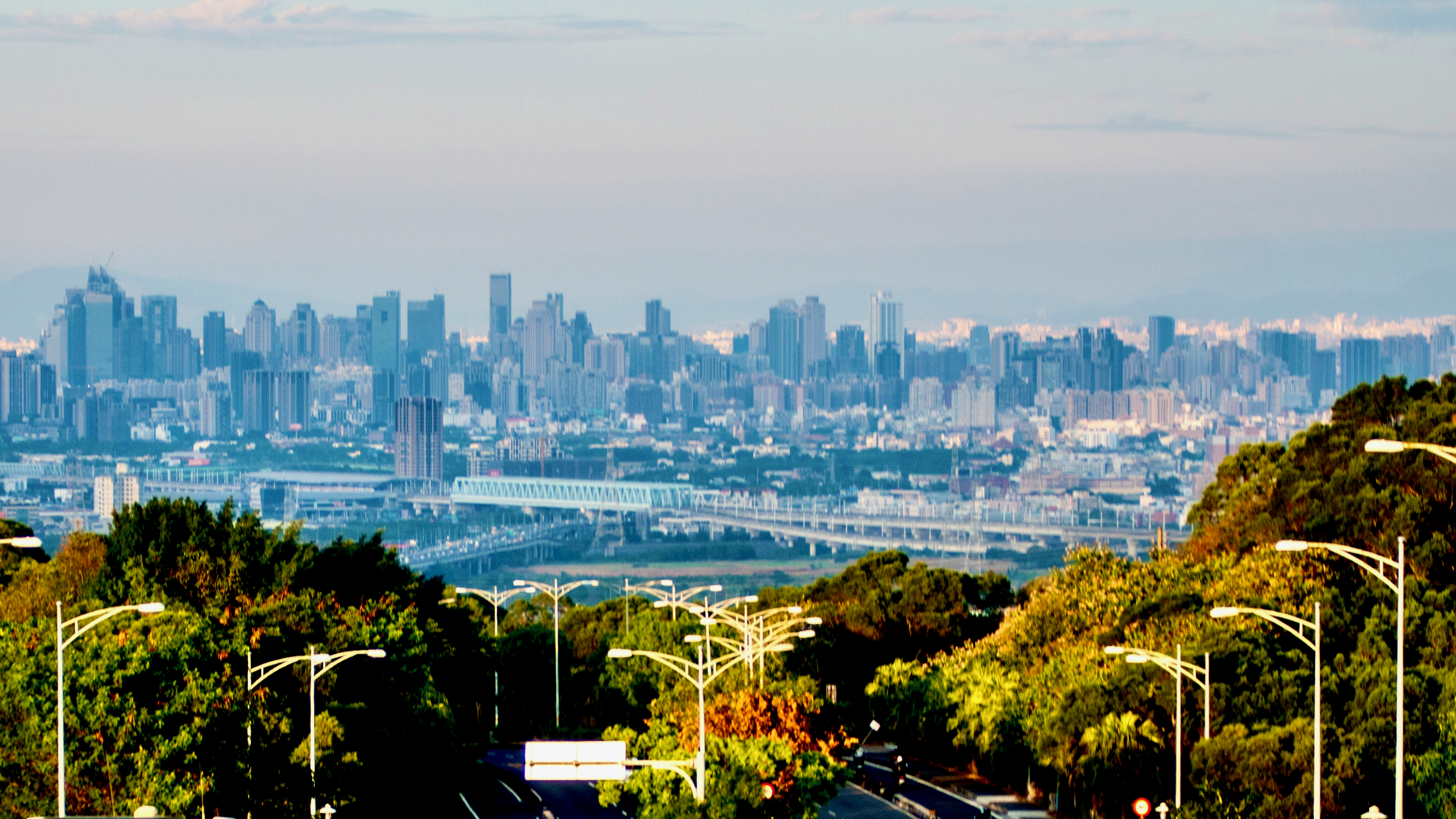
Skyline of Taichung's financial center, 7th Redevelopment Zone

Taichung's financial center and central business district is the 7th Redevelopment Zone, where many corporation offices are located. The retail sector is another main industry in Taichung. Almost a quarter of all Taichung employees work in the retail sector., Its output value is 1.3 trillion NTD, second largest after Taipei (5.8 trillion NTD) in Taiwan.

Taichung is most famous for its suncakes. Taichung's Chun Shui Tang teahouse (春水堂) is where bubble tea was invented.

Industry distribution of employed persons in Taichung
Years	1975	1980	1985	1990	1995	2000	2005	2010	2015
Primary industry（%）	35.6	32.5	27.7	9.5	7.7	5.0	3.9	3.1	3.1
Secondary industry（%）	28.3	32.4	36.5	47.6	43.5	41.0	39.1	40.0	40.1
Tertiary industry（%）	36.1	35.1	35.7	42.9	48.7	54.0	57.0	56.8	56.8

== Transportation ==
=== Rail ===
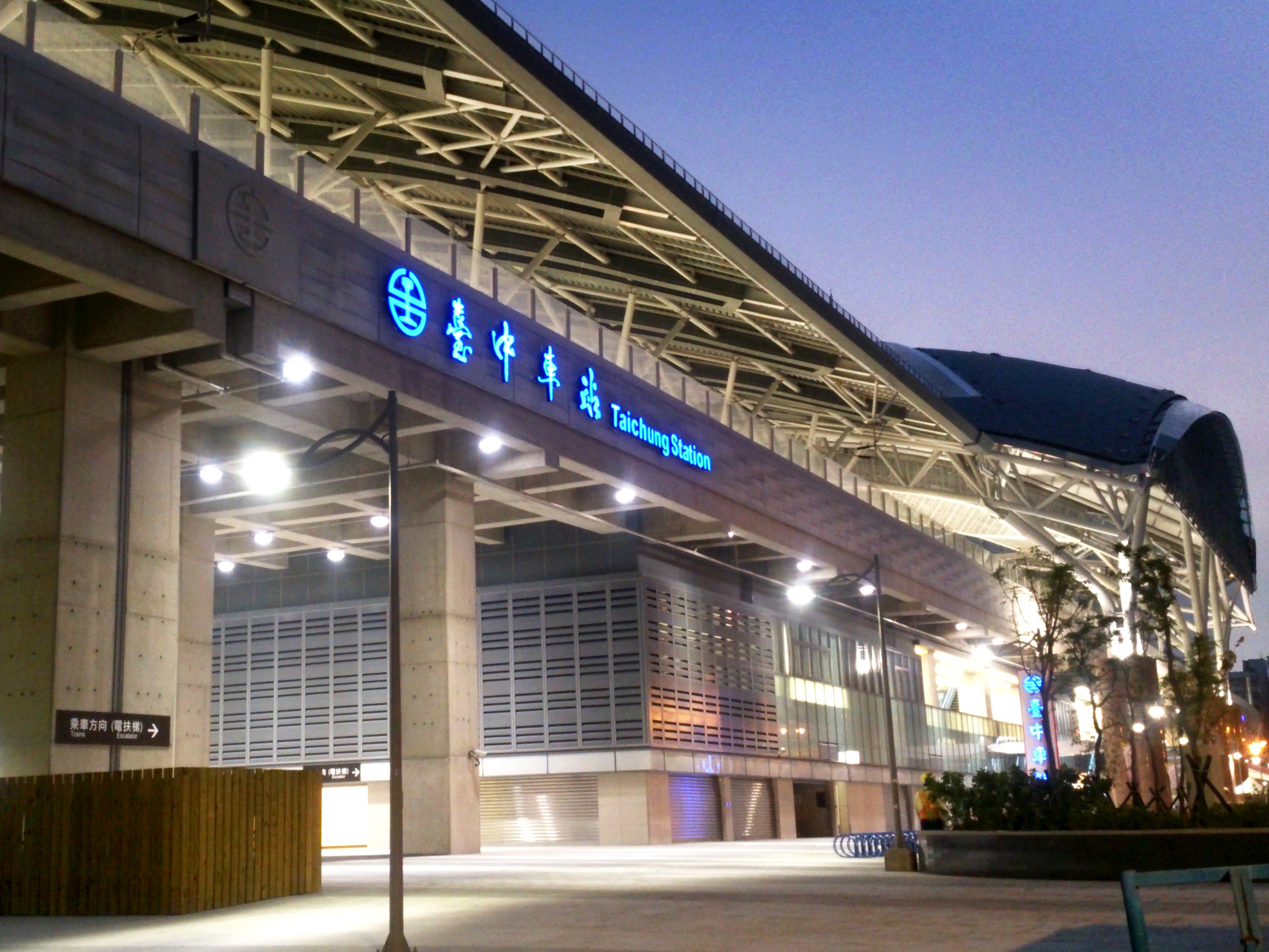
Taichung TRA Station

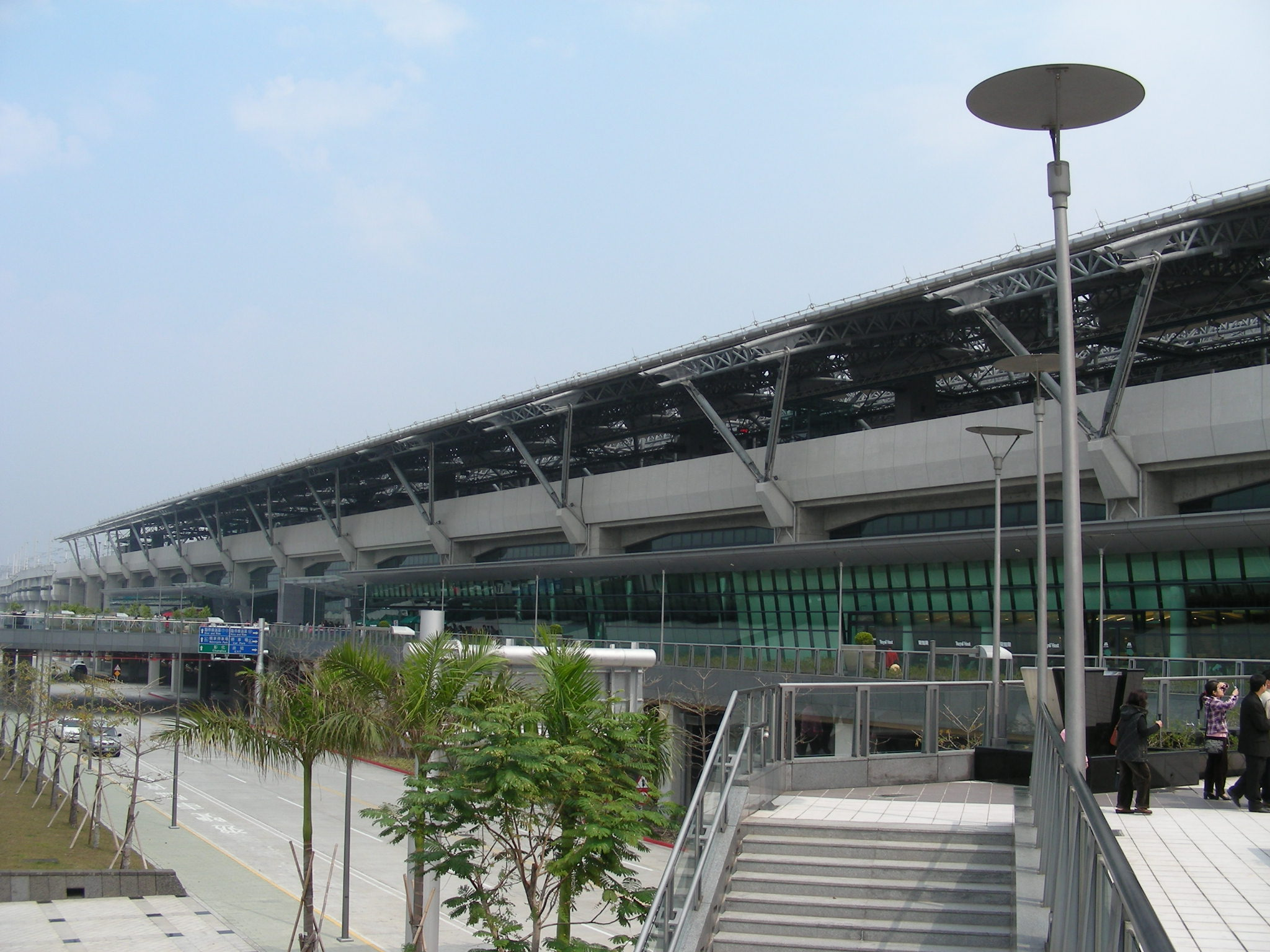
THSR Taichung Station

Two railways run parallel to each other in Taichung: the Taichung Line, which passes through the urban areas in the interior, and the West Coast Line, which passes through rural areas closer to the coastal shore. Taichung railway station is located in the heart of the city in Central District and numerous bus companies provide connections to other towns by bus.

The THSR Taichung Station is located in Wuri district, serving travel demands of both Taichung City and the northern parts of Changhua County. THSR Taichung Station is accessible by local trains and MRT Green line through Xinwuri railway station as well as free shuttle buses into the city.

=== Seaport ===
Taichung Port, located on the coast in Taichung City, is the second largest cargo facility on the island capable of handling container shipping. Despite being the second largest port on the island of Taiwan, there are no passenger ferry services available and the port is closed to unauthorized personnel.

=== Roads ===
Taichung City generally follows a radial road layout, with its center at Taichung railway station. Major roads start in Central District and run outwards, including Taiwan Boulevard, Xiangshang Road, Zhongqing Road, and Zhongshan Road.

Freeway 1 runs along the Fazi River on the outskirts of the city, while Freeway 3 runs along the Dadu River to the coastal plains on the west, where it then runs parallel to the coastline. Freeway 4 begins in Qingshui District and terminates in Fengyuan District. Highway 74, known as the Taichung Ring Expressway circles the outskirts of the city, while Highway 63, known as the Zhongtou Expressway, runs from Taichung southward to Caotun, Nantou. Many other highways run through the city.

Most road signs in the city have romanized spelling.

=== Bus ===
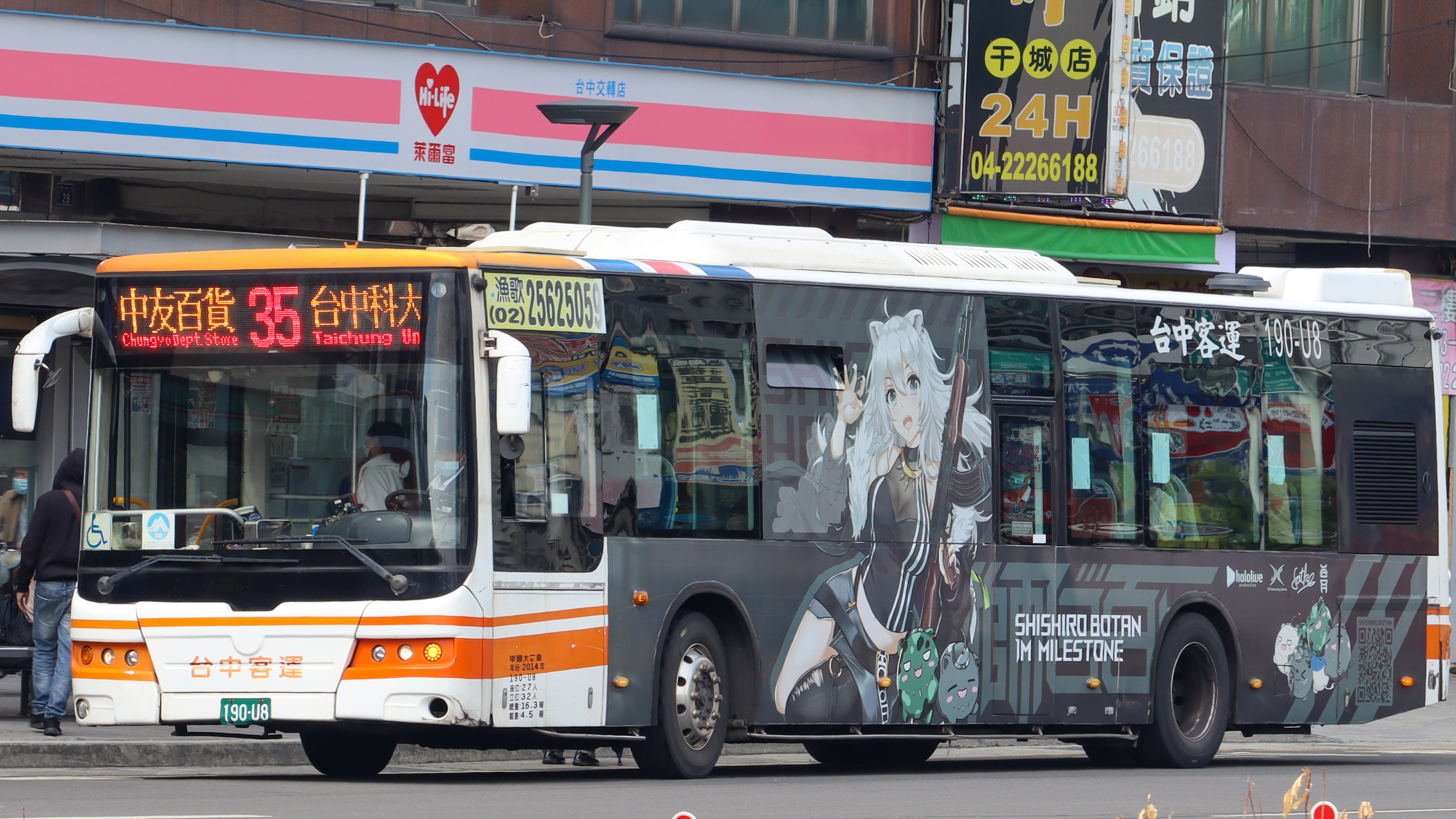
A bus stopping at Gancheng station

The most frequently used public transportation system in Taichung is by bus, with 18 bus companies providing 275 routes that cover all districts. All station names are announced in both Mandarin and English, while some also provide Hokkien pronunciations. For local passengers using a contactless smartcard (for example, an EasyCard), the first 10 kilometers are free. In addition, some taxi served as bus routes in rural areas.

=== MRT ===
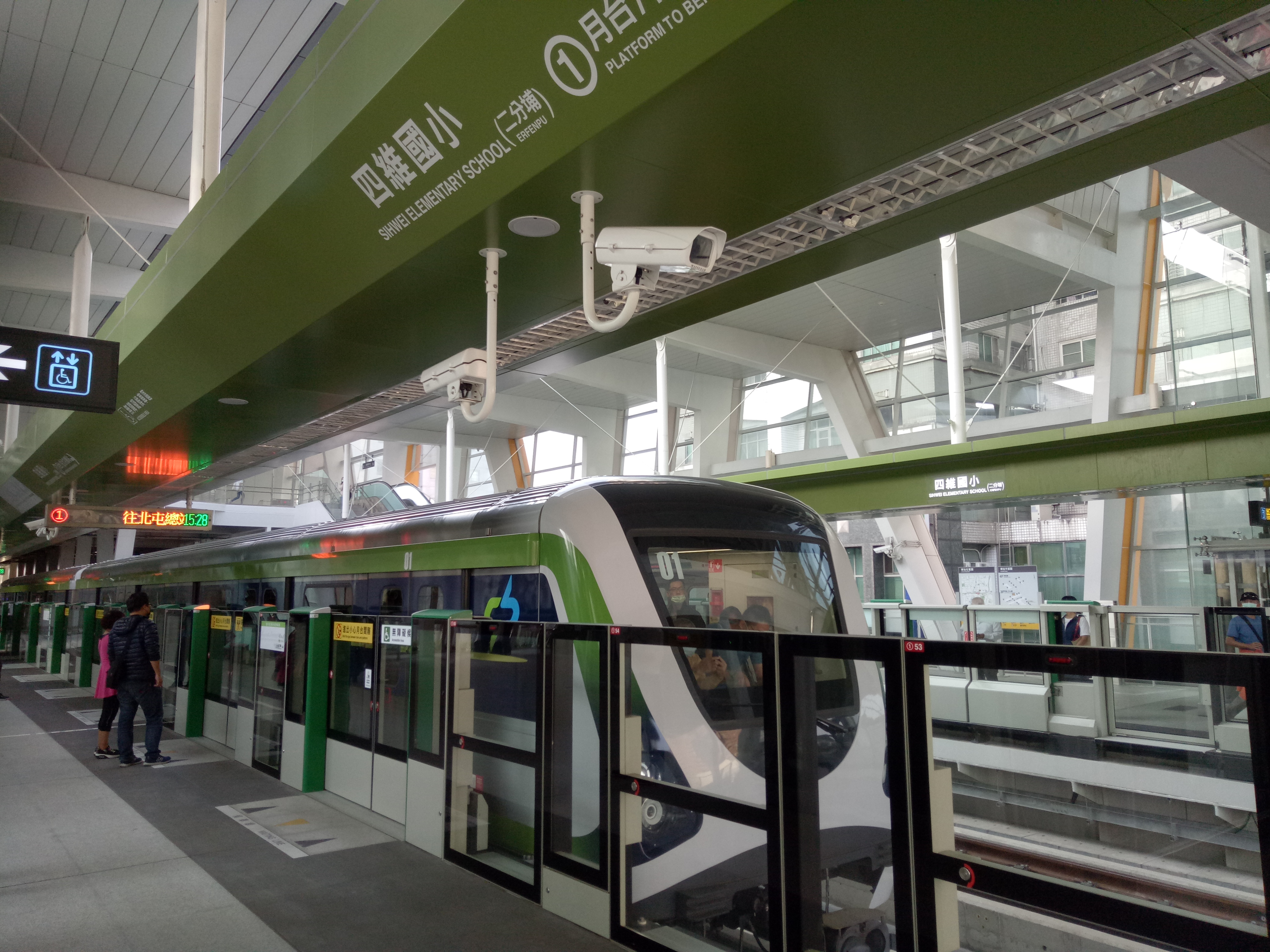
Taichung MRT Green line at Sihwei Elementary School Station

The city currently has one MRT line, the Green line, which opened on April 25, 2021. A second line, the Blue line, was approved in 2024 and is expected to open in 2034.

For a short period of time, the city operated a bus rapid transit system, named the BRT Blue Line, running down Taiwan Boulevard. It used articulated buses running a specialized lane, a first in Taiwan. The system began operation in July 2014; however, it did little to ameliorate traffic congestion, and was terminated within a year. The lane and specialized bus stops are currently used as a general bus lane, with bus lines 300-310 running through it.

=== Taichung International Airport ===
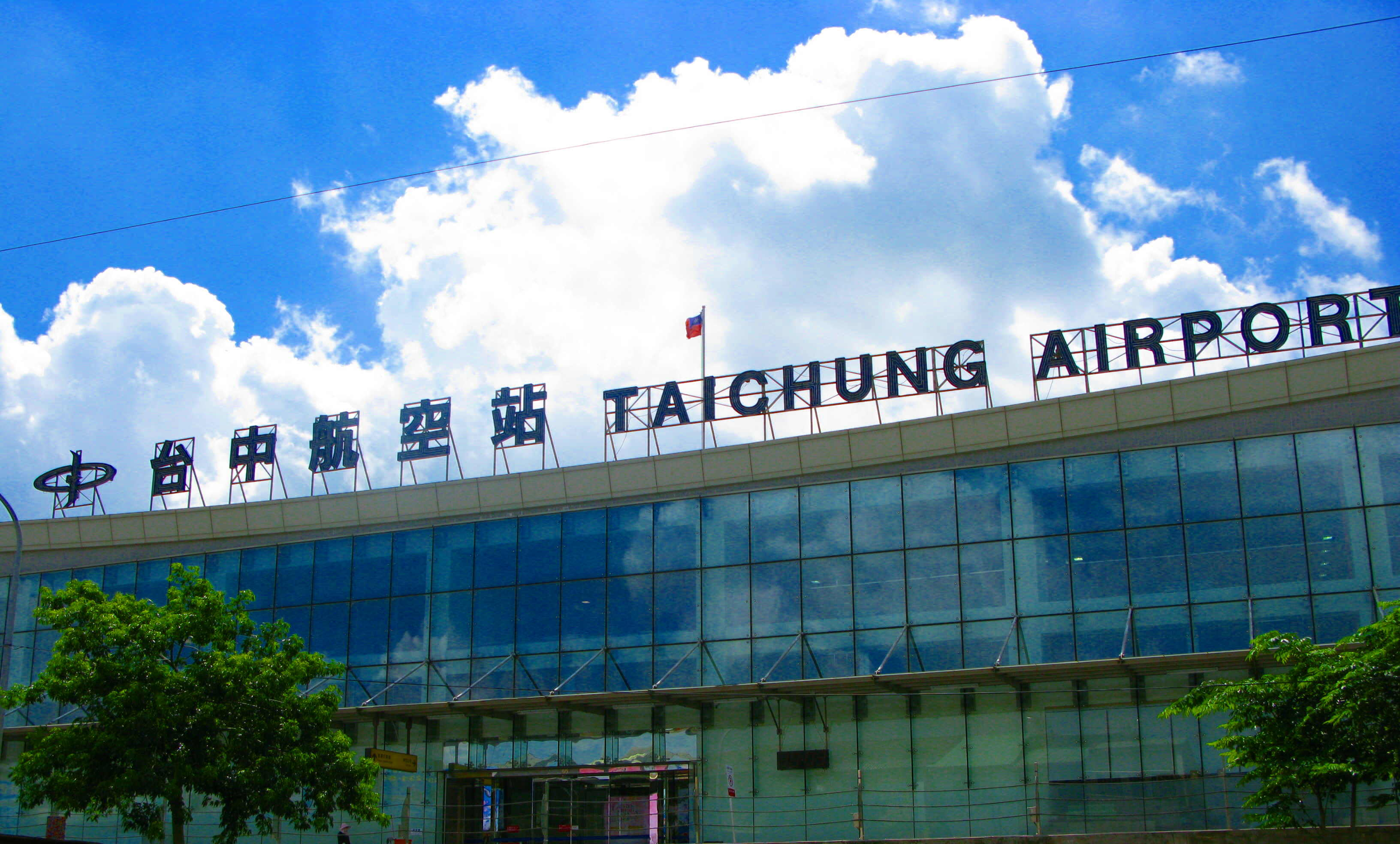
Taichung Airport, the only international airport in Central Taiwan.

Taichung International Airport is the third and newest international airport in Taiwan. It occupies the western corner of Ching Chuan Kang Air Base (CCK) and is about 20 kilometers (12 mi) from downtown Taichung City. The current airport replaced Shuinan Airport as Taichung's airport in 2004.

== Education ==
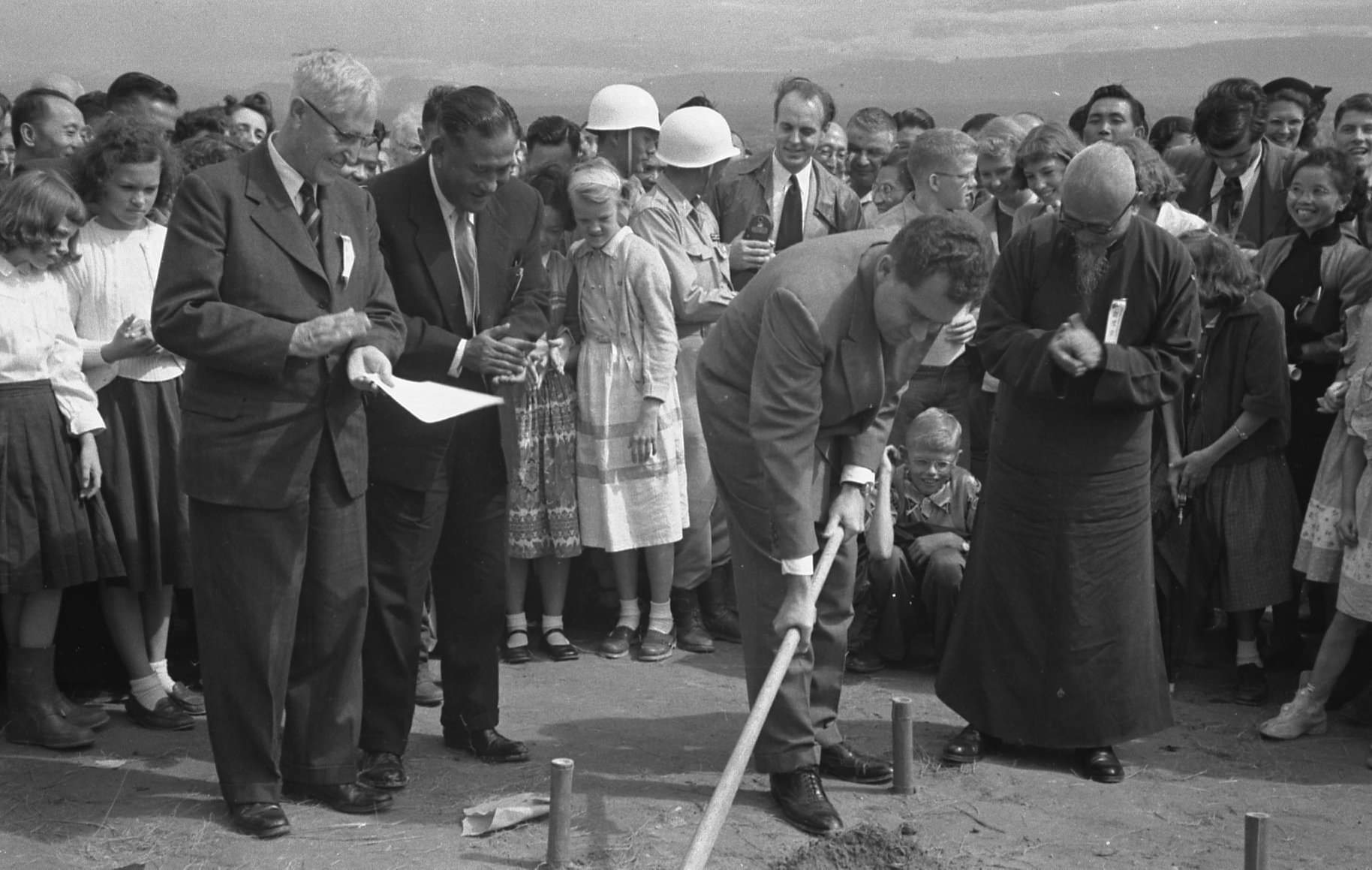
U.S. Vice President Richard Nixon presided over the groundbreaking ceremony of Tunghai University, which is the first private university in Taiwan.

In 1915, the Taichung Middle School (台灣公立台中中學校) (now Taichung Municipal Taichung First Senior High School) was established as the first school for young people in Taiwan. In 1943, the Advanced Academy of Agronomy and Forestry (now National Chung Hsing University) became an independent entity and moved to Taichung. It is the beginning of higher education in Taichung. In 1955, Tunghai University was established, becoming the first private university in Taiwan.

Currently, there are 17 universities, 50 high schools, 71 junior high schools, and 235 elementary schools in Taichung. In addition, there are four special schools, three international schools, and nine community colleges in the city.

== Romanization ==
Taichung City is in the process of implementing Hanyu Pinyin on road signs throughout the city whenever the mayor is a Nationalist. However, there are still signs displaying spellings from previously used romanization systems, as well as Tongyong Pinyin and systems that do not conform to any standard system. Unlike Taipei, which uses a capital letter at the beginning of every syllable, Taichung City uses the standard form of Hanyu Pinyin on street signs erected in recent years. However, the municipal website uses the Taipei system. Most major intersections have at least one sign containing some form of romanization. Nearly every intersection in the downtown area has signs in Hanyu Pinyin. However, outside of the downtown area, while coverage by Hanyu Pinyin signs is improving, many intersections have signs in other romanization systems (especially Wade–Giles and MPS2) or no Romanized signs at all.

== Culture and recreation ==
=== Museums and cultural centers ===
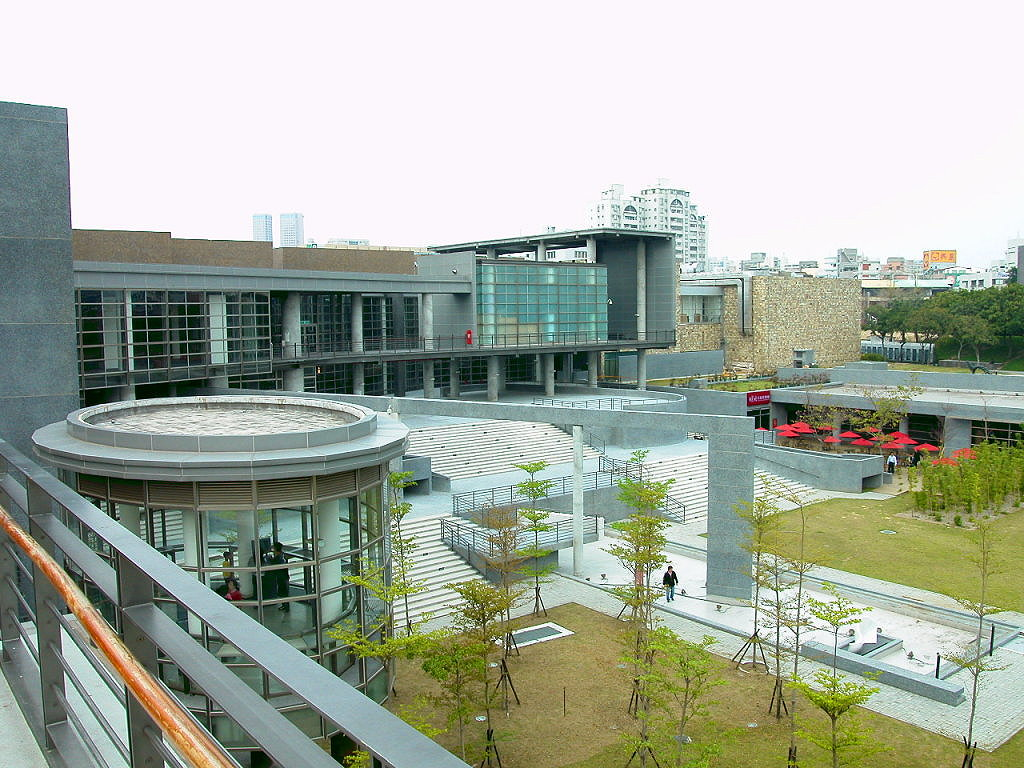
National Taiwan Museum of Fine Arts

- The National Taiwan Museum of Fine Arts houses the world's largest collection of Taiwanese art.
- National Museum of Natural Science together with National Palace Museum in Taipei and the National Science and Technology Museum in Kaohsiung are called "the Museums of Taiwan". Across 22 acres (89,000 m^{2}), the museum is a six-venue complex housing the Space IMAX Theater, Science Center, Life Science Hall, Chinese Science Hall, Global Environment Hall and the Botanical Garden, excluding the Earthquake Museum in Wufong, which is dedicated to public education on seismology, located just 10 kilometers east of the main complex of NMNS. Over 30 permanent exhibit areas cover subjects on astronomy, space science, paleontology, ecology, gems and minerals, Taiwanese Aborigines, and tropical plants. Rotating special exhibits are a constant occurrence.
- Taichung Municipal Cultural Center: The Municipal Cultural Center is located on Yingcai Road on property adjacent to the National Taiwan Museum of Fine Arts.
- Taichung Folklore Park: This park is dedicated to presenting a more traditional Taiwanese way of life. It includes a combination of authentic and recreated buildings and streets in an attempt to recreate a more rustic Taiwan.
- 921 Earthquake Museum of Taiwan: This museum is located in Wufeng District. With the rebuilding of Kwangfu Junior High on its present site, the Earthquake Memorial Museum was renamed the 921 Earthquake Museum of Taiwan on February 13, 2001. The new plan retains the original sites as a record of the damage wrought by the earthquake, and it also adds technological and educational facilities designed to inform the public and school children about earthquakes and disaster readiness.
- Asia Museum of Modern Art: This museum is located at Asia University in Wufeng District. On May 4, 2007, Dr. Tsai presented the project plan and officially invited Mr. Tadao Ando to design an art museum for Asia University. Therefore, the main purpose of inviting Tadao Ando to design the museum was to educate students and create the opportunity for them to have contact with art works from masters of international status. This museum provides various and amazing exhibitions which are related to Asian art and modern art.

=== Temples ===
Taichung has a large number of temples, many of which hold historic and cultural value. According to a 2018 survey by the city government, Taichung is home to 1,012 registered temples, of which 774 are Taoist and 208 are Buddhist.

The Goddess Mazu is one of the most popular Deity. Jenn Lann Temple is the starting point of the annual Dajia Mazu Pilgrimage, one of two largest such pilgrimages in Taiwan (along with the Baishatun Mazu Pilgrimage). Each year, worshippers carry a litter containing a statue of Mazu and travel 340 km (210 mi) on foot to Xingang, Chiayi and back. Lecheng Temple hosts a similar Eighteen Villages Pilgrimage, where the temple's "Hanxi Mazu" is paraded through 18 villages for good luck. Other notable Mazu temples include Wanhe Temple and Haotian Temple.

Confucianism is a crucial part of many Chinese cultures. In Taichung, there are two historic major temples dedicated to Wenchang Dijun, the patron deity of literature: Beitun Wenchang Temple and Nantun Wenchang Temple. The Taichung Confucian Temple is a large and relatively new complex dedicated to Confucius himself. There are also several ancestral shrines in Taichung, notably the Lin Family Ancestral Shrine, the Zhang Family Temple, and the Zhang Liao Family Temple.

Many other deities are worshipped in the city, including:

- Baosheng Dadi at Yuanbao Temple
- Guanyin at Songzhu Temple and Zi Yun Yan
- Xuantian Shangdi at Zhenwu Temple
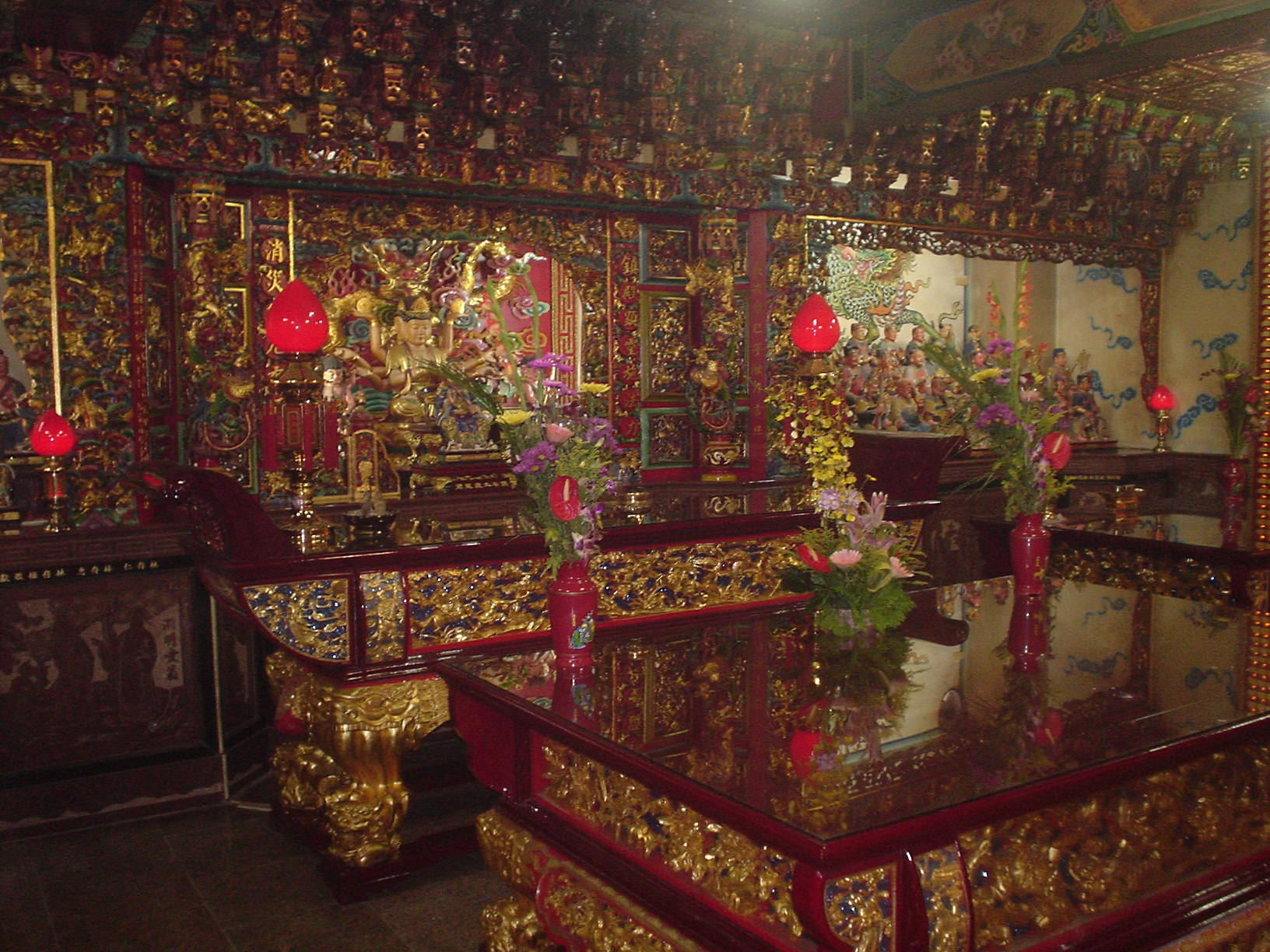
Lecheng Temple, built during the Qing dynasty

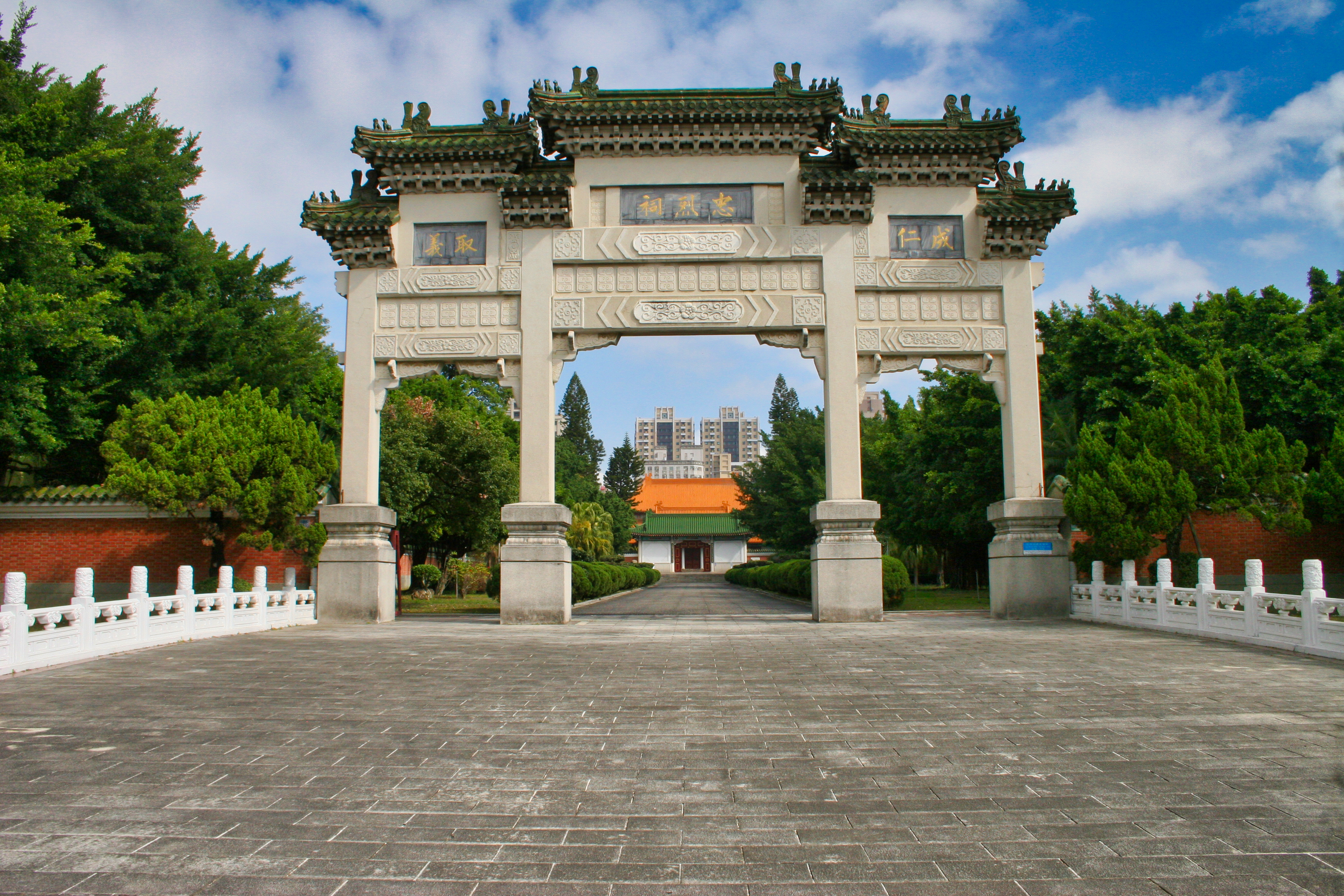
Taichung Martyrs' Shrine

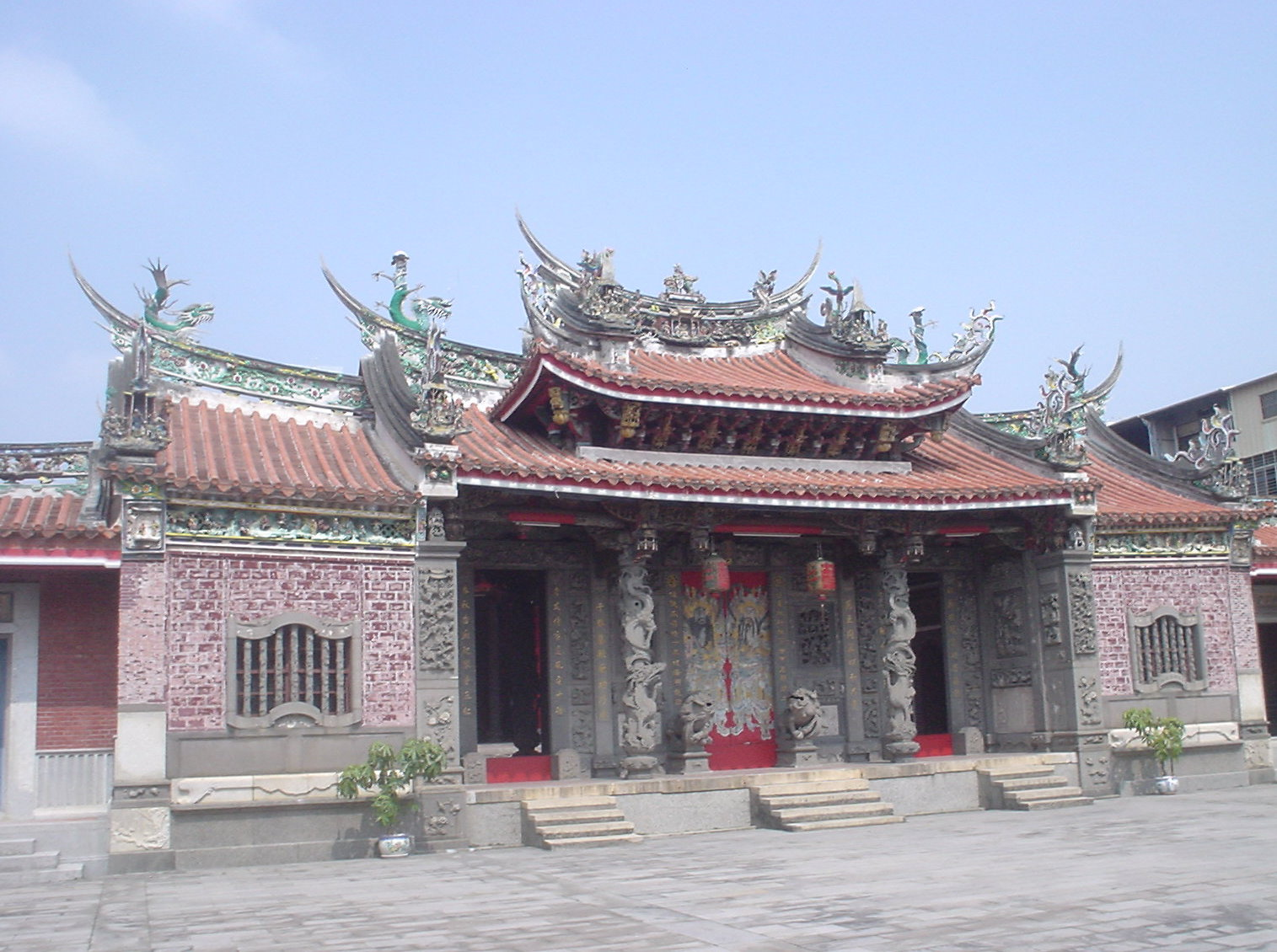
Lin Family Ancestral Shrine in South District. Built during the Qing dynasty.

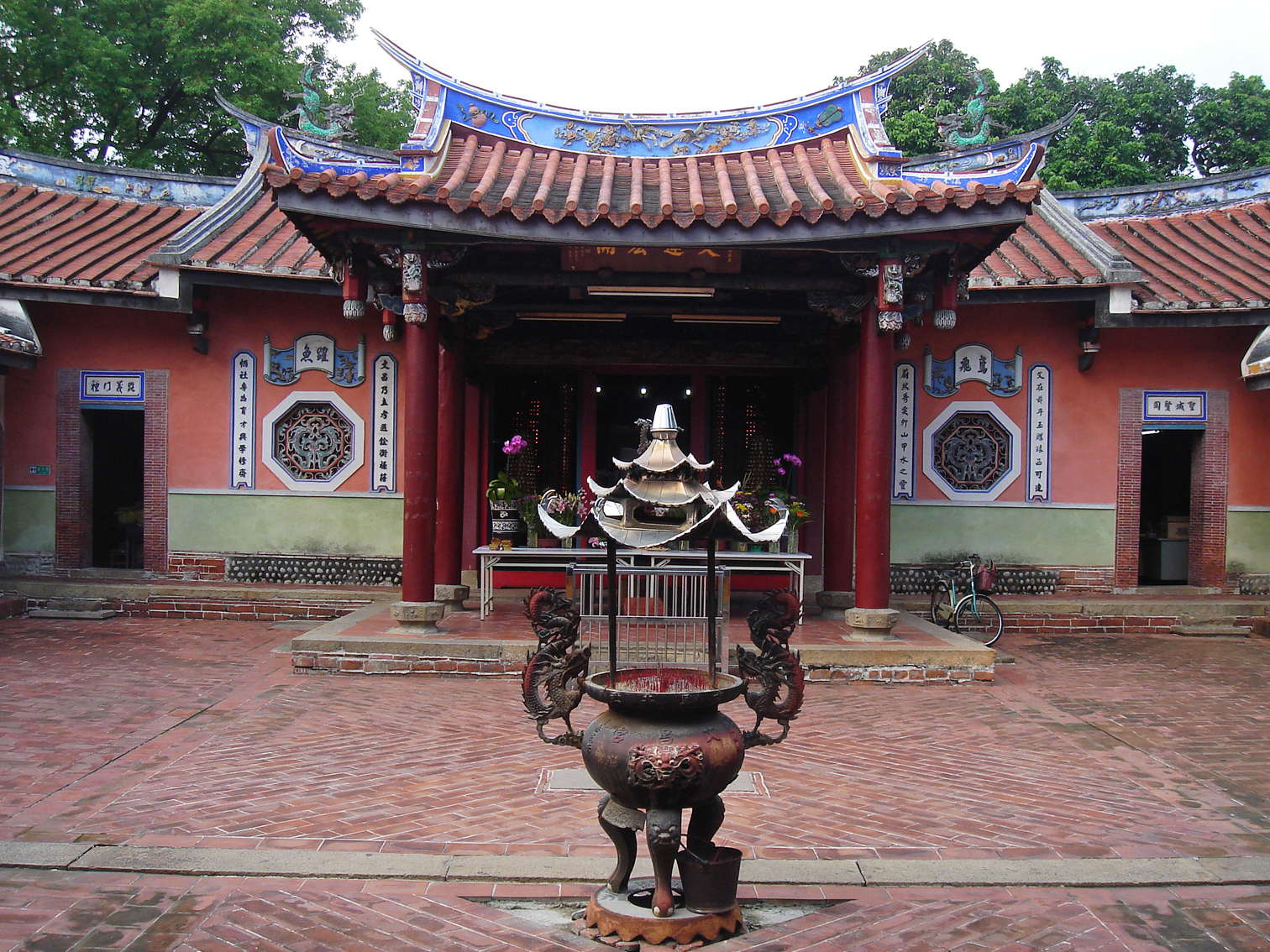
Beitun Wenchang Temple built during the Qing dynasty.

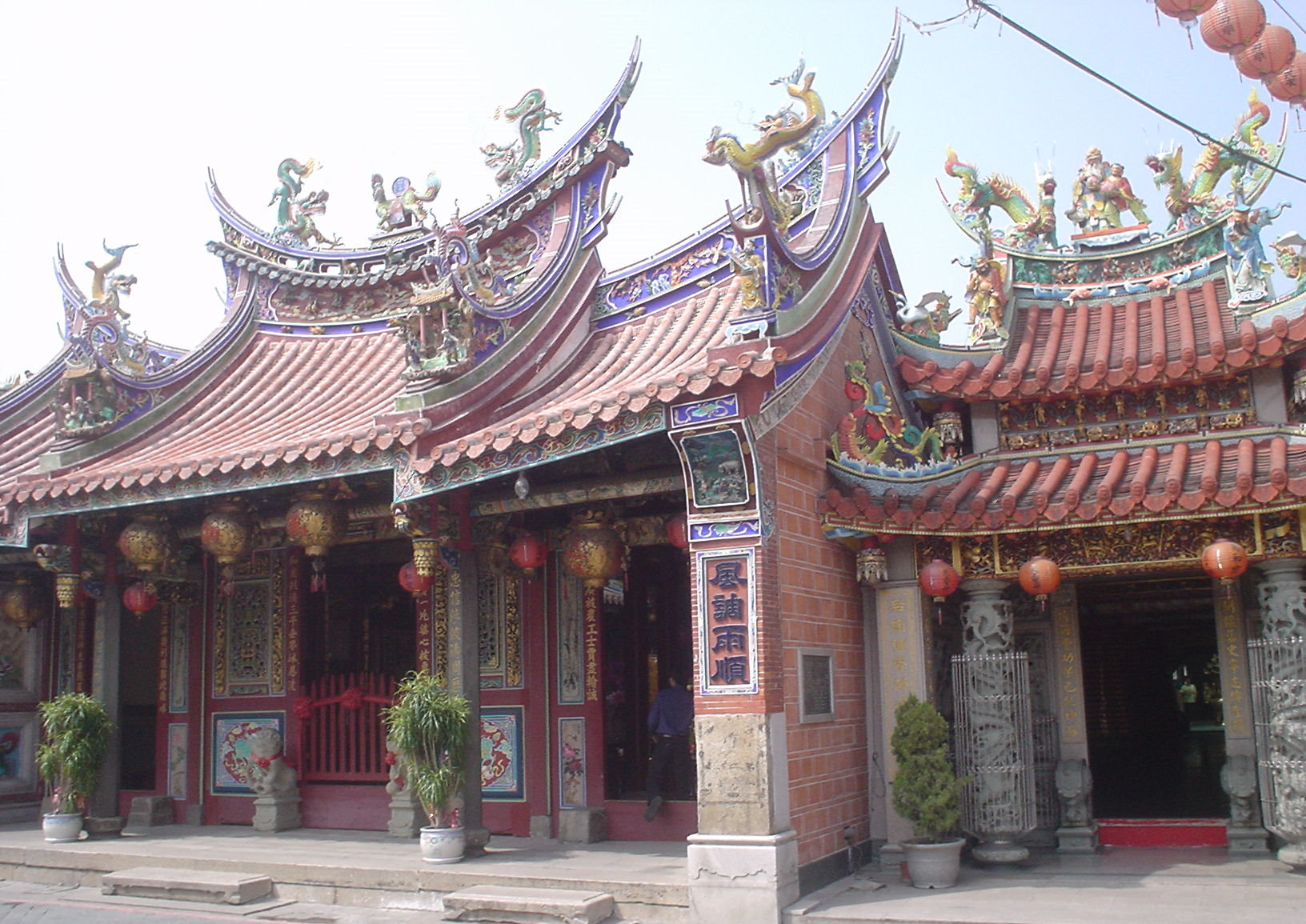
Wanhe Temple

=== Night markets ===
Taichung has several open-air night markets that feature local food and diversions:

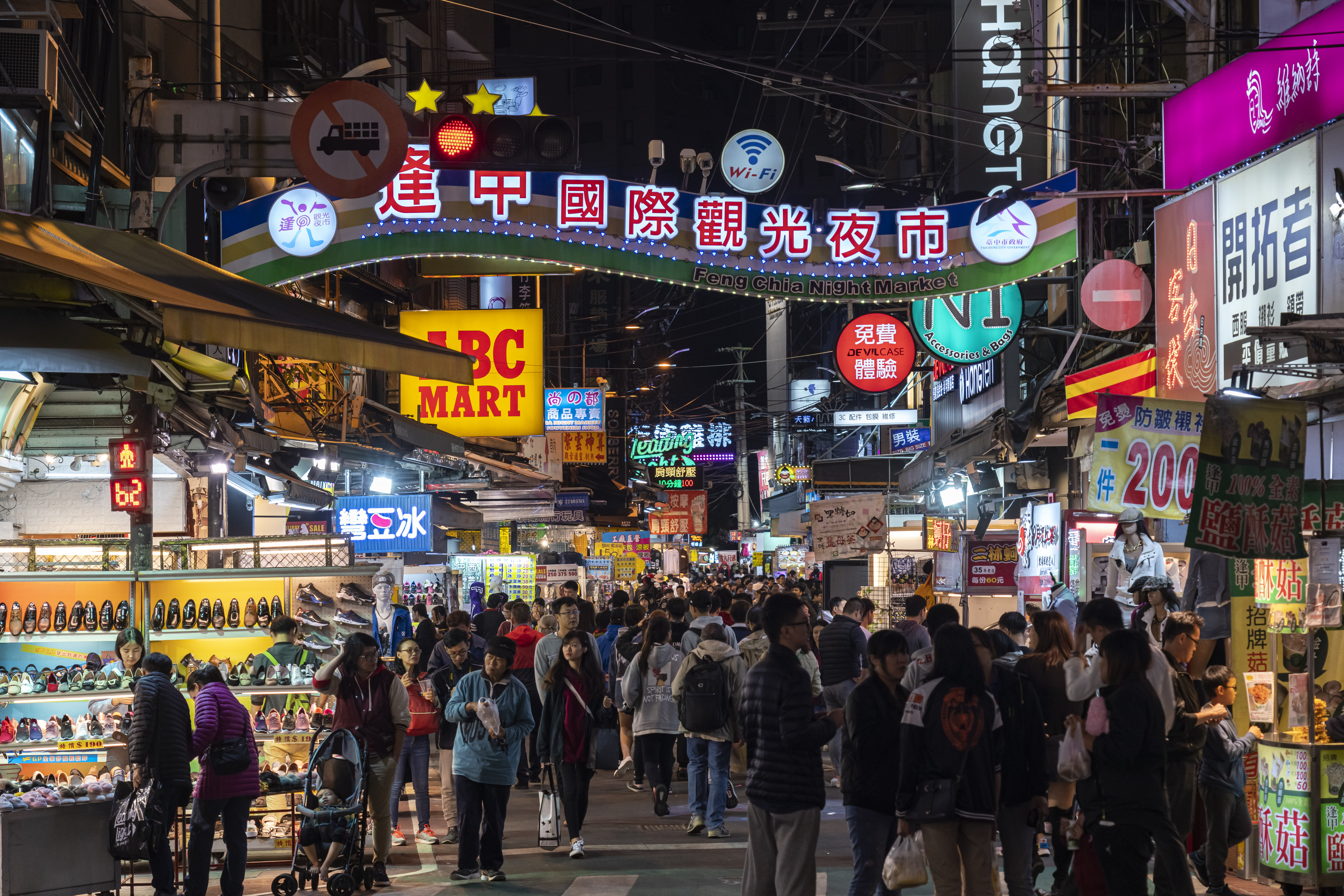
Fengjia Night Market

- Fengjia Night Market - located adjacent to Feng Chia University.
- Yizhong Street - located at North District, close to Taichung Park. One of the most popular night markets in Taichung.
- Zhonghua Night Market - located in the heart of Central District, along ZhongHua Road.
- Zhongxiao Night Market - located south of the Taichung Railroad Station around the intersections of ZhongXiao, Taichung and GuoGuang roads.
- Tunghai Night Market - located at the western side of Xitun, close to border with Longjing. A small street northwest of Tunghai University.
- Hanxi Night Market-A large night market which is located Hanxi East Road Section 1 at East District.

=== Hot springs ===
Taichung has a famous hot spring, Guguan hot spring, located in Heping District.

=== Performance venues ===
- Zhongshan Hall: Zhongshan Hall is a popular venue for a variety of performances including musical, opera, ballet, dance, theatrical, and other performances. Seating capacity is 1,692.
- Fulfillment Amphitheater: This recently completed outdoor venue is located in the Wenxin Forest Park and is suitable for a wide range of outdoor performances.*Zhongxing Hall at National Taichung Library

=== Other annual activities ===
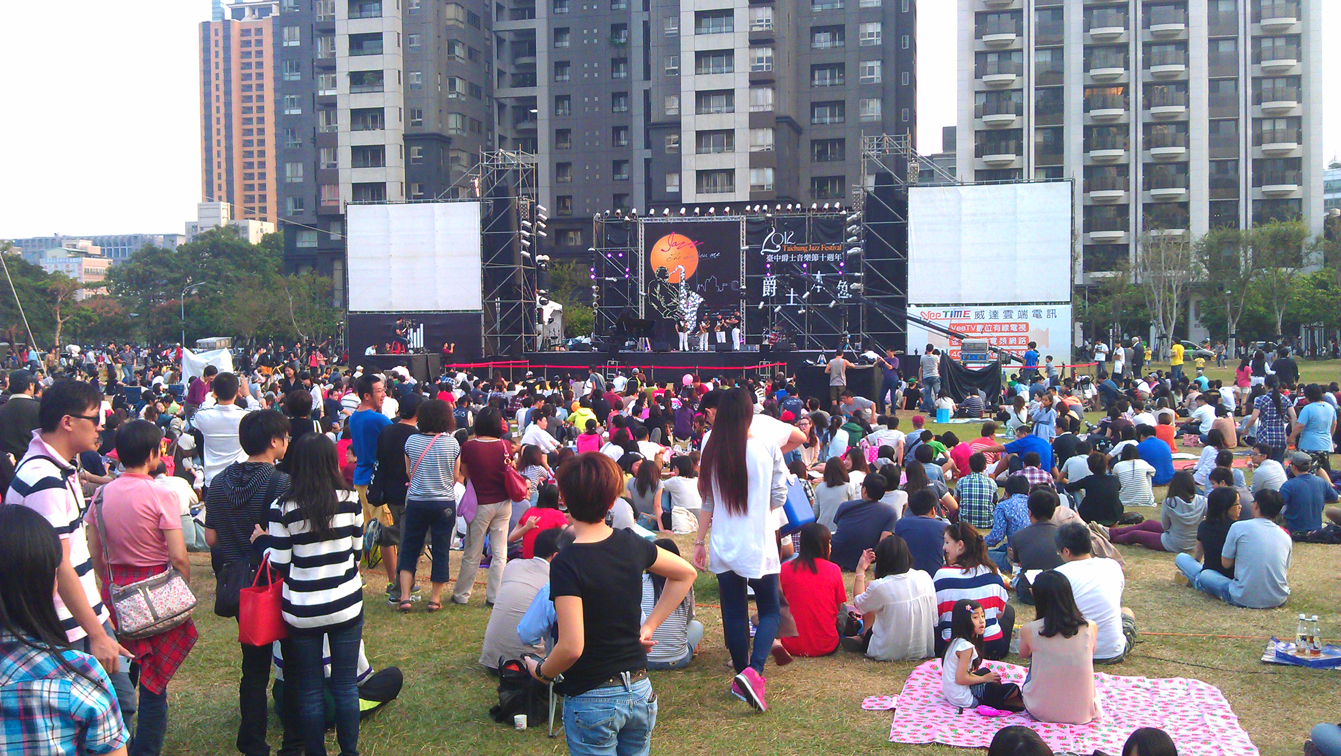
Taichung Jazz Festival

- The Taichung Jazz Festival takes place annually through the month of October. It features a variety of acts at numerous venues throughout the city.

== Sports ==
=== Professional sports ===
The Sinon Bulls was a professional baseball team playing in the four-team Chinese Professional Baseball League. While they were identified with Taichung City, many of their “home games” were played outside of the city due to the inadequacies of the old Taichung Baseball Field. The team was expected to move into the newly completed Taichung Intercontinental Baseball Stadium in 2008, but never did. At the end of the 2012 season, Sinon Corporation announced its intention to sell the team. By late December, an agreement was reached between Sinon Corporation and E-United Group, and the team was renamed EDA Rhinos and moved to Kaohsiung. The Special Force II division of the Flash Wolves esports team is known as the Taichung Flash Wolves, the team competed in the Special Force II Pro League (SF2PL) based in Taipei. Taichung is home to Taichung City FC, a club which strives to represent Taichung in soccer tournaments as well as charitable events.

In 2015, after the CTBC Holdings took ownership of the Brother Elephants and renamed the team CTBC Brothers, they made Taichung Intercontinental Baseball Stadium their home as part of Taiwan's CPBL's effort to establish home fields in all major Taiwanese cities.

The city has two men's football teams. Taichung Futuro F.C. (founded in 2016), and Taichung Rock FC (founded in 2024). Both play in the Taiwan Football Premier League. There is also the women's Taichung Blue Whale (founded in 2014), who play in the Taiwan Mulan Football League. All three teams share Xitun Football Field.

Taichung has two professional basketball teams, the Taichung Suns of the T1 League and the Formosa Taishin Dreamers of the P. League+ (shared with Changhua County).

=== Major Sporting Events ===
Cup Marathon is held on the city's streets every autumn, either in October or November. Recent major sporting events held by Taichung include:

- 2013 18U Baseball World Cup
- 2014 U-21 Baseball World Cup
- 2015 WBSC Premier12 (co-hosted with Taipei, Taoyuan, and Yunlin (Douliu))
- 2019 Asian Baseball Championship
- 2019 WBSC Premier12 (co-hosted with Taoyuan)
- 2022 U-23 Baseball World Cup (co-hosted with Taipei and Yunlin)
- 2023 World Baseball Classic (Pool A)
- 2023 U-18 Baseball World Cup (Co-hosted with Taipei)

== Hospitals ==
- China Medical University Hospital (中國醫藥大學附設醫院)
- Chung Shan Medical University Hospital (中山醫學大學附設醫院)
- Taichung Veterans Hospital (臺中榮民總醫院)
- Cheng Ching Hospital (澄清醫院)
- Jen-Ai Hospital - Dali (大里仁愛醫院)
- Jen-Ai Hospital - Taichung (臺中仁愛醫院)
- Taichung Tzu Chi General Hospital (臺中慈濟醫院)
- Taichung armed force general hospital(國軍台中總醫院)
- Asia University Hospital (亞洲大學附設醫院)

== Notable people ==
- Chen Xue, writer
- Chyi Chin, singer and songwriter
- Lin Hsien-tang, scholar and politician
- Teng Ming-Tun, artist
- Kai Wei Teng, baseball player for the San Francisco Giants
- Wang Hsin, photographer

== International relations ==
=== Sister cities ===
Taichung has signed sister city agreements with 29 cities (January 2025) since 1965. They are listed below along with the dates that the agreements were signed.

- New Haven, Connecticut, United States (March 29, 1965)
- Chungju, North Chungjeong, South Korea (November 27, 1969)
- Santa Cruz de la Sierra, Bolivia (November 21, 1978)
- Tucson, Arizona, United States (August 31, 1979)
- Baton Rouge, Louisiana, United States (April 18, 1980)
- Cheyenne, Wyoming, United States (October 8, 1981)
- Winnipeg, Manitoba, Canada (April 2, 1982)
- Contra Costa County, California, United States (March 31, 1983)
- San Diego, California, United States (November 19, 1983)
- Pietermaritzburg, KwaZulu-Natal, South Africa (December 9, 1983)
- Reno, Nevada, United States (October 8, 1985)
- Sumter County, South Carolina, United States (June 5, 1986)
- Austin, Texas, United States (September 22, 1986)
- Manchester, New Hampshire, United States (May 8, 1989)
- Mexicali, Baja California, Mexico (September 21, 1989)
- Guadalajara, Jalisco, Mexico (September 24, 1989)
- Montgomery County, Ohio, United States (October 15, 1990)
- North Shore City (December 17, 1996) (Note: Former North Shore City merged with Auckland on November 1, 2010.)/Auckland (October 14, 2012), New Zealand
- Nassau County, New York, United States (September 4, 1997)
- Tacoma, Washington, United States (July 19, 2000)
- Kwajalein Atoll, Marshall Islands (July 19, 2002)
- San Pedro Sula, Honduras (October 28, 2003)
- Makati, Metro Manila, Philippines (July 27, 2004)
- Columbus, Georgia, United States (November 11, 2007)
- Columbia, South Carolina, United States (March 12, 2014)
- Gwangyang, South Jeolla, South Korea (November 14, 2017)
- Petah Tikva, Central, Israel (February 14, 2018)
- Ulaangom, Mongolia (November 4, 2018)
- Guam, United States (February 23, 2022)
- Melekeok State, Palau (October 11, 2024)
- Miyazaki Prefecture, Japan (December 12, 2024)

=== Friendship cities ===
Aside from sister cities, Taichung has signed 14 friendship cities and one sightseeing friendship city (Nagoya) as of January 2025. They are listed below along with the dates that the agreements were signed.

- Burnaby, British Columbia, Canada (May 22, 2009)
- Gunma Prefecture, Japan (April 28, 2016)
- Oita Prefecture, Japan (September 8, 2016)
- Cupertino, California, United States (October 31, 2016)
- Hirakawa, Aomori, Japan (December 14, 2016)
- Aomori Prefecture, Japan (December 14, 2016)
- Ehime Prefecture, Japan (June 1, 2017)
- Boise, Idaho, United States (August 14, 2017)
- Onomichi, Hiroshima, Japan (September 29, 2017)
- Gwangyang, South Jeolla, South Korea (November 14, 2017)
- Changwon, South Gyeongsang, South Korea (April 11, 2018)
- Yamagata Prefecture, Japan (May 29, 2018)
- Tottori Prefecture, Japan (November 2, 2018)
- Nagoya, Aichi, Japan (October 25, 2019)

== Gallery ==
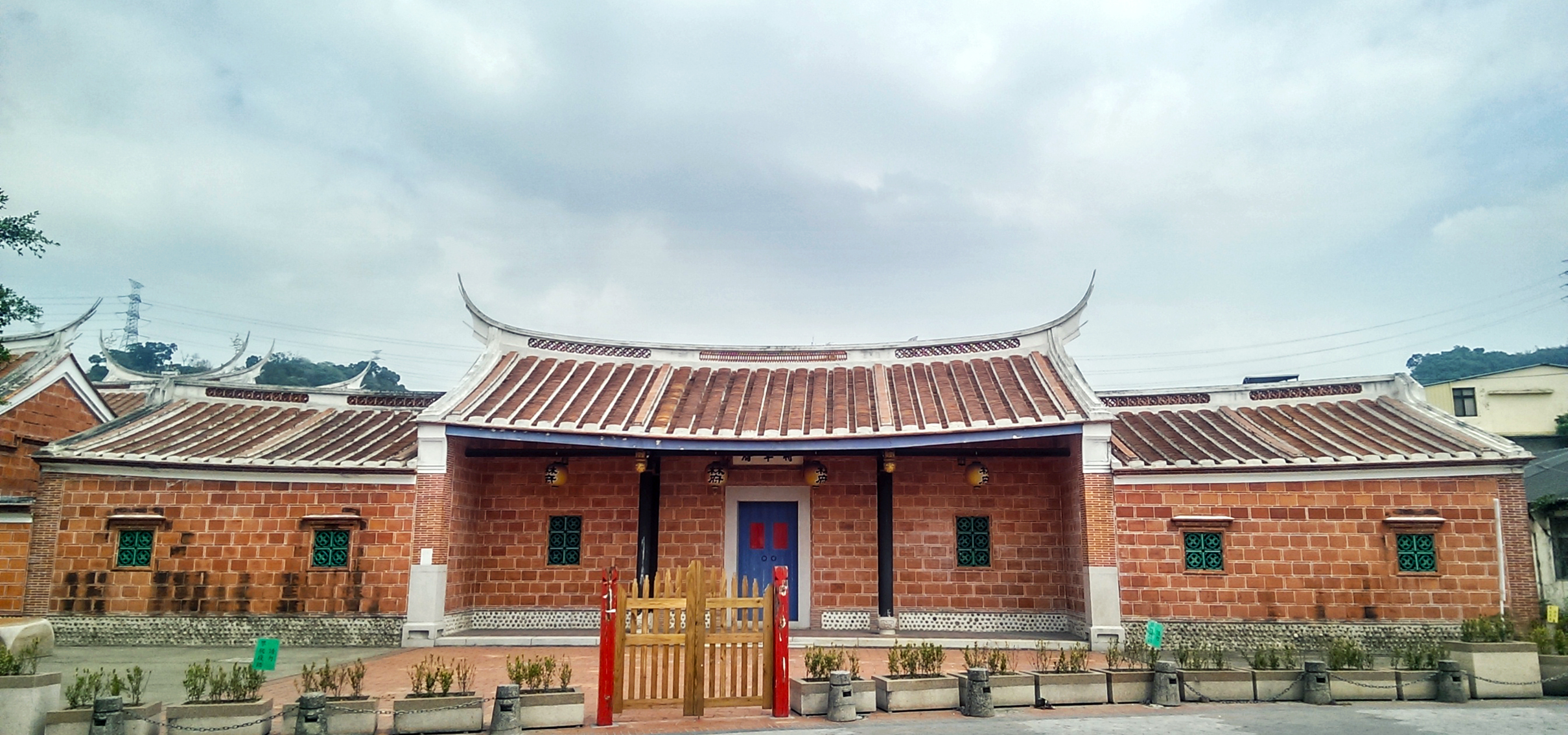
Taichung Lin Family Mansion

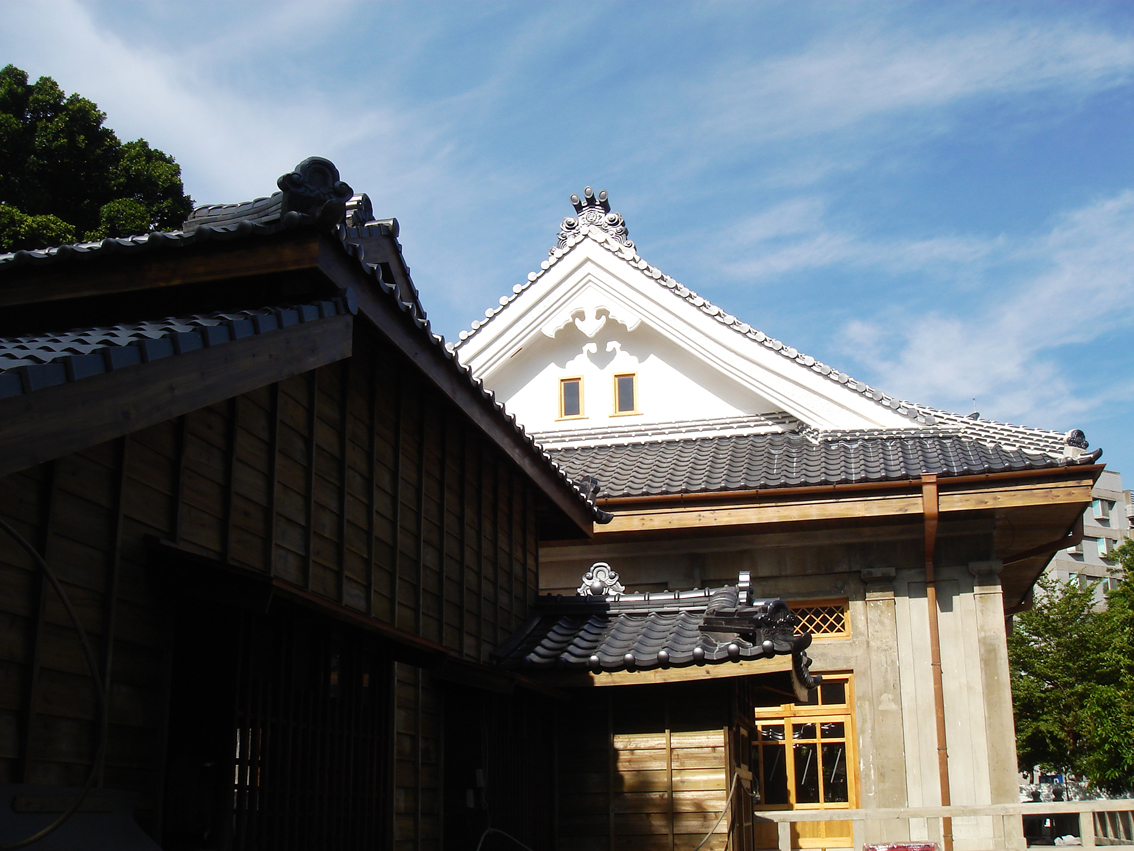
Taichung Natural Way Six Arts Cultural Center

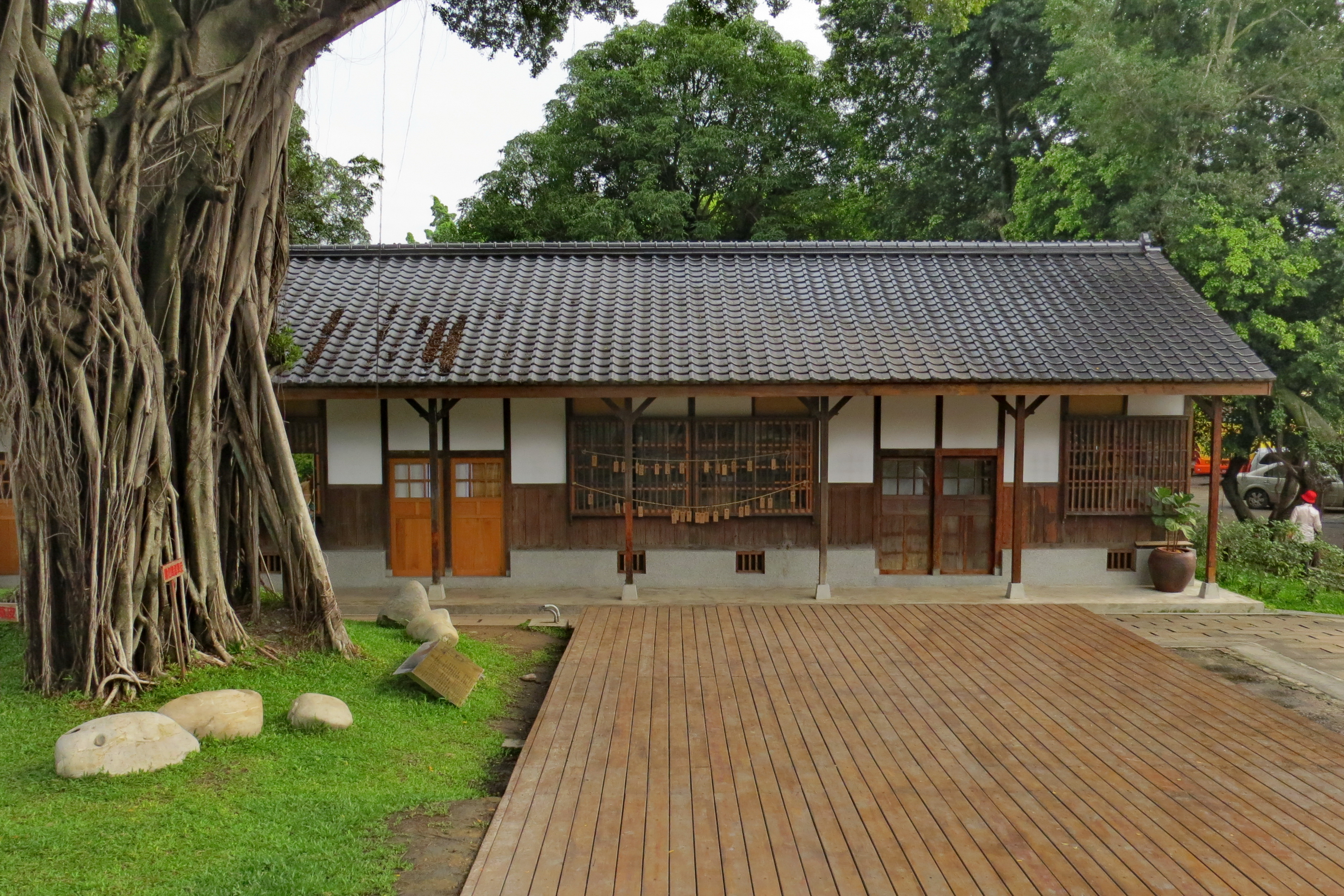
Natural Way Six Arts Cultural Center

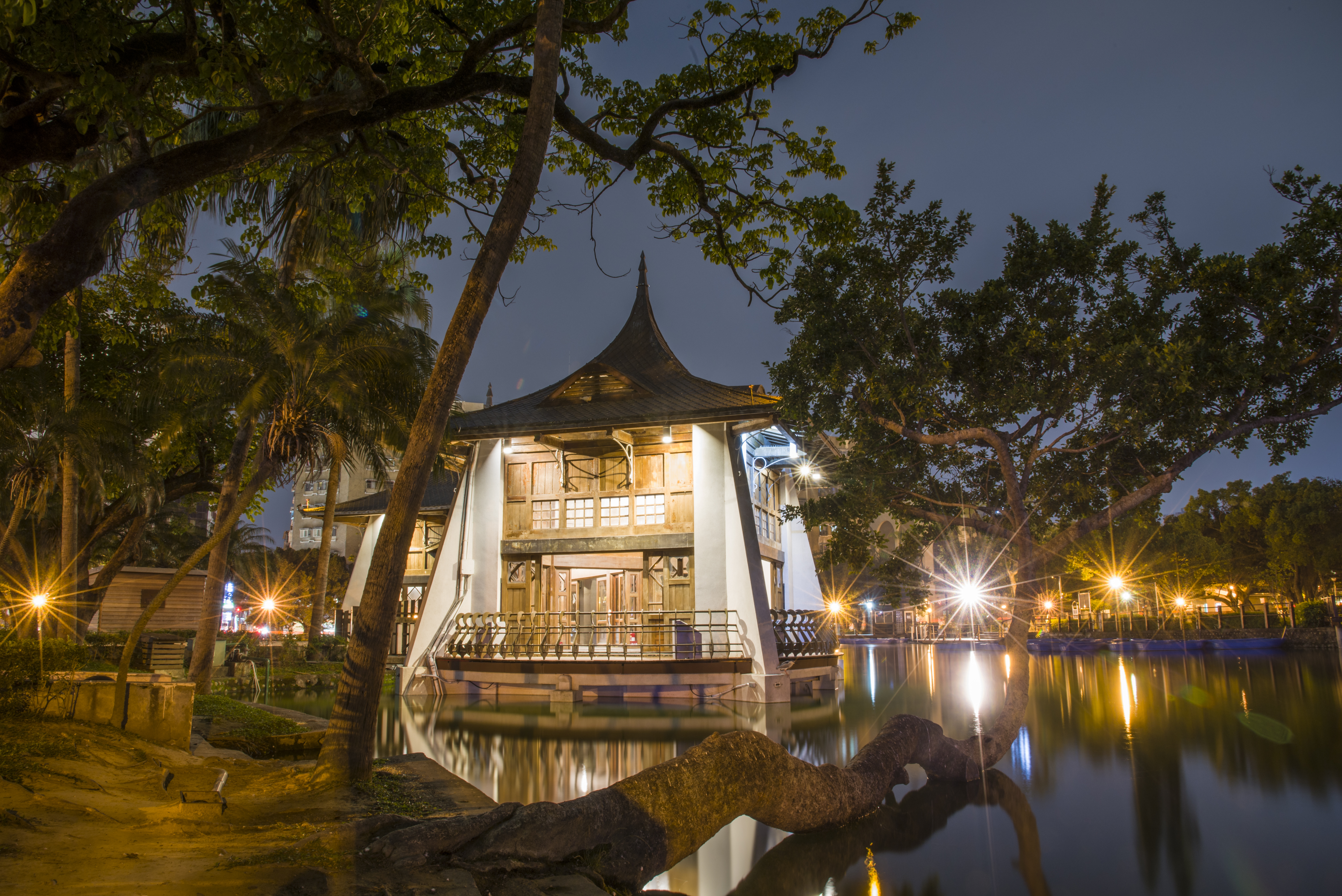
Taichung Park

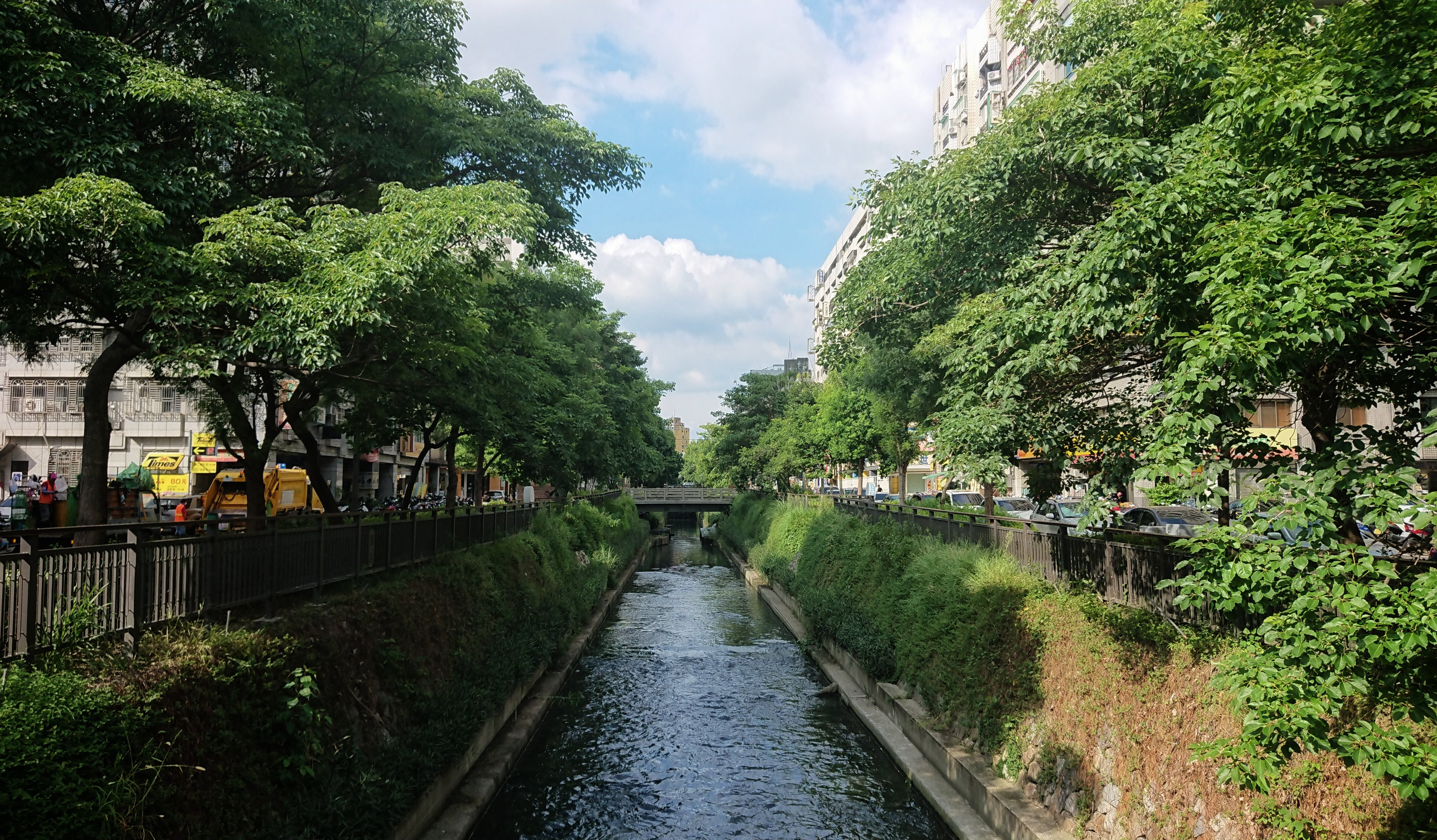
Taichung Lu Chuan canal

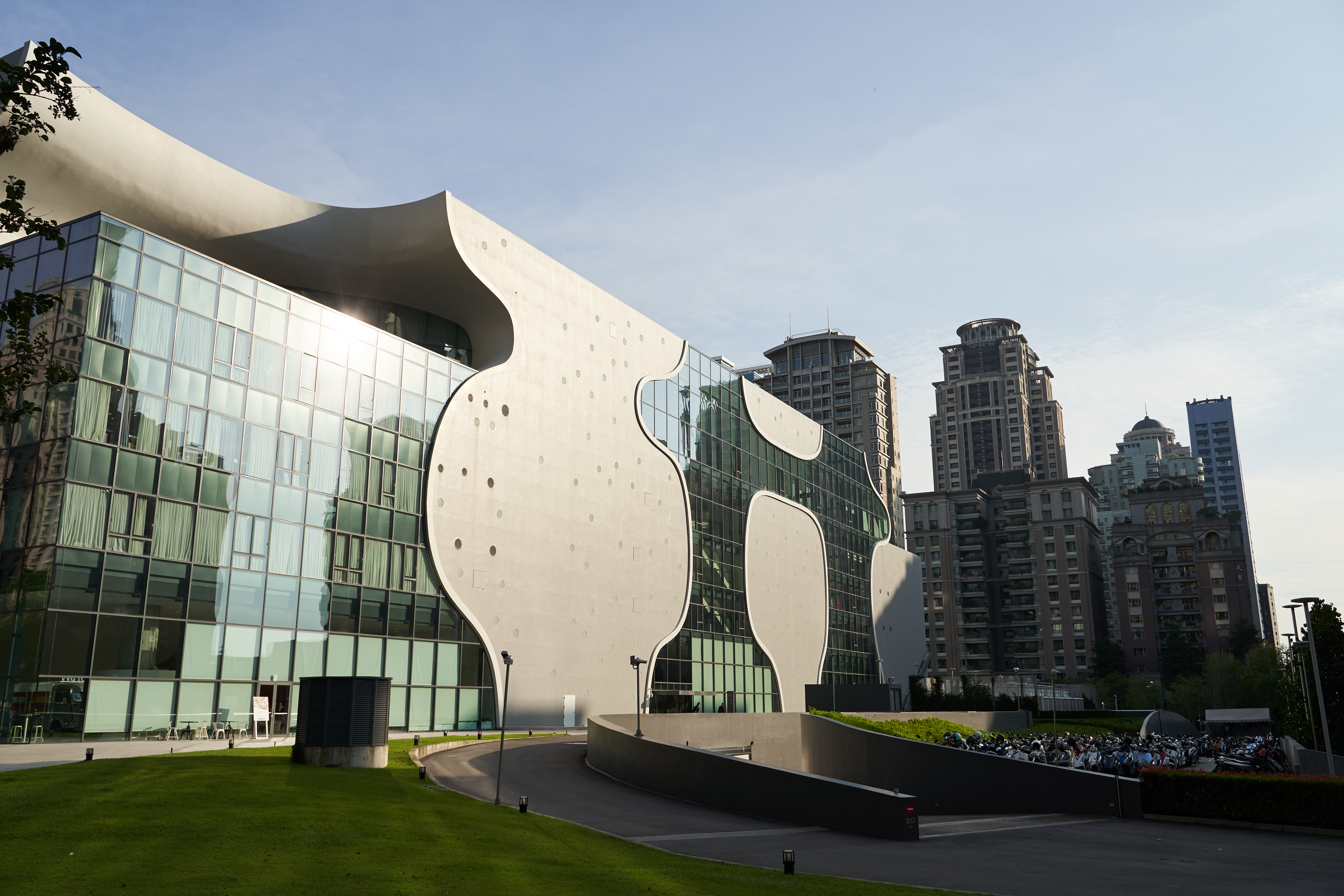
National Taichung Theater

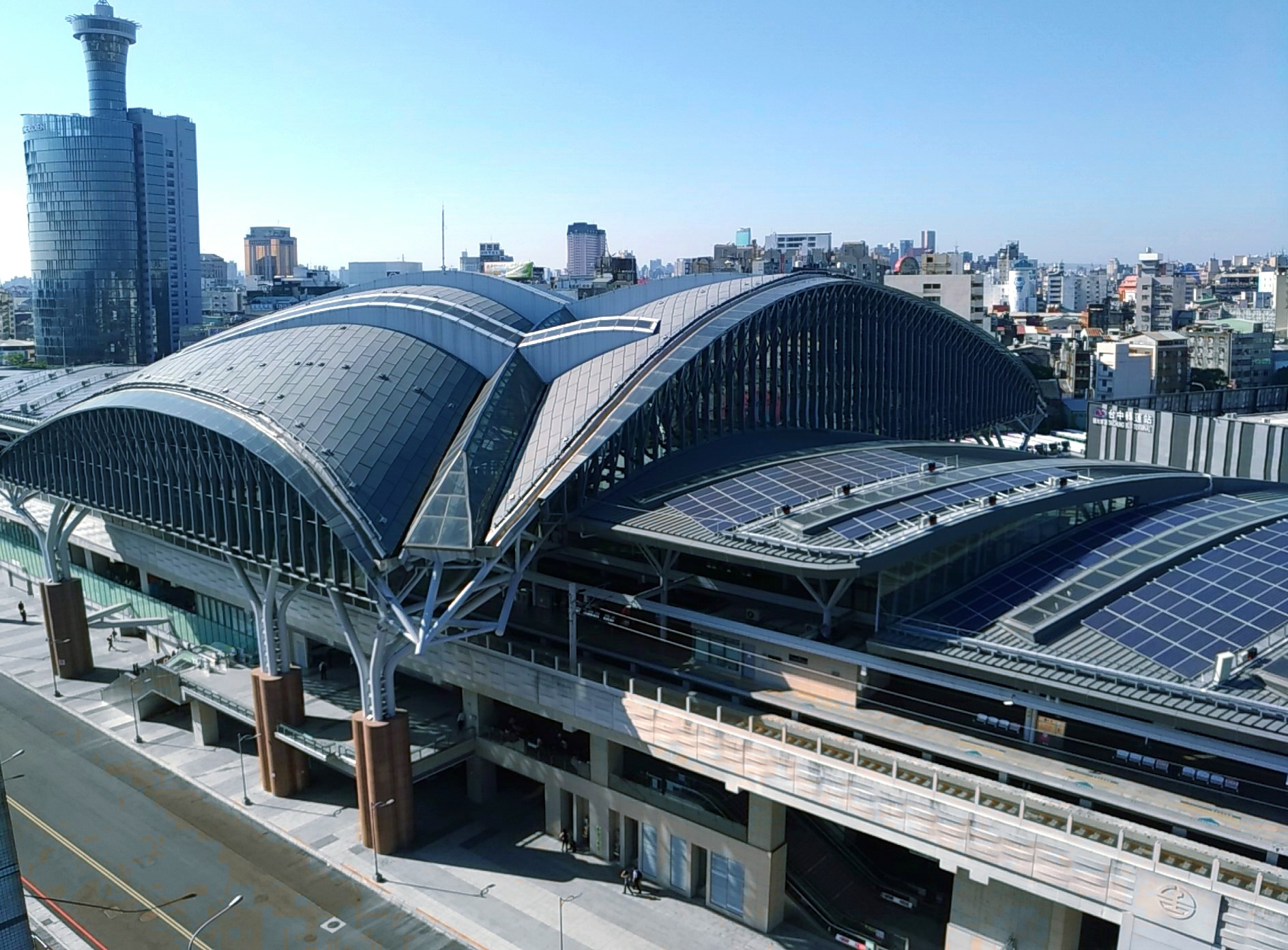
New Taichung Main Station

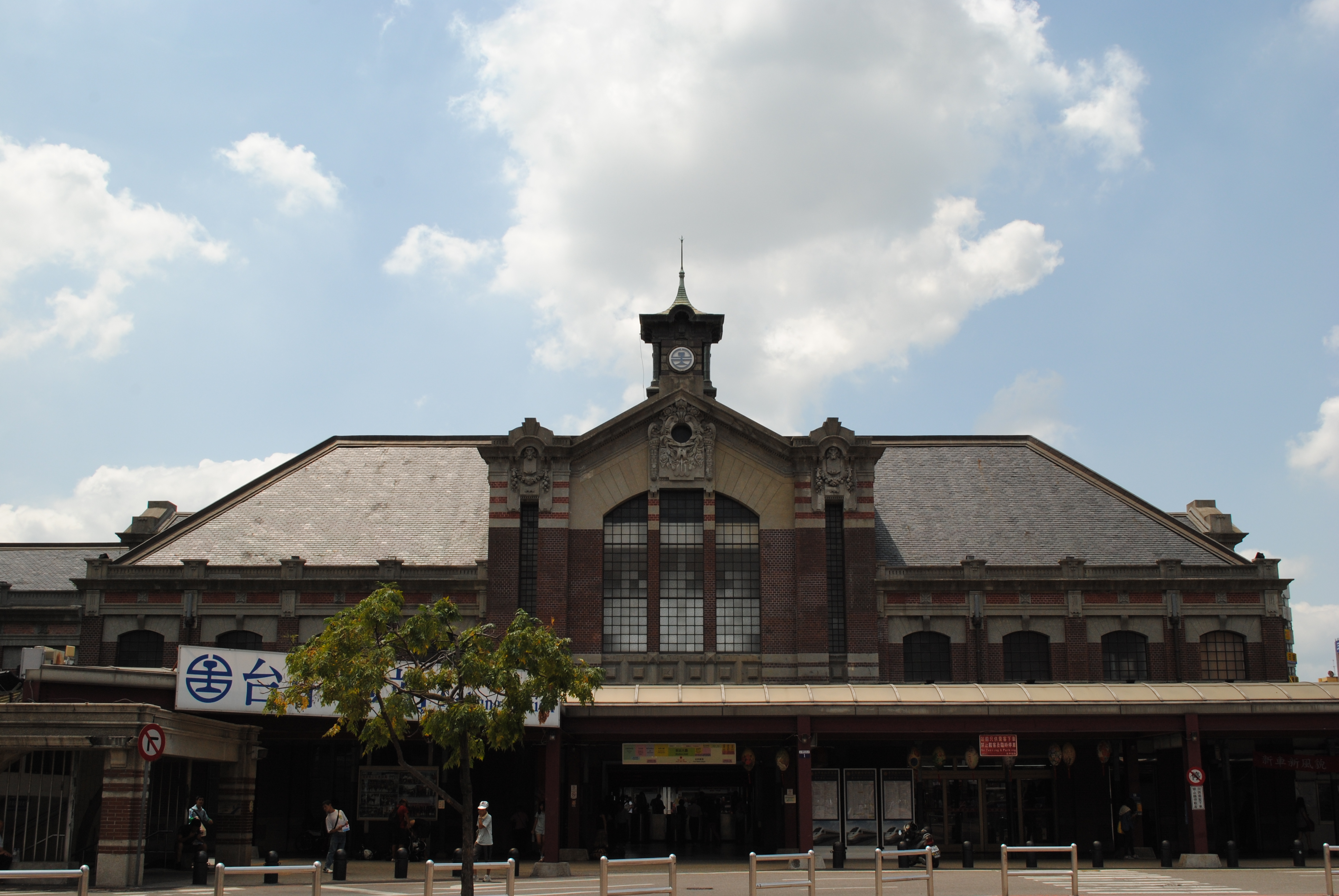
Old Taichung Station

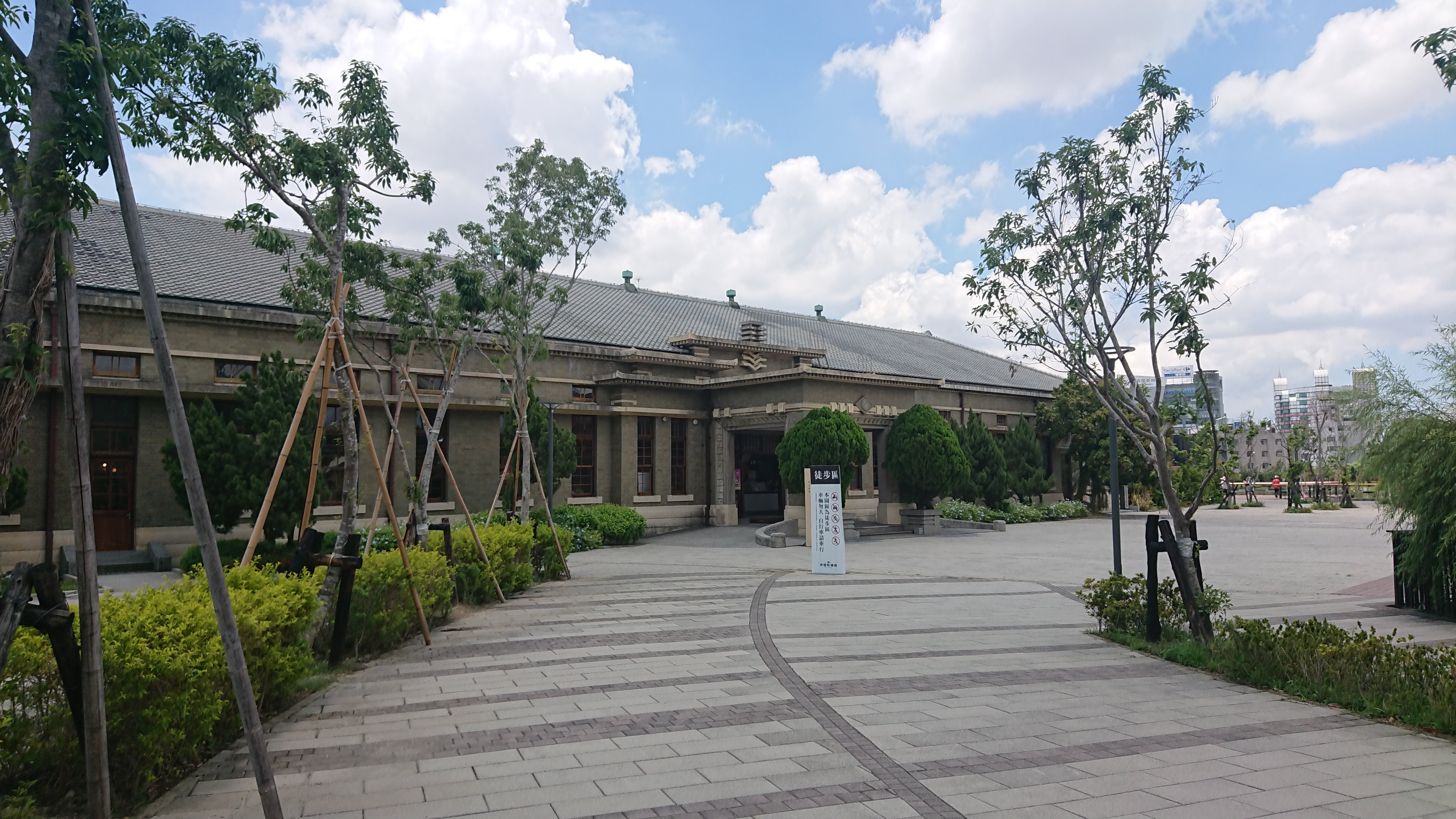
The Imperial Sugar Factory

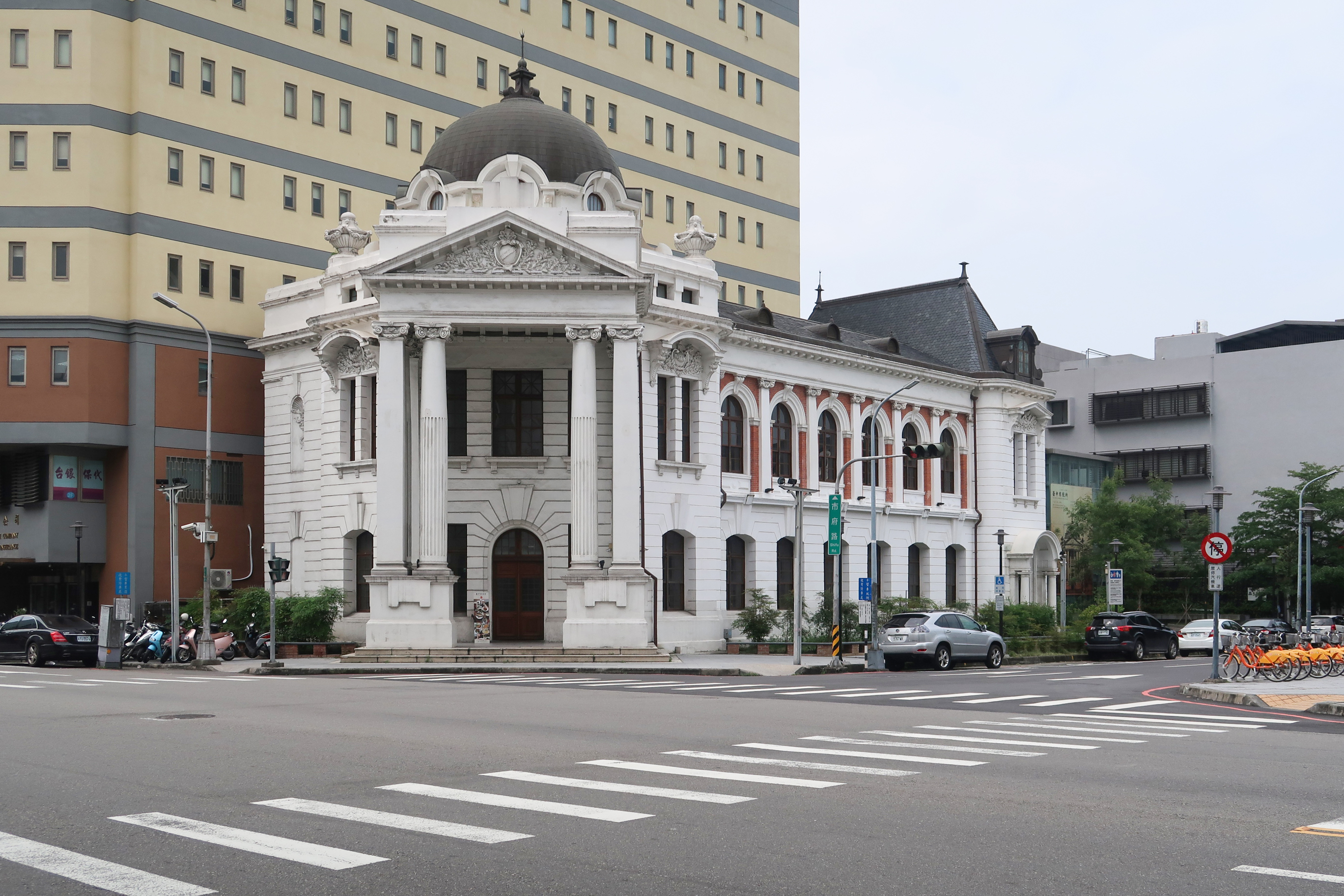
Taichung Shiyakusho

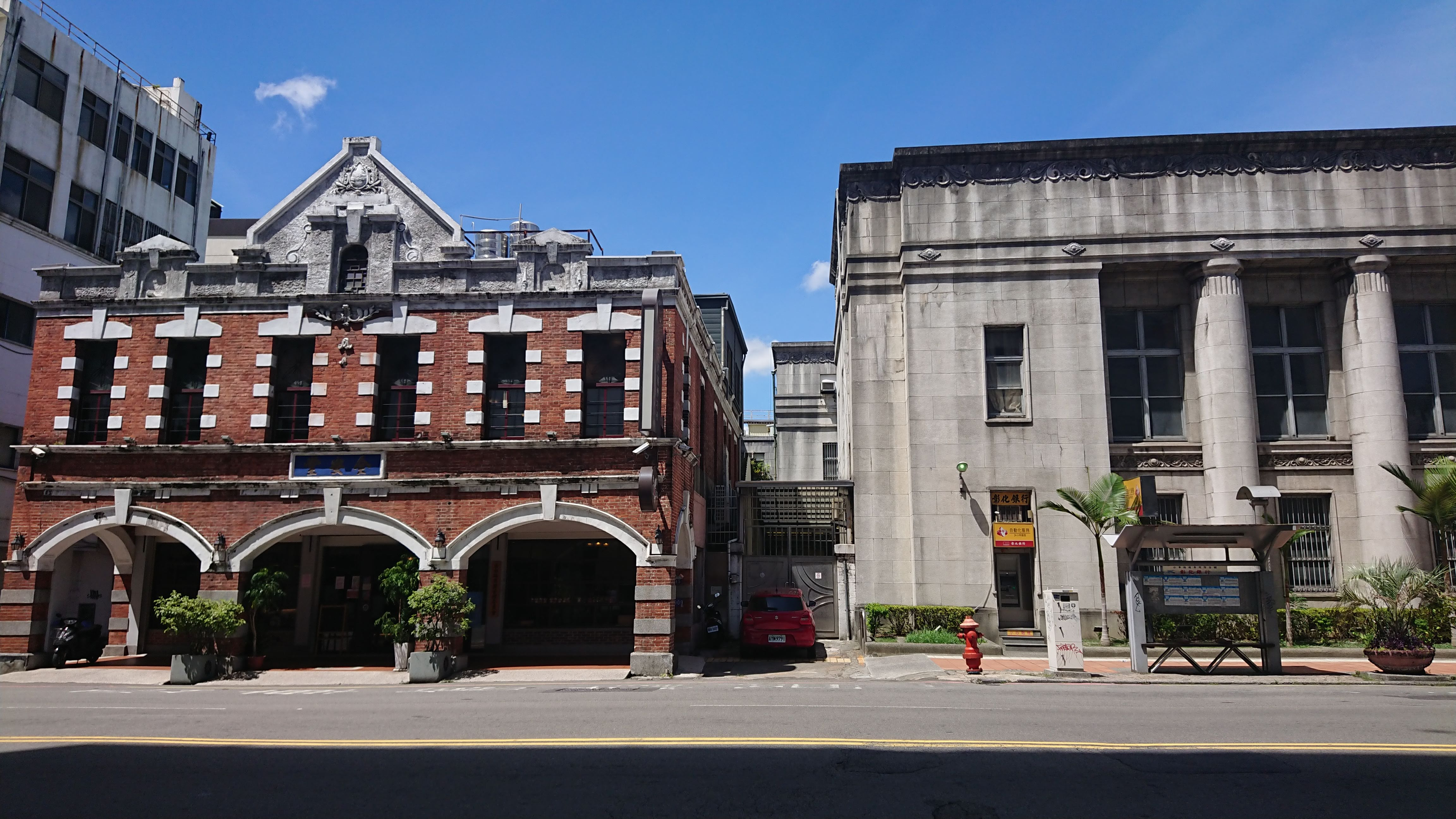
Sun cake museum

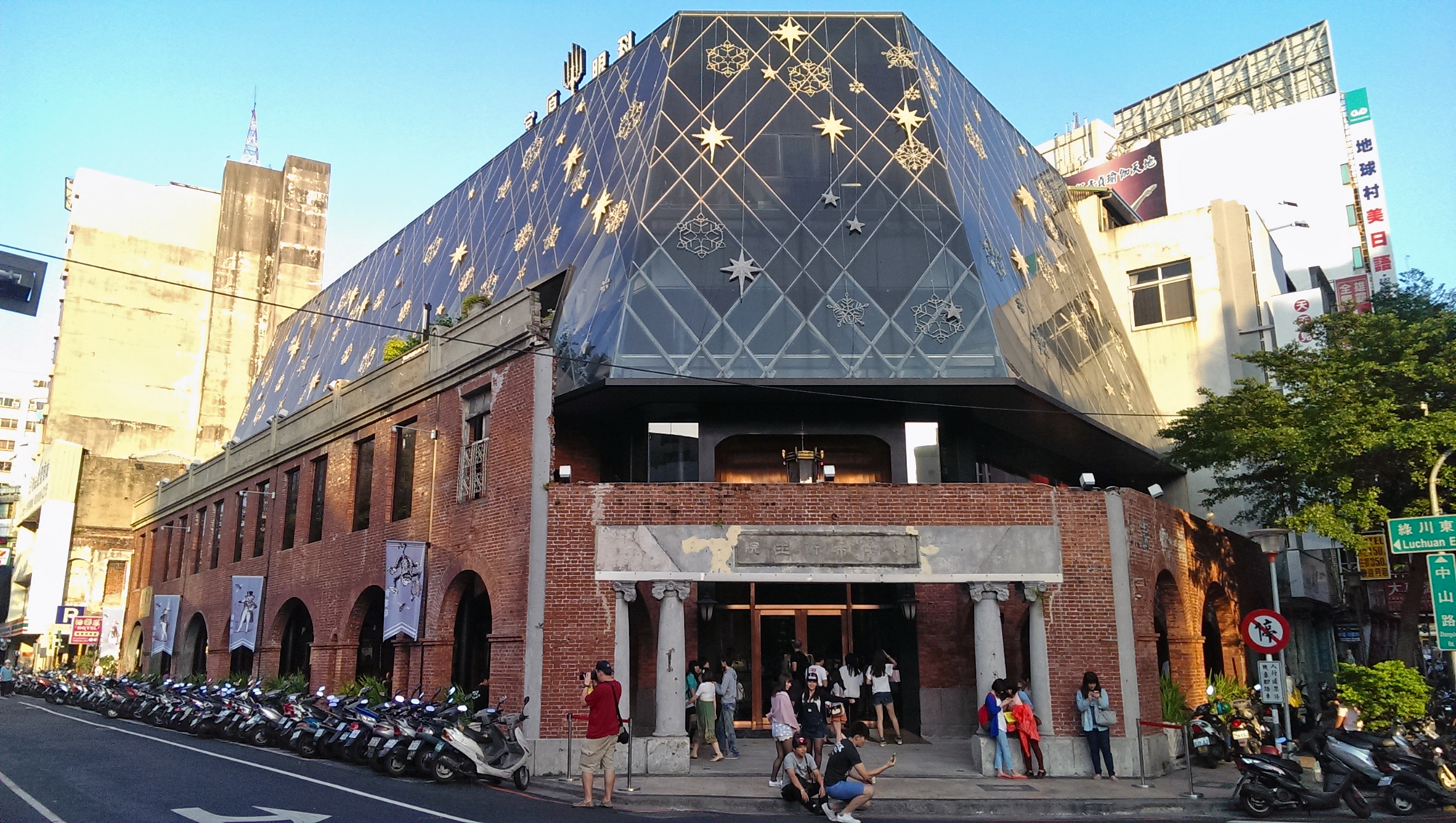
Taichung Miyahara Oculist (Now a department store)

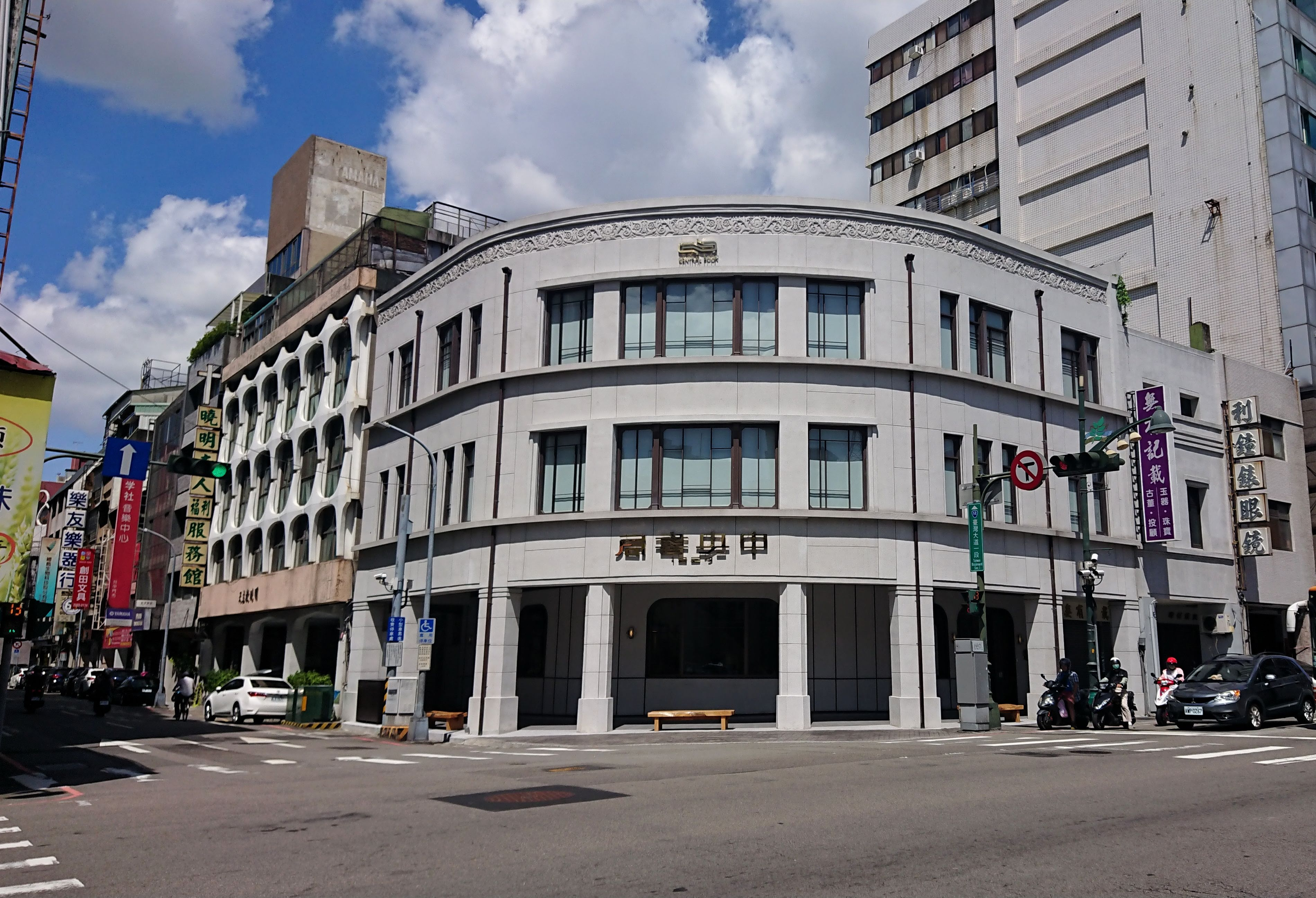
Taichung Chuo Bookstore

== See also ==
- List of ports and harbors of the Pacific Ocean

== Bibliography ==
- Davidson, James W. (1903). "Chapter XVII: Progressive Formosa: A Province of China. 1886-1894". The Island of Formosa, Past and Present : history, people, resources, and commercial prospects : tea, camphor, sugar, gold, coal, sulphur, economical plants, and other productions. London and New York: Macmillan. OL 6931635M.
- Gardella, Robert (1999). "From Treaty Ports to Provincial Status, 1860-1894". In Rubinstein, Murry A. (ed.). Taiwan: A New History. New York: M.E. Sharpe. ISBN 9781563248160.
- Phillips, Steven (1999). "Between Assimilation and Independence: Taiwanese Political Aspirations Under Chinese Nationalist Rule, 1945-1948". In Rubinstein, Murry A. (ed.). Taiwan: A New History. New York: M.E. Sharpe. ISBN 9781563248160.
- Roy, Denny (2003). Taiwan: A Political History. Ithaca: Cornell University Press. ISBN 9780801488054.
- Takekoshi, Yosaburō (1907). Japanese rule in Formosa. London, New York, Bombay and Calcutta: Longmans, Green, and co. OCLC 753129. OL 6986981M.
- 行政院主計總處 (2018-05-30). 105 年工業及服務業普查縣市別初步統計結果 (PDF). www.dgbas.gov.tw.
- 臺中市工商發展投資策進會 (2024). 投資環境介紹. www.idipc.org.tw.
- 陳建元 (2016-02-01). "Taichung Strategic Plan Of Industrial Development" 臺中市產業發展策略計畫 (PDF). rdnet.taichung.gov.tw.
- "臺中縣現住人口 (1946-1958)" (pdf). 臺中縣統計要覽 (Report). Vol. 中華民國47年度[48. 6]. 臺中縣: 臺中縣政府主計室. Jun 1959. pp. 16–24.
- "臺中市現住人口分佈 (1946-1966)". 臺中市統計要覽 (Report). Vol. 中華民國55年度(56. 6). 臺中市政府. June 1967. p. 5.
- "臺中縣現住人口 (1958-1968)" (pdf). 臺中縣統計要覽 (Report). Vol. 中華民國57年度(58. 6). 臺中縣: 臺中縣政府主計室. Jun 1969. pp. 16–25.
- "臺中縣現住人口 (1969-1978)" (pdf). 臺中縣統計要覽 (Report). Vol. 中華民國67年度(68. 9). 臺中縣: 臺中縣政府主計室. Sep 1979. pp. 24- 43+勘誤表[1].
- "臺中市現住人口分佈 (1950-1980)". 臺中市統計要覽 (Report). Vol. 中華民國69年度(70. 7). 臺中市政府. July 1981. pp. 36–37.
- "臺中縣現住人口 (1971-1980)" (pdf). 臺中縣統計要覽 (Report). Vol. 中華民國69年(70. 9). 臺中縣: 臺中縣政府主計室. Sep 1981. pp. 22-41+勘誤表[1].
