= East District, Taichung =

District in Taichung, Taiwan

Coordinates: 24.137276°N 120.696732°E

East 東區
- District
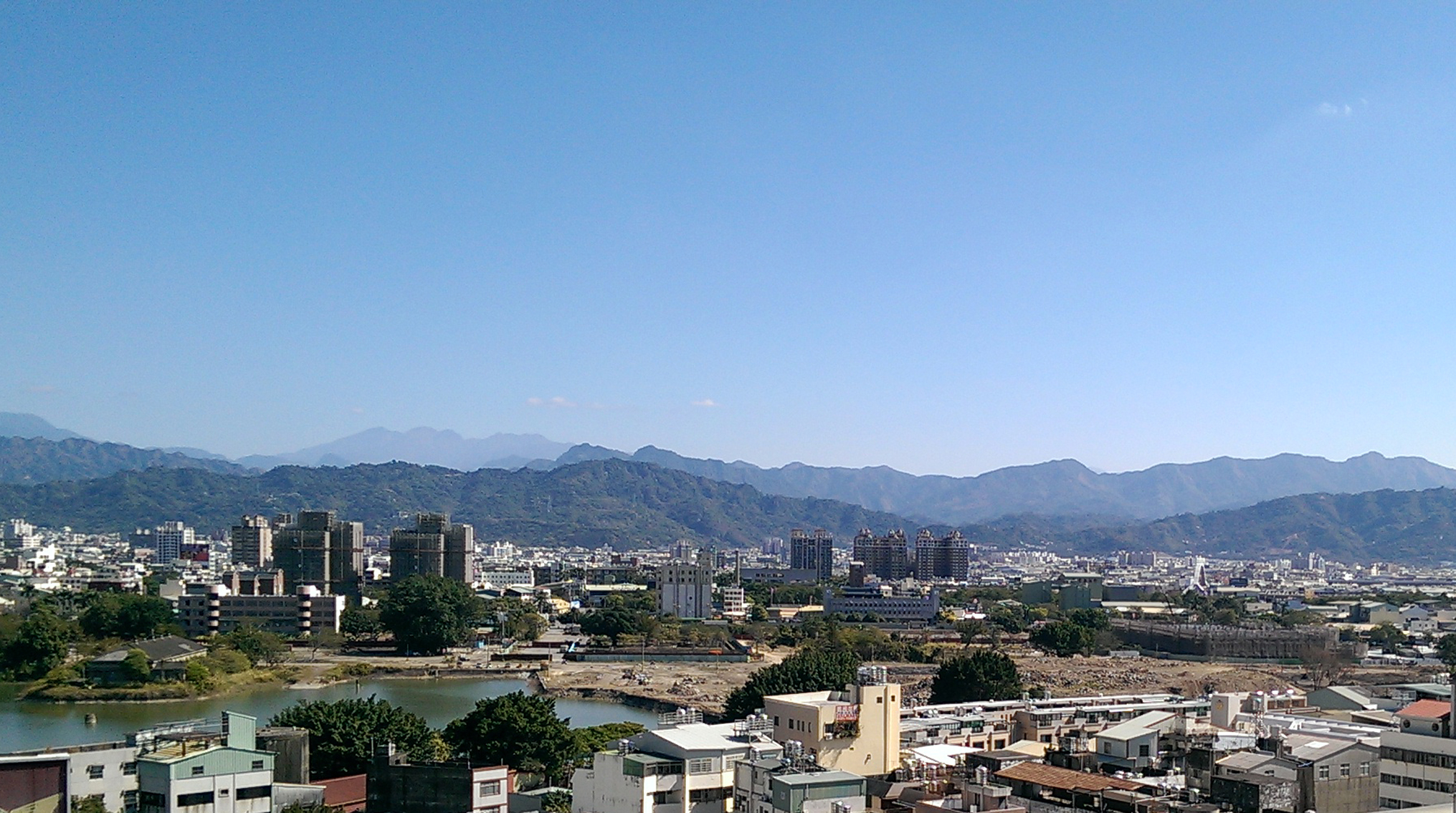

- East District in Taichung City
- Location: Taichung, Taiwan

Area
  - Total: 9.26 km^{2} (3.58 sq mi)

Population (February 2023)
  - Total: 75,801
  - Density: 8,190/km^{2} (21,200/sq mi)
- Website: www.east.taichung.gov.tw (in Chinese)

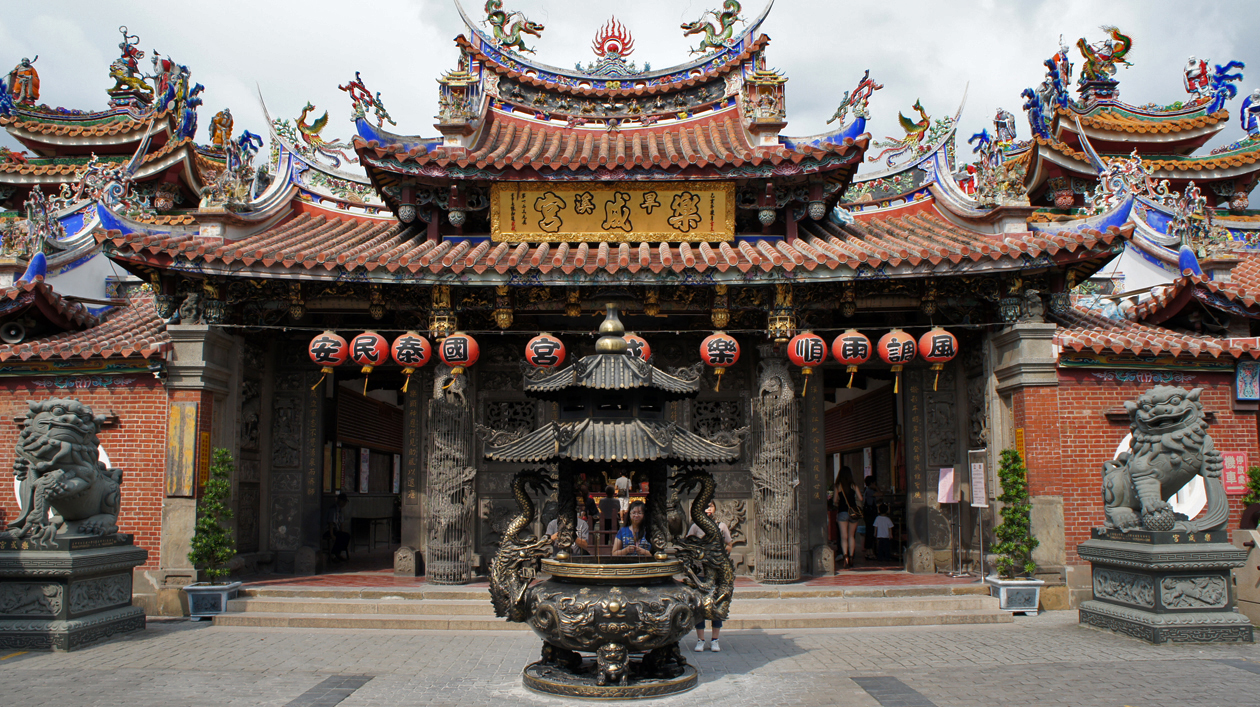
Lecheng Temple to the sea-goddess Mazu

East District (Chinese: 東區; pinyin: Dōng Qū) is an urban district in Taichung, Taiwan. It was a part of Taichung City before the City and County were merged in 2010.

== History ==
The district used to be part of the Taichung provincial city before the merger with Taichung County to form the Taichung special municipality on 25 December 2010.

== Administrative divisions ==
East District is divided into 17 villages, which are: Xinzhuang, Zhenxing, Tungqiao, Tungxing, Quanyuan, Gancheng, Hanxi, Lecheng, Tungmen, Shijia, Tungying, Tungnan, Tungshi, Gezuo, Furen, Futai and Tungxin.

== Tourist attractions ==
- Hanxi Night Market
- Dongguang Green Tunnel (東光錄園道)
- Lecheng Temple
- Lin Family Ancestral Shrine
- Zhang Liao Family Temple
- Mitsui Shopping Park LaLaport Taichung

== Transportation ==
The district is served the Jingwu and Taichung stations of Taiwan Railway.

== See also ==
- Taichung
