= Lin Family Ancestral Shrine =

Ancestral shrine in East District, Taichung, Taiwan

- 林氏宗祠
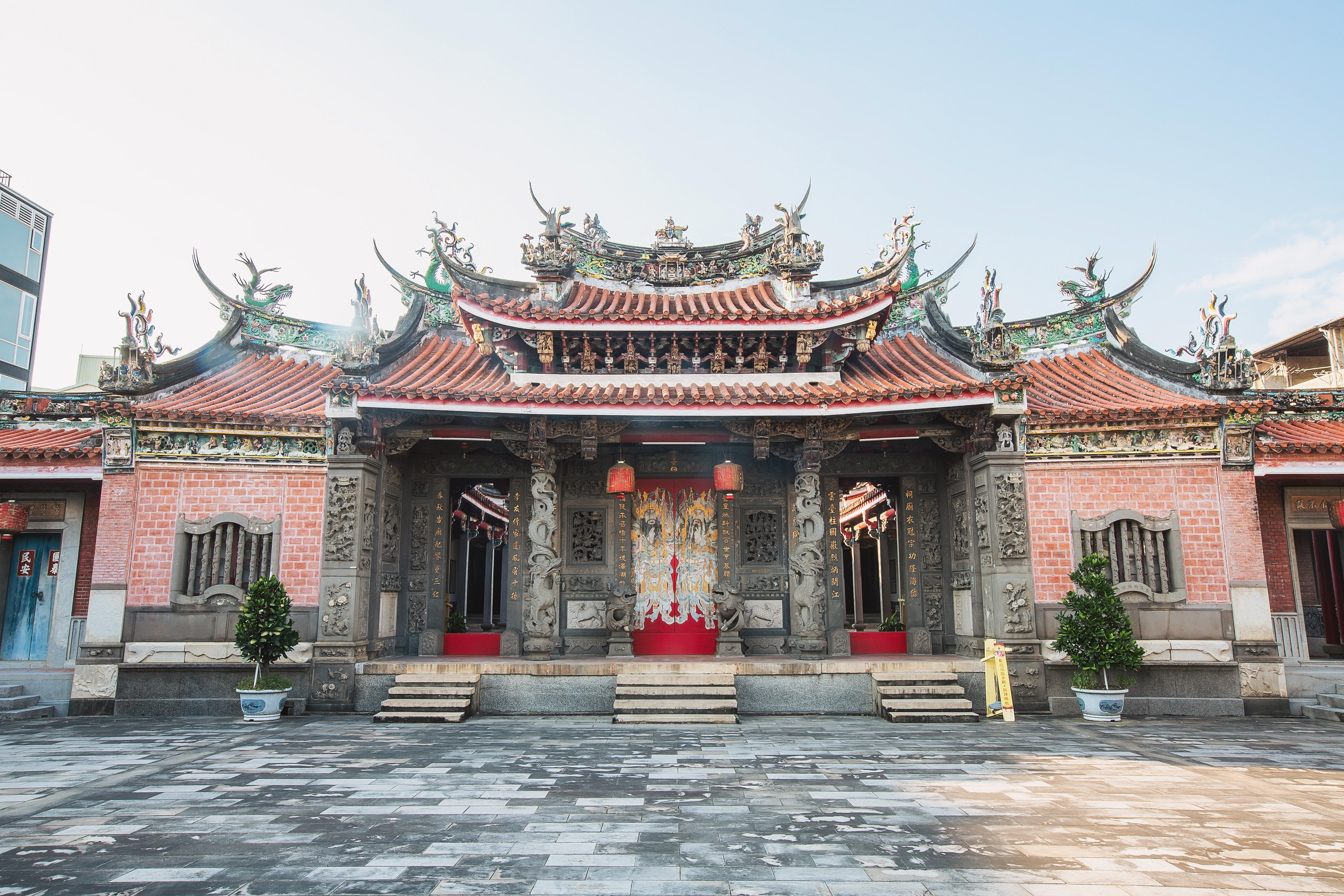

Location
- Location: East District, Taichung
- Country: Taiwan
- Interactive map of Lin Family Ancestral Shrine
- Coordinates: 24.1315°N 120.6774°E

Architecture
- Completed: 1930
- Direction of façade: Southeast

Lin Family Ancestral Shrine (Chinese: 林氏宗祠; pinyin: Línshì Zōngcí) is an ancestral shrine located in East District, Taichung City, Taiwan. Built in 1930, the shrine is protected as a city monument.

== History ==
The Lin family is a large and influential clan in the history of central Taiwan and has several subdivisions spread throughout the area, most notably Wufeng Lin family. The original ancestral shrine was located in current-day Dali District. The founding date of this shrine is unknown: a 1952 stone engraving inside the shrine claims that it was during the reign of Jiaqing Emperor, while a 1934 Japanese-era newspaper claims that its 1775. Beginning in 1895, the shrine was moved multiple times; the current shrine's construction lasted between 1918 and 1930.

On November 27, 1985, the Taichung City Government protected the shrine as a city monument.

== Architecture ==
The Lin Family Ancestral Shrine was designed by Chen Yingshan (陳應杉) and built with the traditional Hokkien architectural style. The halls are arranged in siheyuan layout with halls that divide the center space into seven courtyards of various sizes. Its walls are made of brick that is structurally reinforced by wooden supports on the inside. Sculptures and paintings decorate the shrine to signify the wealth of the Lin family. Since it was built in the Japanese era, Japanese and European materials and techniques are also visible in the shrine.

== Gallery ==
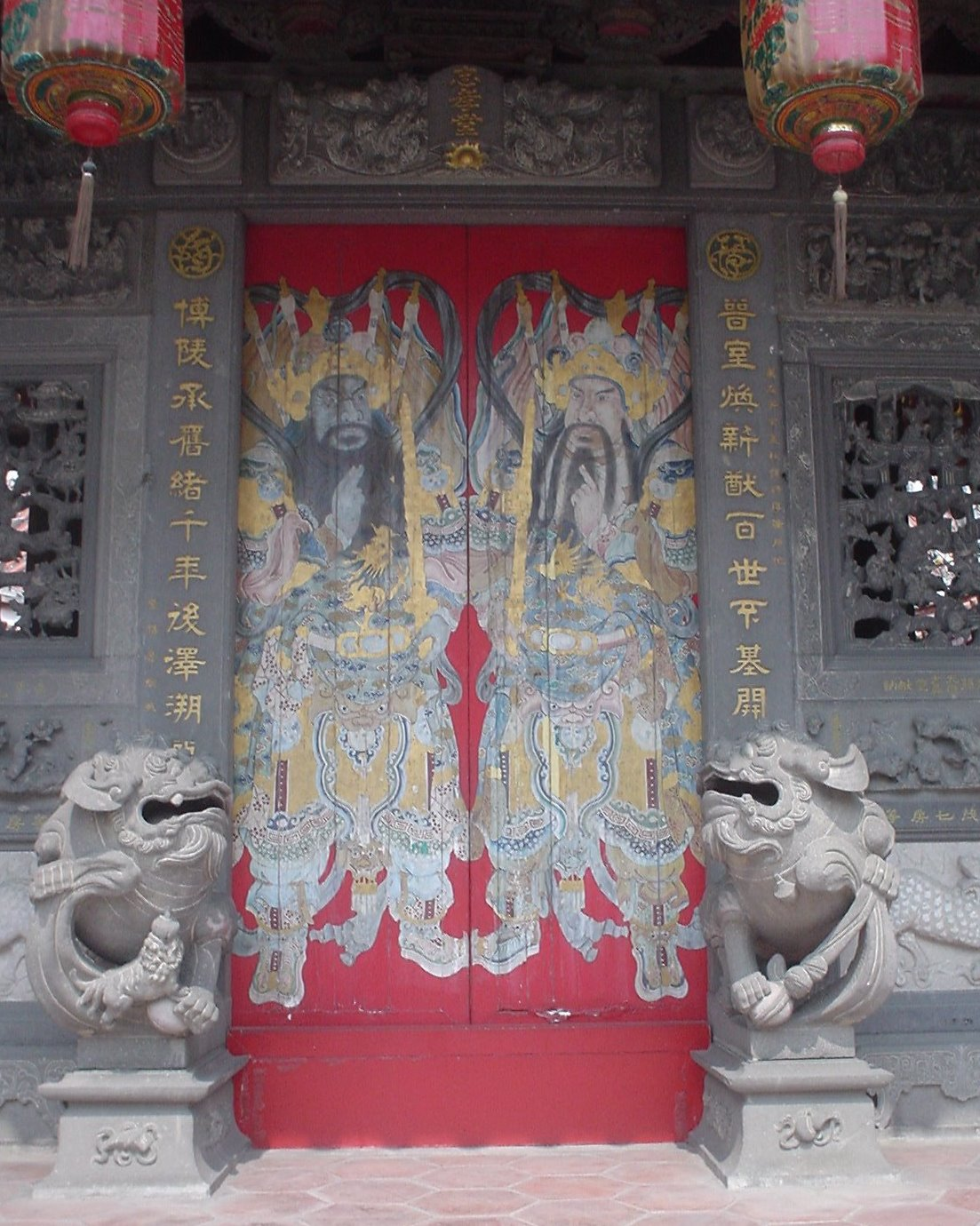
A painted door inside the shrine

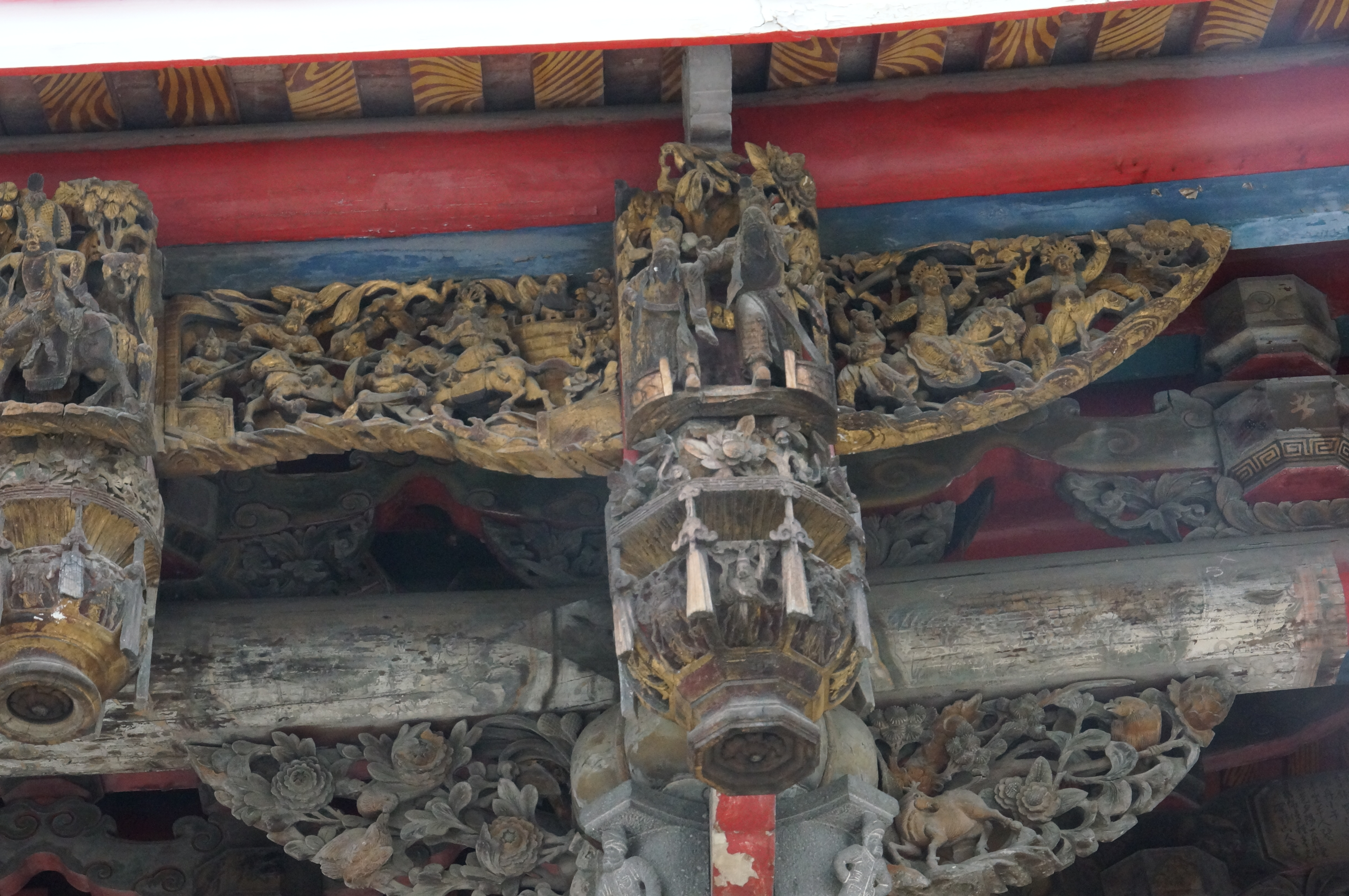
Intricate wood carvings on the wooden beams and columns

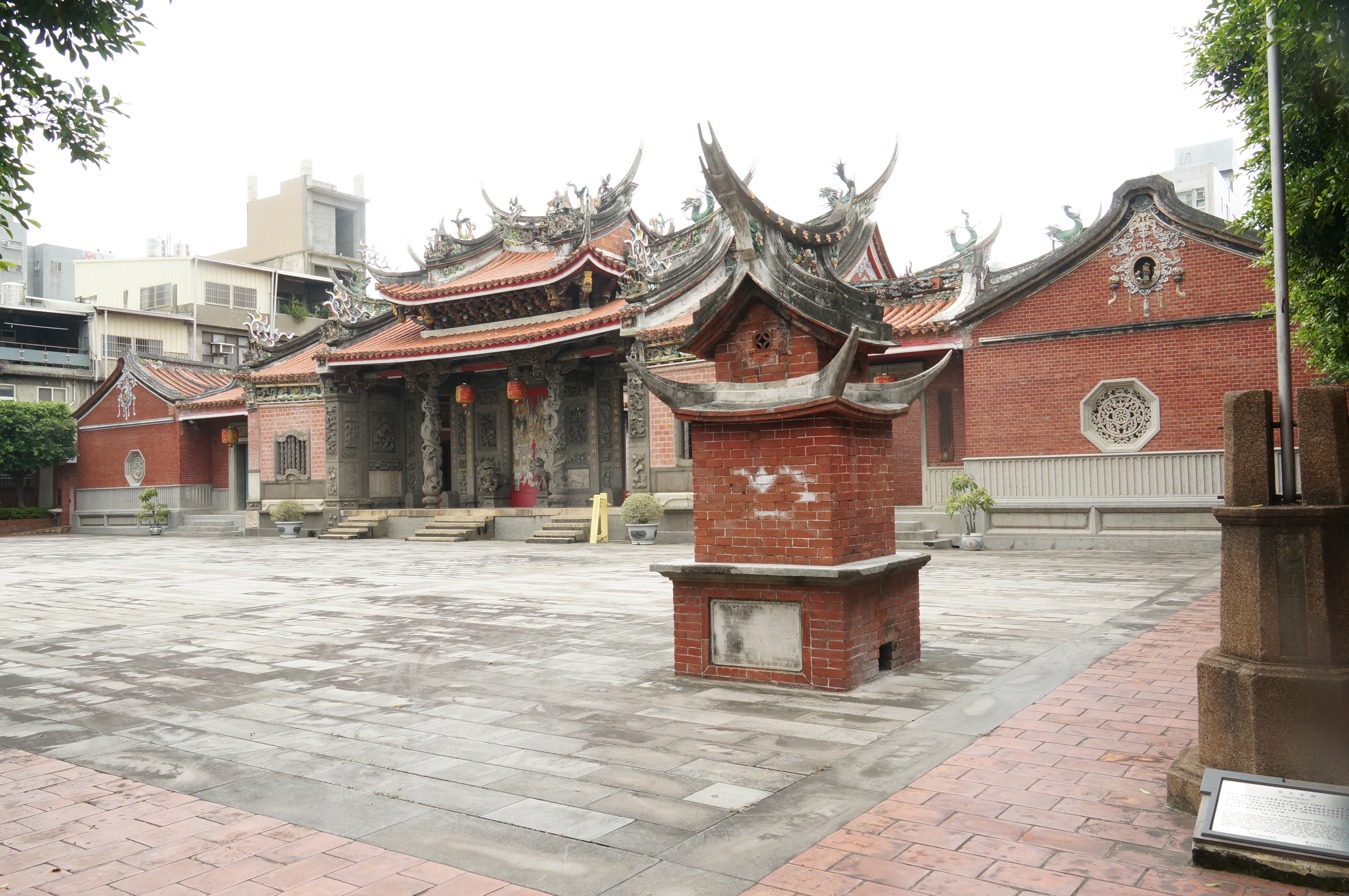
Exterior courtyard with a small tower for burning joss paper

== See also ==
- Chinese ancestral veneration
- List of temples in Taichung
- List of temples in Taiwan
- Zhang Family Temple
- Zhang Liao Family Temple
