= Zhang Family Temple =

Ancestral shrine in Xitun, Taichung, Taiwan

- 張家祖廟
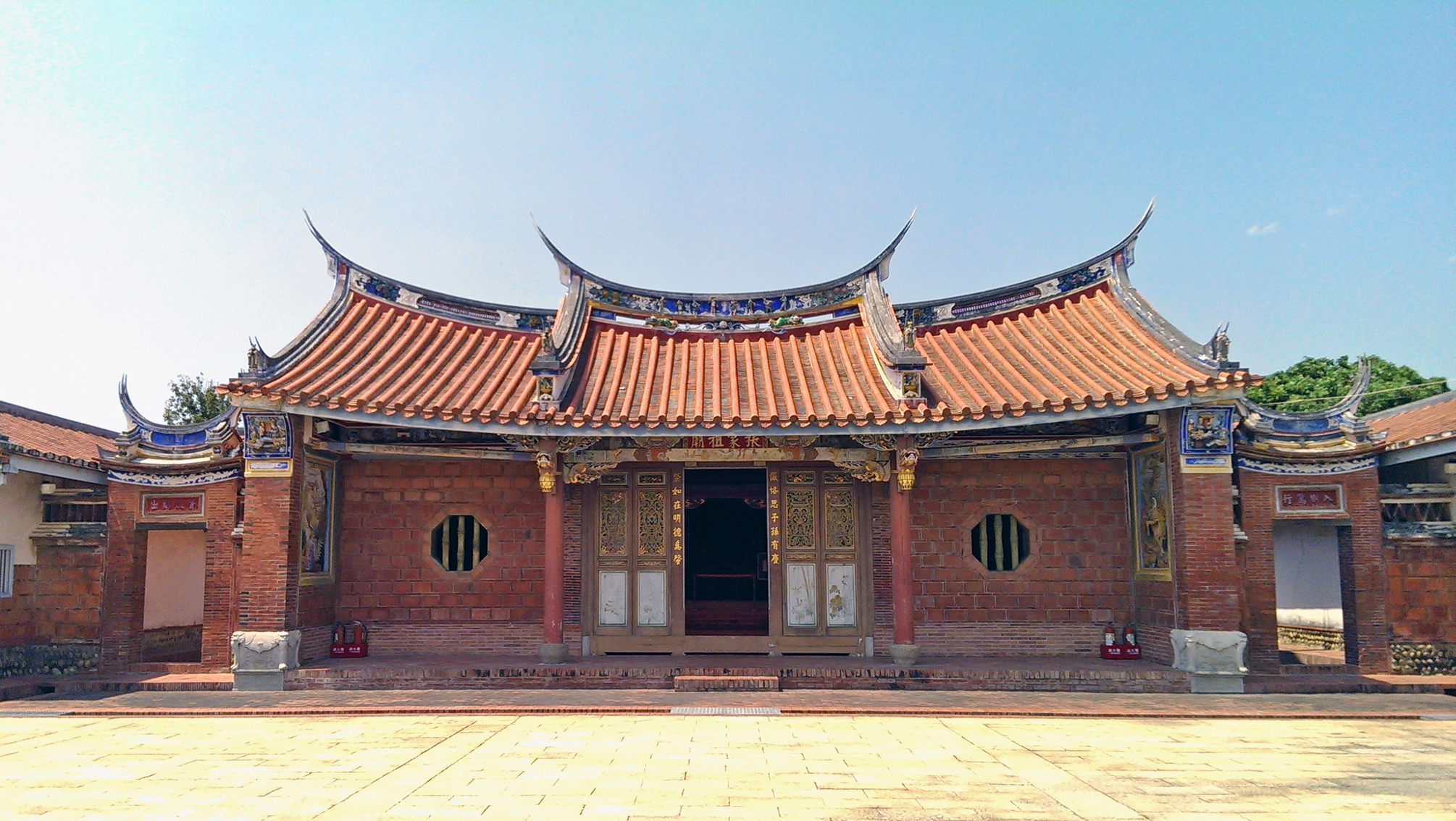
- Main hall of the shrine

Location
- Location: Xitun District, Taichung
- Country: Taiwan
- Interactive map of Zhang Family Temple
- Coordinates: 24.1761°N 120.6219°E

Architecture
- Completed: 1904
- Direction of façade: East

Zhang Family Temple (Chinese: 張家祖廟; pinyin: Zhāngjiā Zǔmiào) is an ancestral shrine located in Xitun District, Taichung City, Taiwan. Built in 1904, the shrine is protected as a city monument.

== History ==
The Matang Zhang clan (馬堂張家) originated in Ninghua County, Fujian Province and migrated to central Taiwan. In 1870, several Zhang family members established a simple ancestral shrine in a house in Shangniupuzi (上牛埔子). When the land was taken by the Japanese government to build Shuinan Airport, in 1904, family built another shine in its current location of Xiaqizhangli (下七張犁).

After World War II, the Zhang family carried out a series of renovations to the building, including replacing the roof tiles and using concrete to reinforce the structure. On November 27, 1985, the Taichung City Government protected the building as a city monument, but did not protect the left wing because it was heavily altered during the renovations; it would later be protected as a historical building on August 6, 2009.

== Architecture ==
The shrine complex is a siheyuan that contains ten buildings that are made of different materials: six of rammed earth blocks, two of wood, and two of straw. The main hall is named "Faxiangtang" (發祥堂) and is used for worship. The left wing was used as the private residence for the Zhang family while the right was leased out to farmers; therefore, the two wings are noticeably not symmetrical. There are three wooden plaques (bian'e) that date to the Qing Dynasty.

== Gallery ==
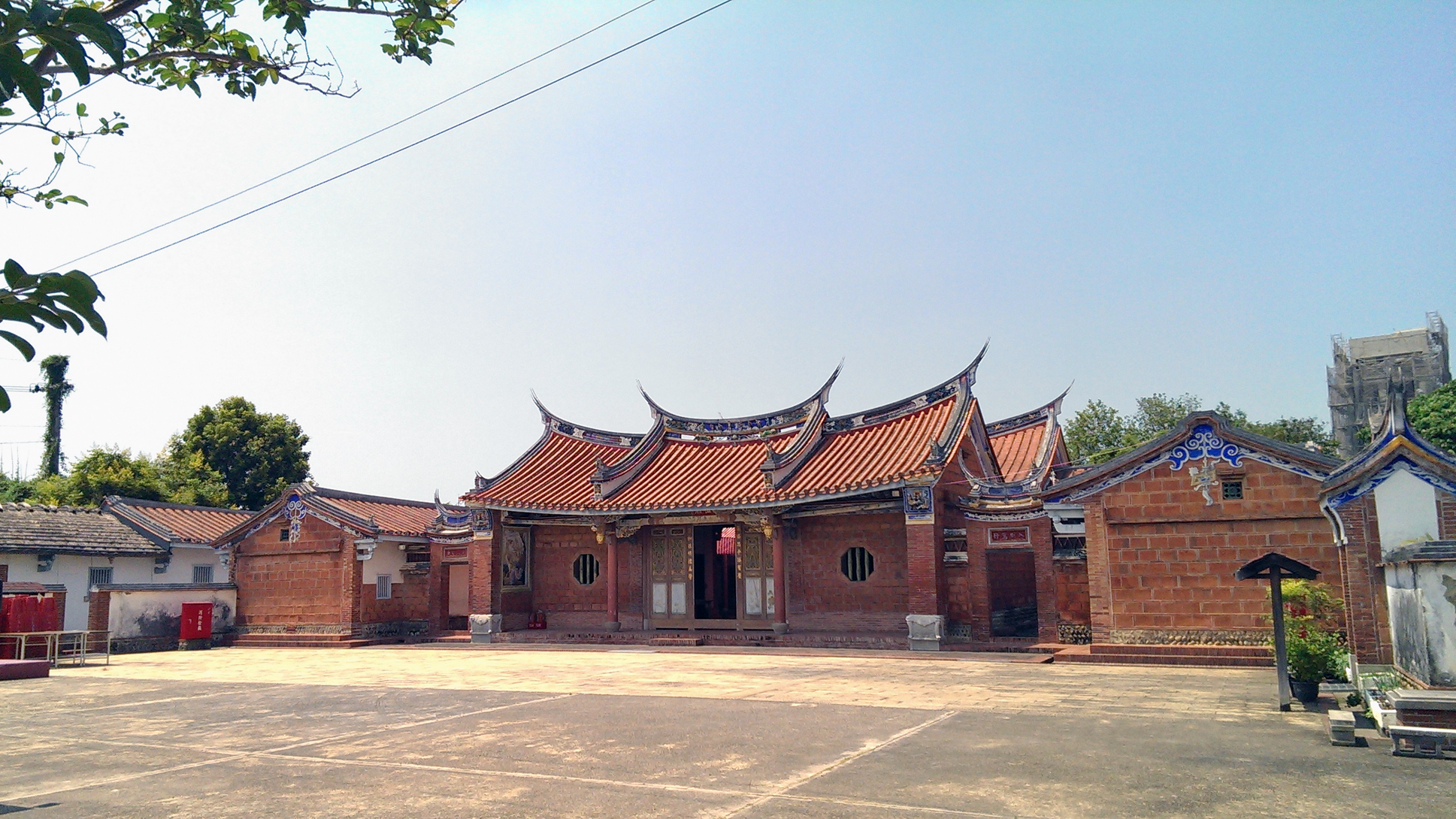
Shrine courtyard

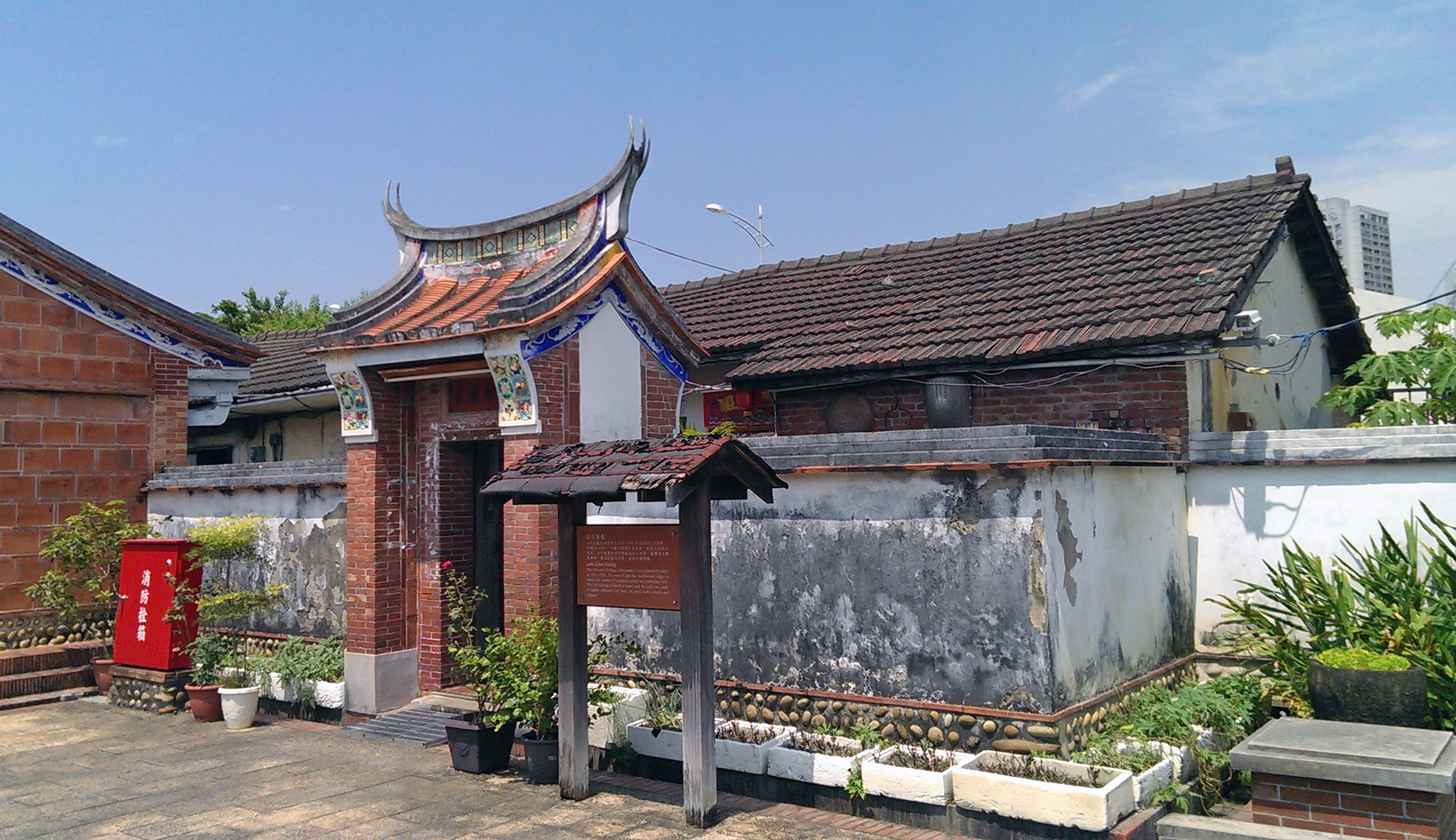
Left wing of the shrine, which was protected at a different time

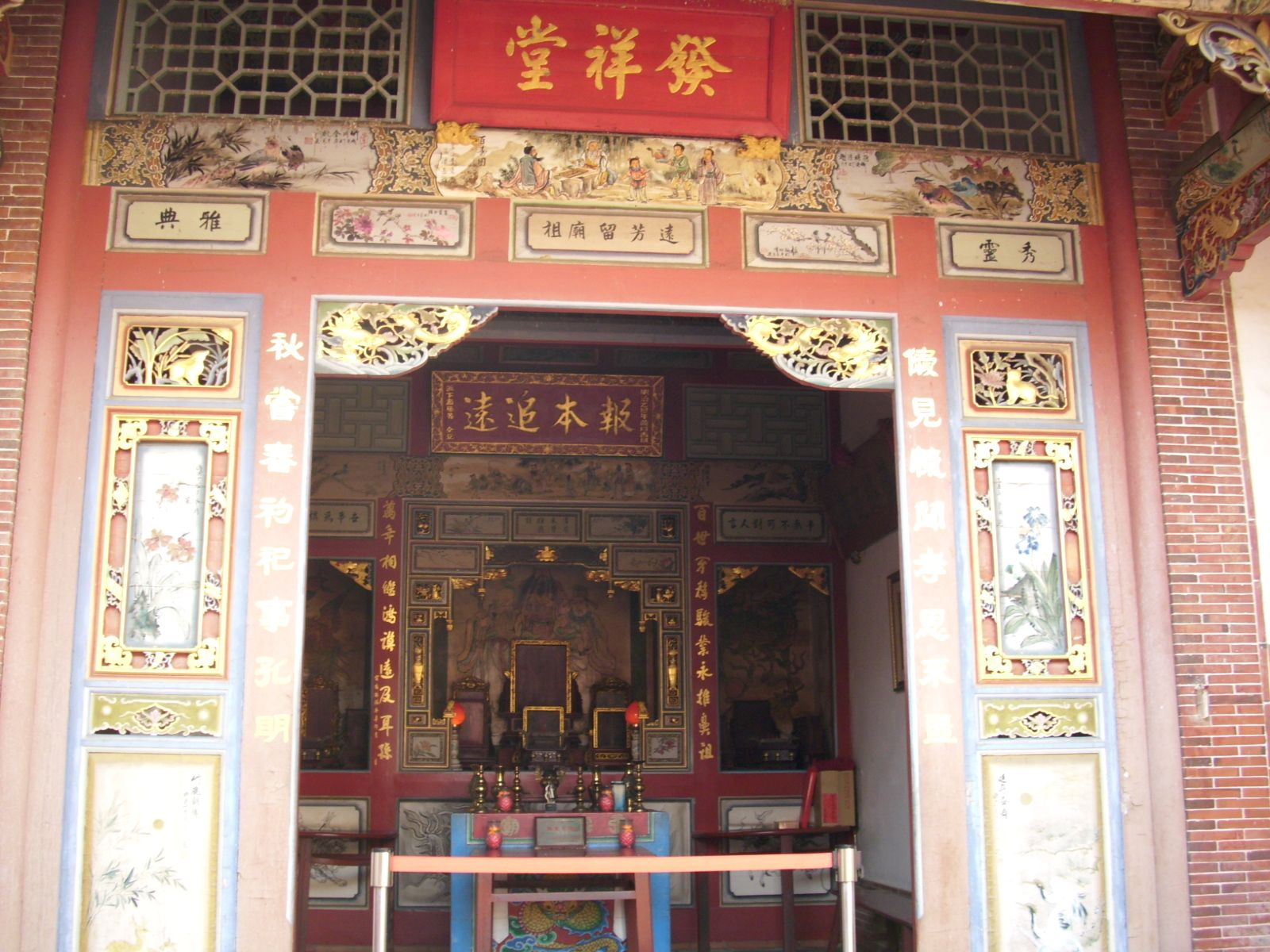
The interior of the main hall

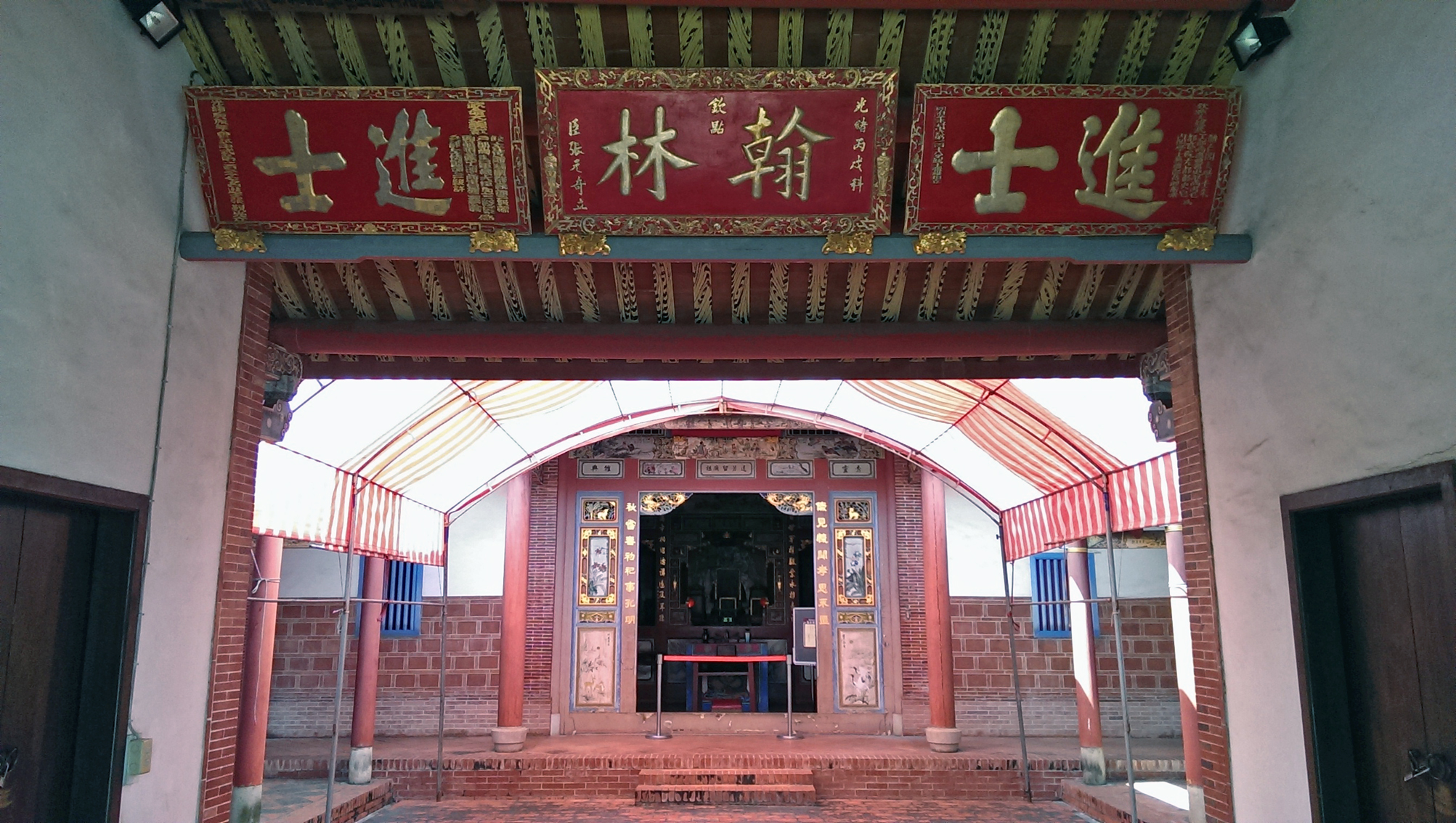
The three Qing Dynasty wooden plaques above a doorway

== See also ==
- Chinese ancestral veneration
- List of temples in Taichung
- List of temples in Taiwan
- Zhang Liao Family Temple
- Lin Family Ancestral Shrine
