= Lecheng Temple =

Temple in East District, Taichung, Taiwan

- 樂成宮
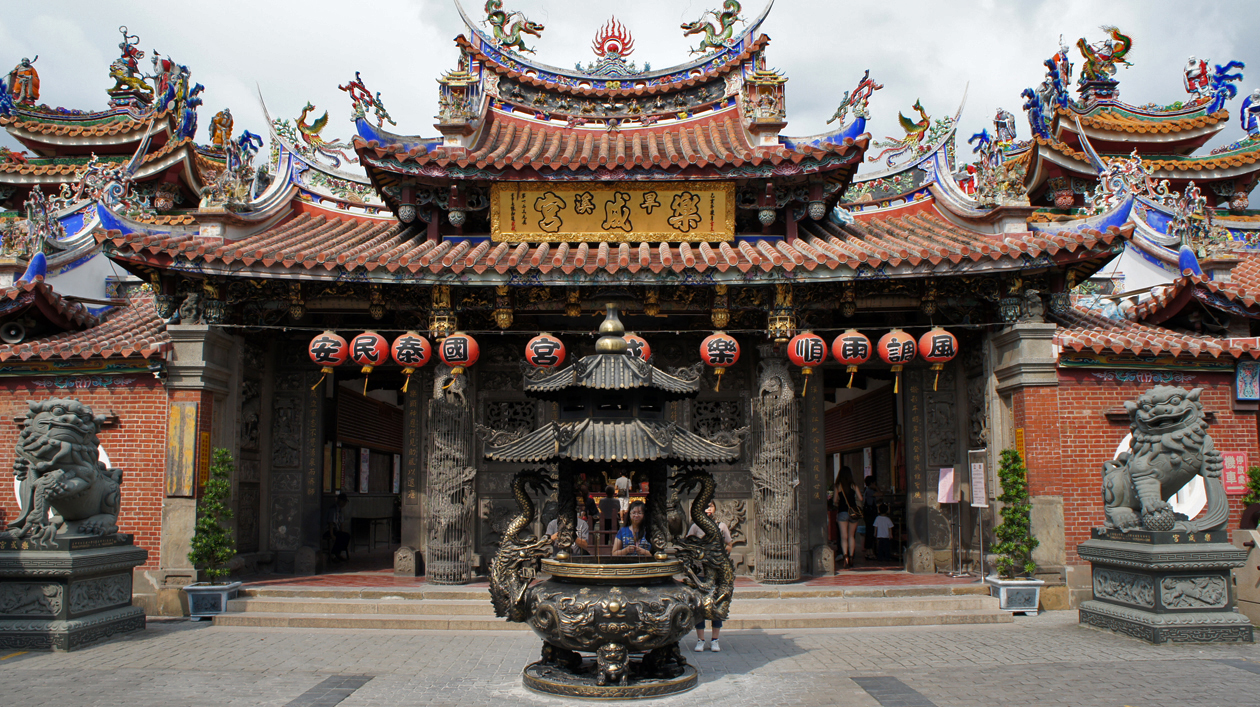
- Temple facade

Religion
- Deity: Mazu

Location
- Location: East District, Taichung
- Country: Taiwan
- Interactive map of Lecheng Temple
- Coordinates: 24.1407°N 120.69815°E

Architecture
- Completed: 1790
- Direction of façade: Southwest

Lecheng Temple (Chinese: 樂成宮; pinyin: Lèchéng Gōng) is a temple located in East District, Taichung City, Taiwan. Mazu is the main deity worshipped in the temple, and the sea goddess is known as the "Hanxi Mazu" (Chinese: 旱溪媽祖; pinyin: Hànxī Māzǔ) after the nearby Han River.

== History ==
During the reign of Qianlong Emperor in the 18th century, the Lin family migrated from mainland China to Taiwan. They brought a statue of Mazu from Tianhou Temple in Meizhou, which is the original Mazu temple, and brought it along for safety. When they settled along the banks of the Han River, the statue was housed in a hut near its current site. According to legend, the traveling settlers placed the statue on a rock while they were resting. When they tried to pick it up again, the statue suddenly became very heavy, which was interpreted that the deity wanted them to settle there. A small temple was erected at the site, which was replaced by a formal temple in 1790.

None of the original temple structure remains; the current temple was built between 1921 and 1928. On November 27, 1985, the Taichung City Government protected Lecheng Temple as a city monument. The last hall constructed was the rear hall in 1991.

== Architecture ==
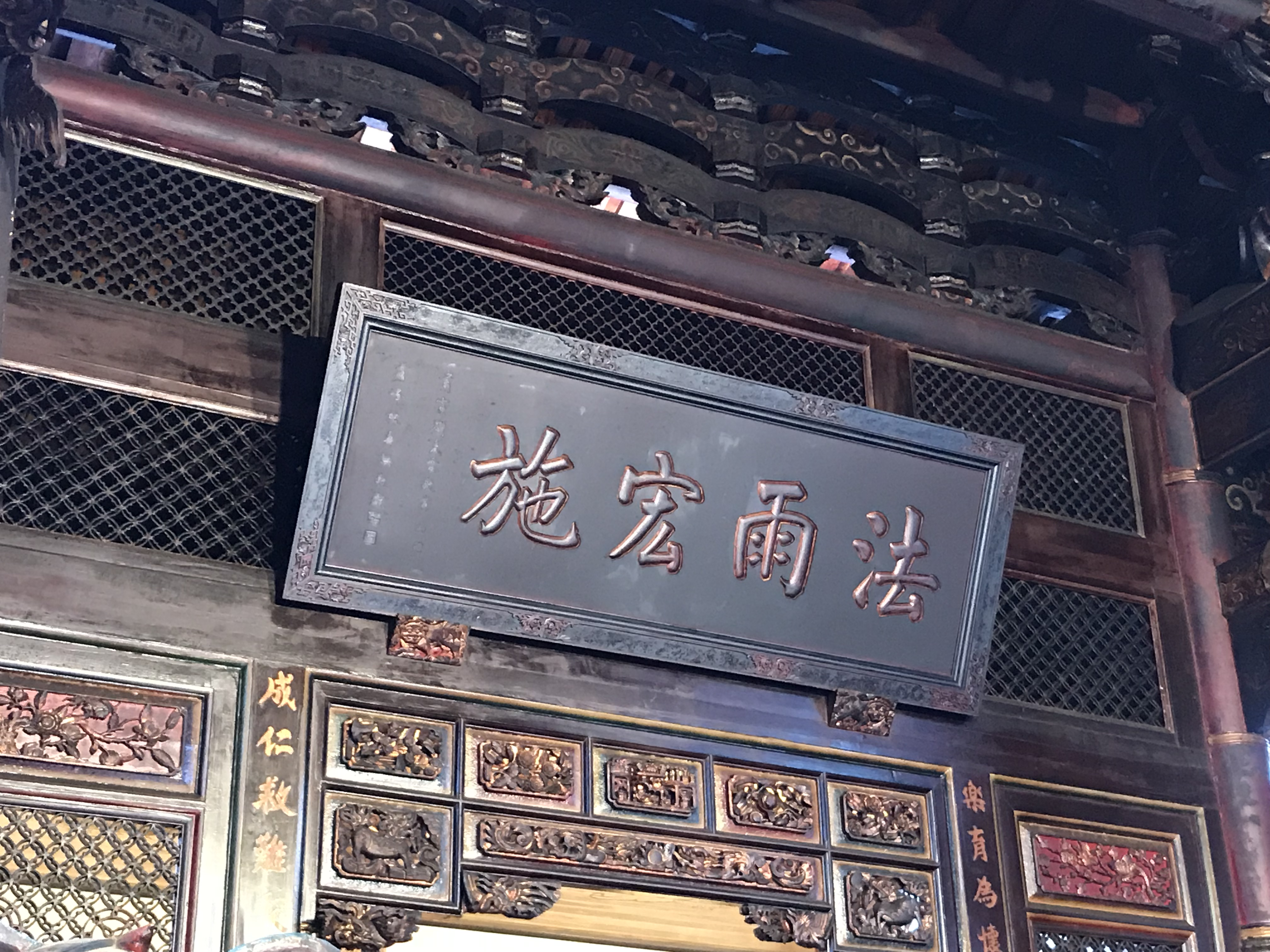
The Fǎyǔ Hóngshē plaque

Lecheng Temple has three central halls and two long halls running down the sides. In the main hall, Mazu sits in the center accompanied by Guanyin and Zhusheng Niangniang on the sides; the surrounding halls contain other deities as well. The temple is also decorated with elaborate wooden sculptures by Cheng Ying-shan, one of the most celebrated woodworkers of his era. In the main hall, there is a Qing dynasty wooden plaque (bian'e) inscribed with Fǎyǔ Hóngshē (法雨宏施) that was created by Liu Chun-lin, who is remembered as the last zhuangyuan in Chinese history.

== Eighteen village pilgrimage ==
Every third month of the Chinese calendar, Hanxi Mazu embarks on a twenty two day pilgrimage to the eighteen neighboring villages. The practice dates back to 1823 when farmers were facing a pest infestation. Farmers in Xializi (下哩仔, in modern-day Wuri District) asked Lecheng Temple to bring Mazu to their village and get rid of the pests, which the temple agreed to. Gradually, neighboring settlements began asking the temple to visit their villages as well, which became a yearly tradition.

During the pilgrimage, Hanxi Mazu visits many temples and covers a total of ten districts: Wuri, Dali, Taiping, Wufeng, East, South, West, North, Nantun, and Beitun. On August 12, 2008, the Taichung City Government recognized the tradition as an "intangible cultural heritage".
