= Zhang Liao Family Temple =

Ancestral shrine in Xitun, Taichung, Taiwan

- 張廖家廟
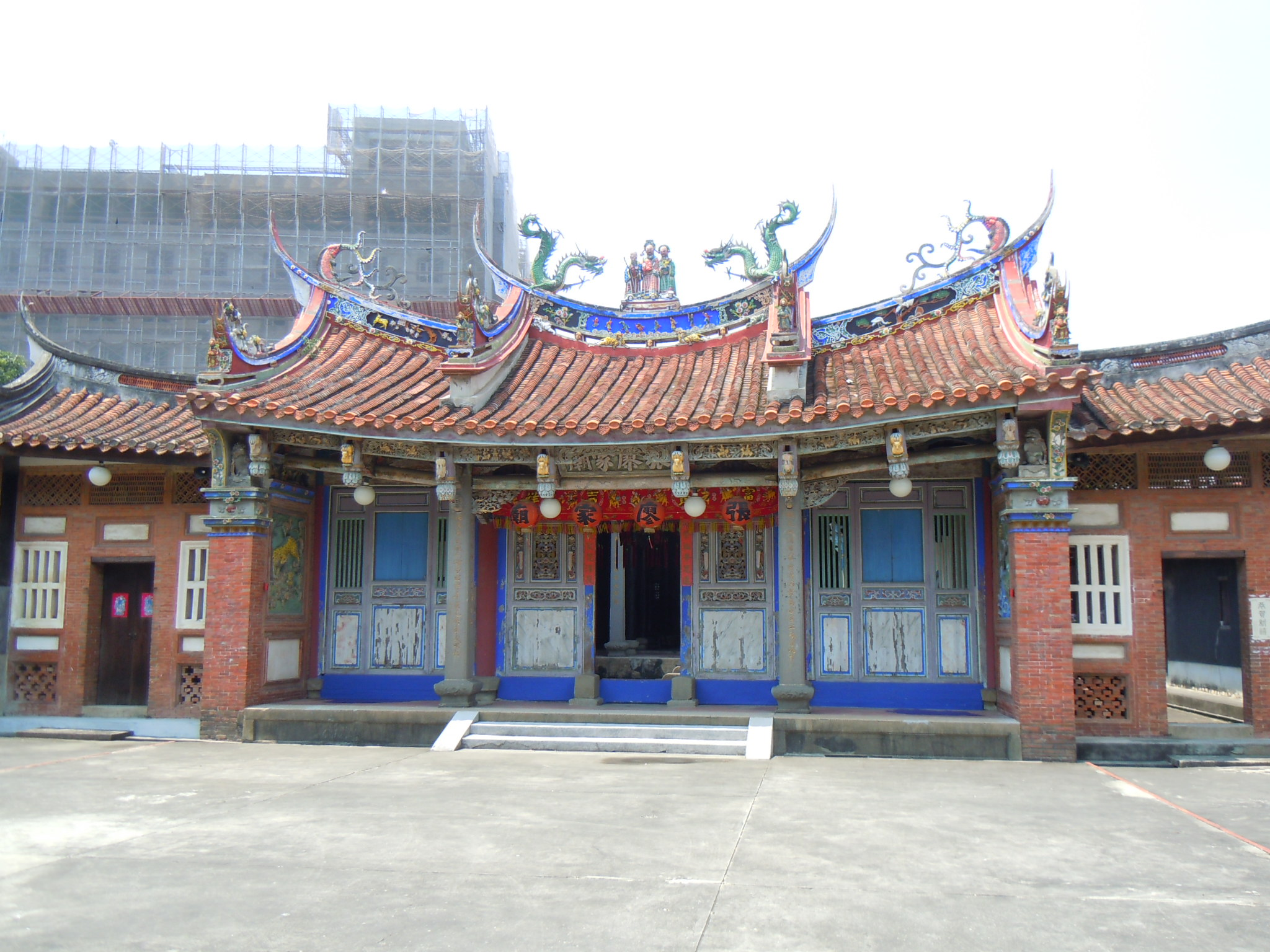
- Shrine facade

Location
- Location: Xitun, Taichung
- Country: Taiwan
- Interactive map of Zhang Liao Family Temple
- Coordinates: 24.1824°N 120.6455°E

Architecture
- Completed: 1911
- Direction of façade: South

Zhang Liao Family Temple (Chinese: 張廖家廟; pinyin: Zhāngliào Jiāmiào) is an ancestral shrine located in Xitun District, Taichung City, Taiwan. Built in 1904, the shrine is protected as a city monument.

== History ==
The Zhang Liao family originated in current-day Guanbei, Fujian Province. The unique surname is a merger of the Zhang and Liao families when the Liao's only female successor married into the Zhang family. At the time, the families came to an agreement; future descendants of this clan would use the Liao surname when alive, but would belong to the Zhang family when dead.

In the early Qing Dynasty, the Zhang Liao family moved to current day Xitun District and Daya District. In 1886, Zhang Liao members began preparing to build a family shrine. Construction of the main building lasted between 1909 and 1911, and the surrounding buildings were completed in 1916.

On November 27, 1985, the Taichung City Government protected the building as a city monument. The building was renovated by the government in 1994 and is planning on renovating it again in 2020.

== Gallery ==
Shrine interior

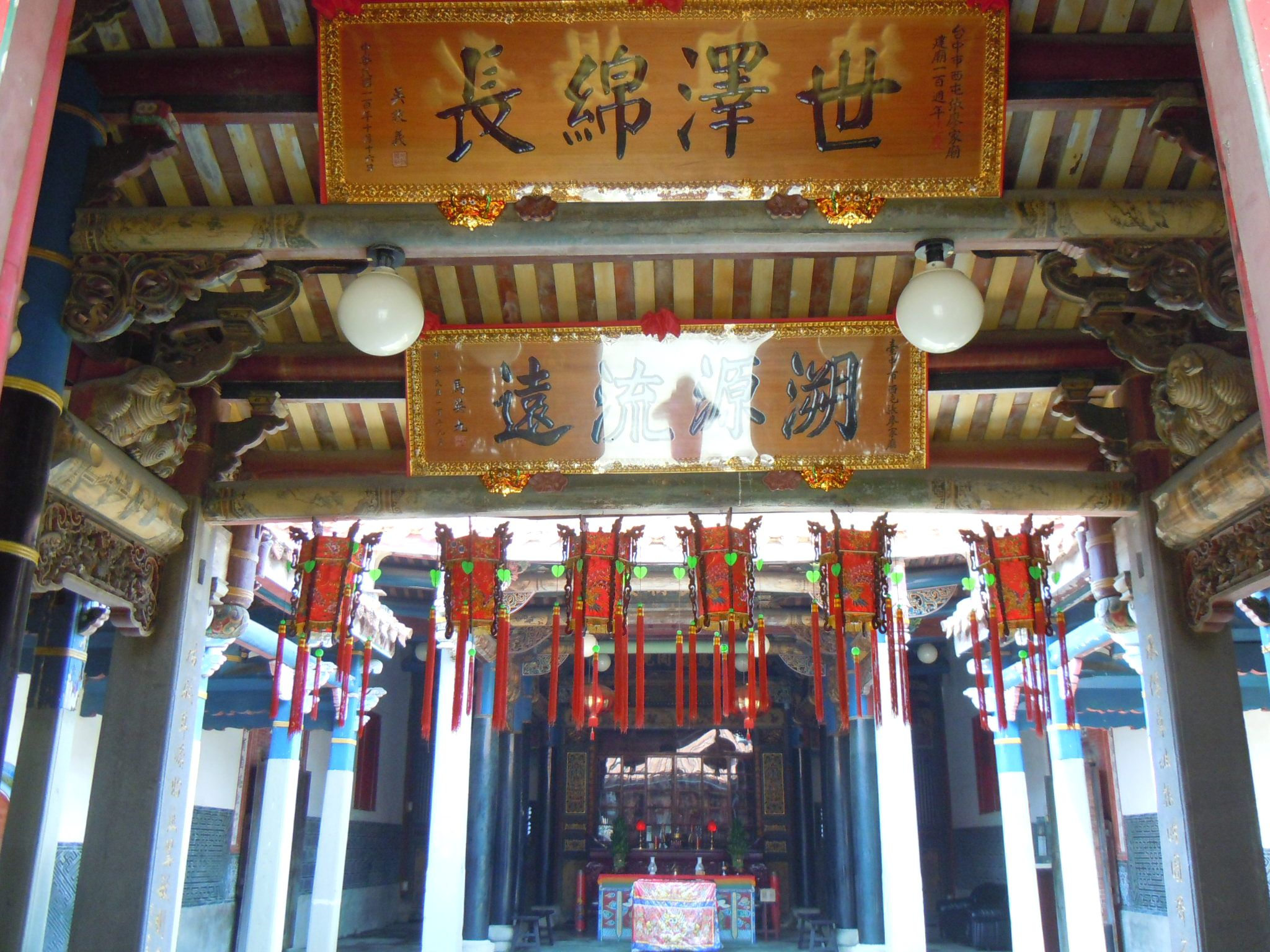
Two wooden plaques (bian'e) inside the shrine

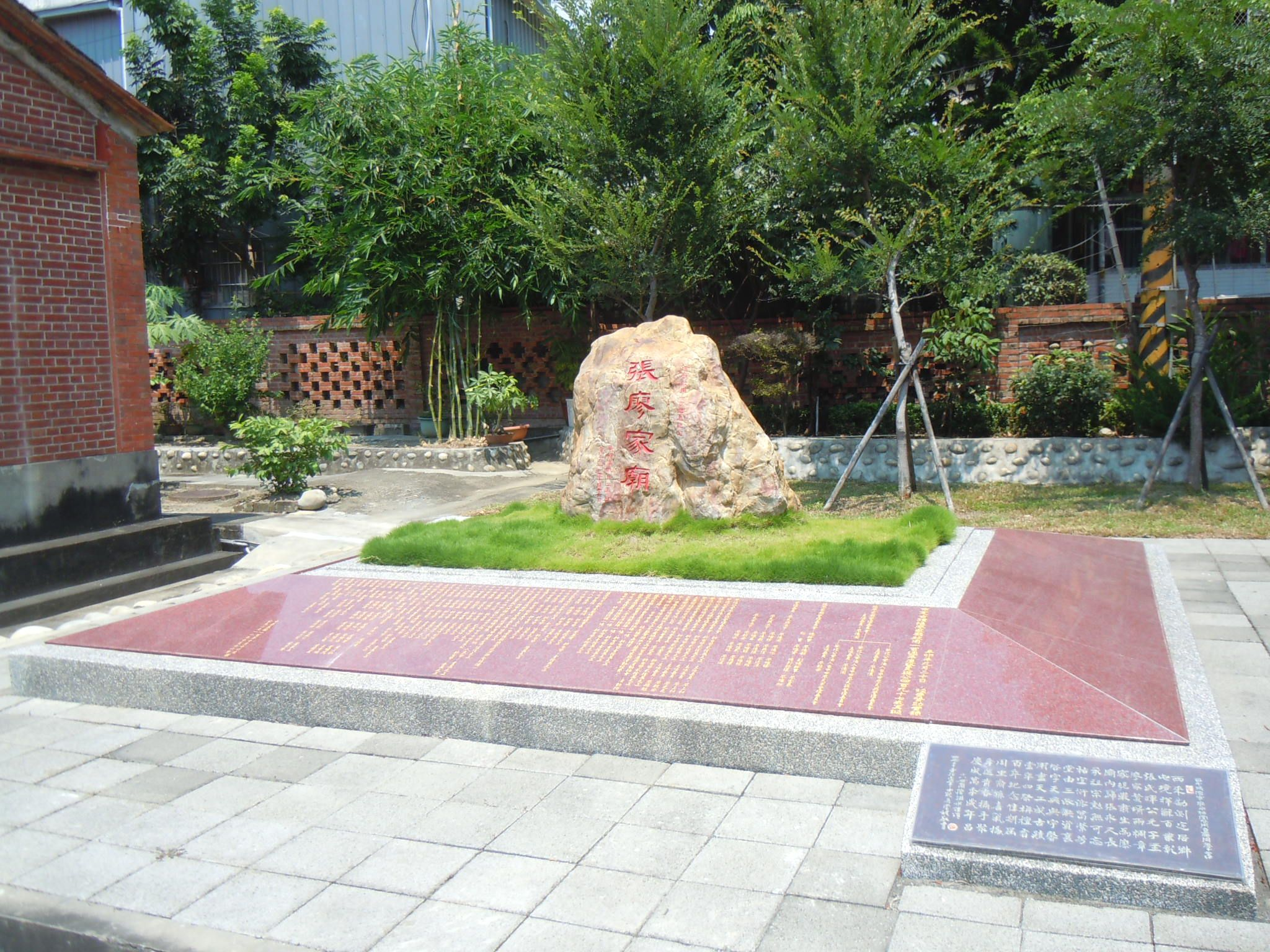
A stone plaque in the courtyard

== See also ==
- Chinese ancestral veneration
- List of temples in Taichung
- List of temples in Taiwan
- Zhang Family Temple
- Lin Family Ancestral Shrine
