= List of temples in Taichung =

Like many of Taiwan's older cities, Taichung (founded in 1705) has a large number of old temples and shrines that have historical value and are typical of the eras in which they were built. They include Taoist, Buddhist, and Confucian temples.

== Confucian temples ==
=== Confucius Temple ===
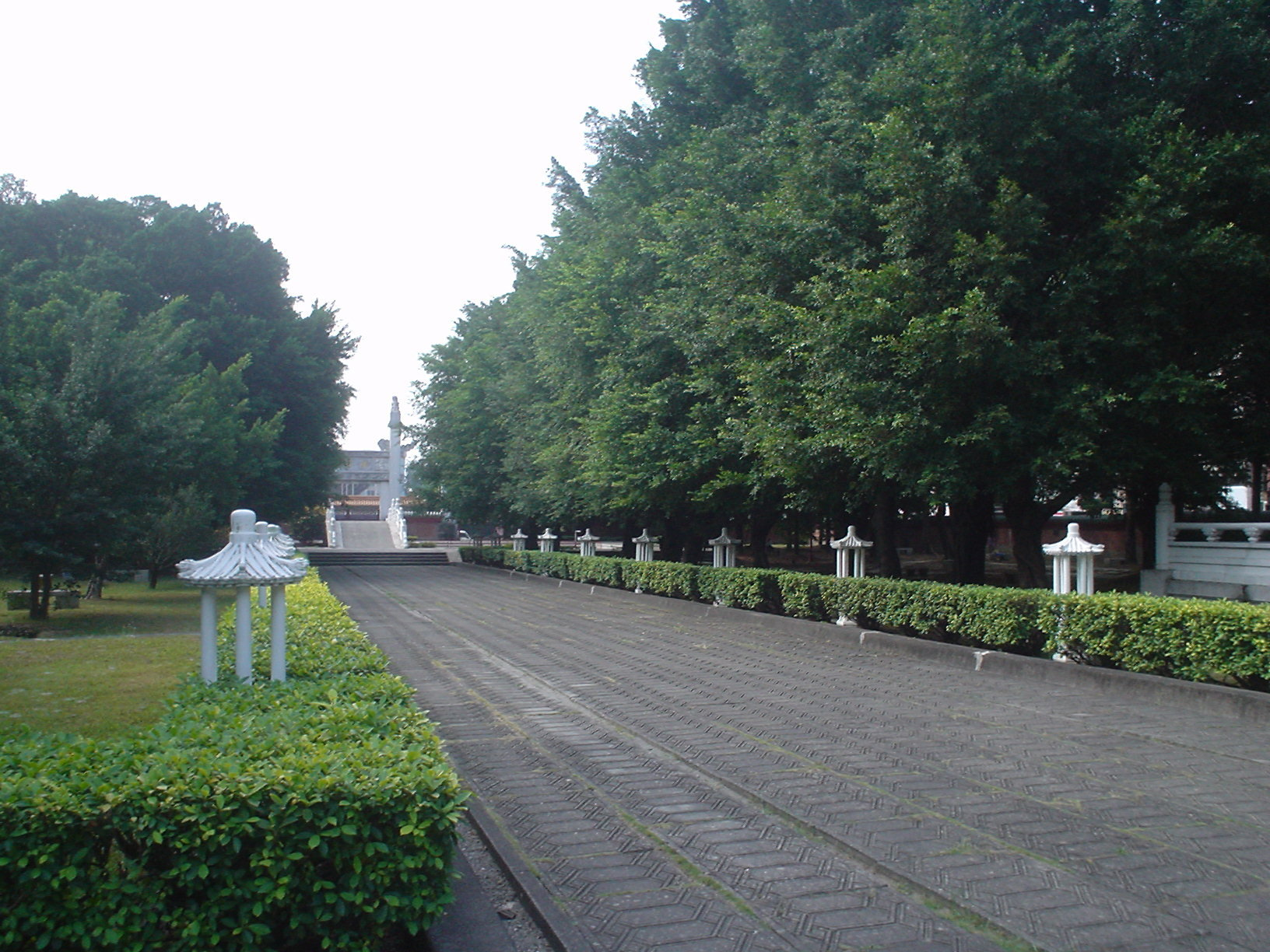
The walkway leading to the Great Perfection Hall

Unlike other cities, Taichung lacked a Confucian temple until very recently. To address this deficiency, the municipal government made the decision to construct a temple. With help from the Taiwan Provincial Government as well as local private individuals, construction of the Taichung Confucian Temple began in 1974 with the laying of the capstone.

Today the temple is a quiet place where people can contemplate, study, and relax. It also serves as a center for culture related classes (i.e. calligraphy). However, the place becomes the center of attention on the morning of September 28 every year, as Taiwanese celebrate Confucius' birthday (officially known as Teachers' Day in Taiwan) with performances at the temple.

The main entrance opens into an open space with trees, a pond, and a walkway lined with hedges that leads to the Great Perfection Gate. The gate itself leads to a larger courtyard inside. Along the perimeter of the courtyard are a series of rooms that are used as offices, classrooms, a library, and a study room for students.

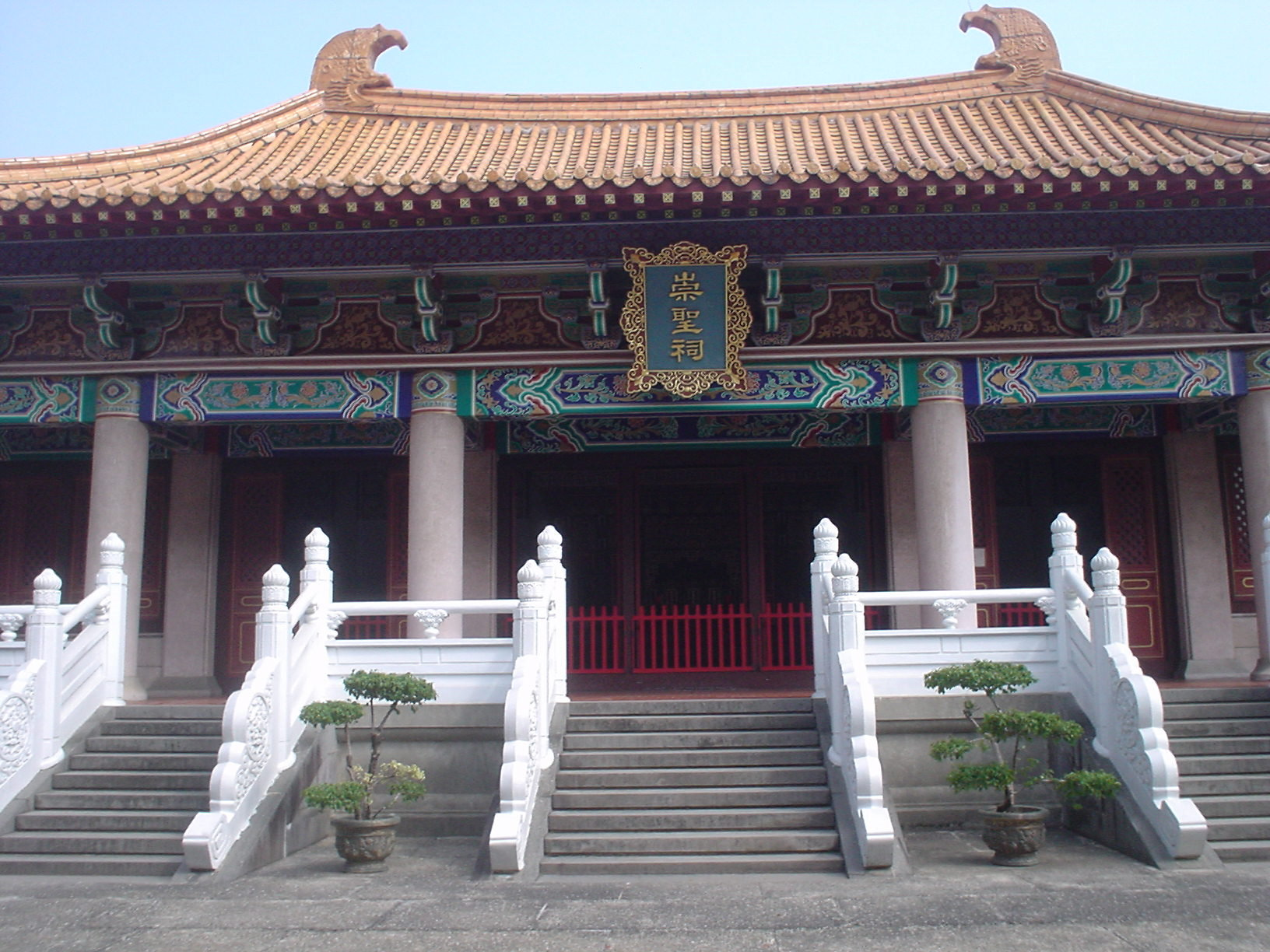
The Sage's Shrine, located in the far rear of the temple complex

In the center of that courtyard is the Great Perfection Hall. The construction employs Song dynasty designs with patterns also deriving from the Song dynasties. It includes a shrine to Confucius, though modestly lacks an image of the great sage.

In the rear of the main courtyard is The Sage's Shrine, also known as the Hall of the Sagely Founder. It includes tablets that honor members of Confucius’ family.

The temple is found along Shangshi Road near the Taichung First Senior High School and the National Physical Education University.

== Family shrines ==
=== Lin Family Ancestral Temple ===
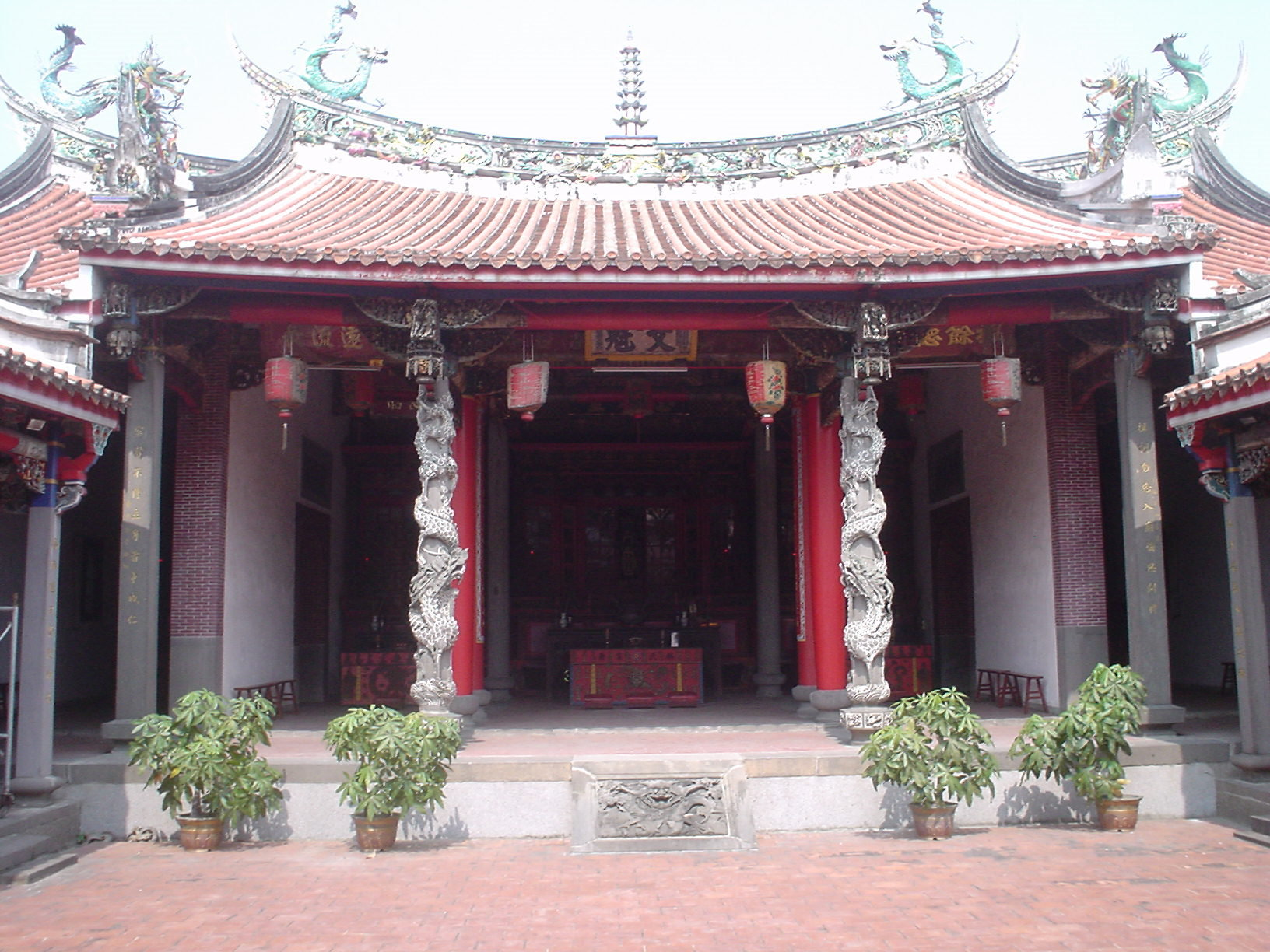
Entrance to the main shrine in the temple.

The Lin Family Ancestral Shrine was first built in what is now Dali District (just south of Taichung City) during the Jiaqing era of the Qing dynasty (1796–1821). It is considered the most important shrine to people with the surname Lin in central Taiwan. It has moved location several times, arriving at its current location in East District, Taichung City in 1930. It is located off a main artery of the city, off Guoguang Road. It is one of several temples in

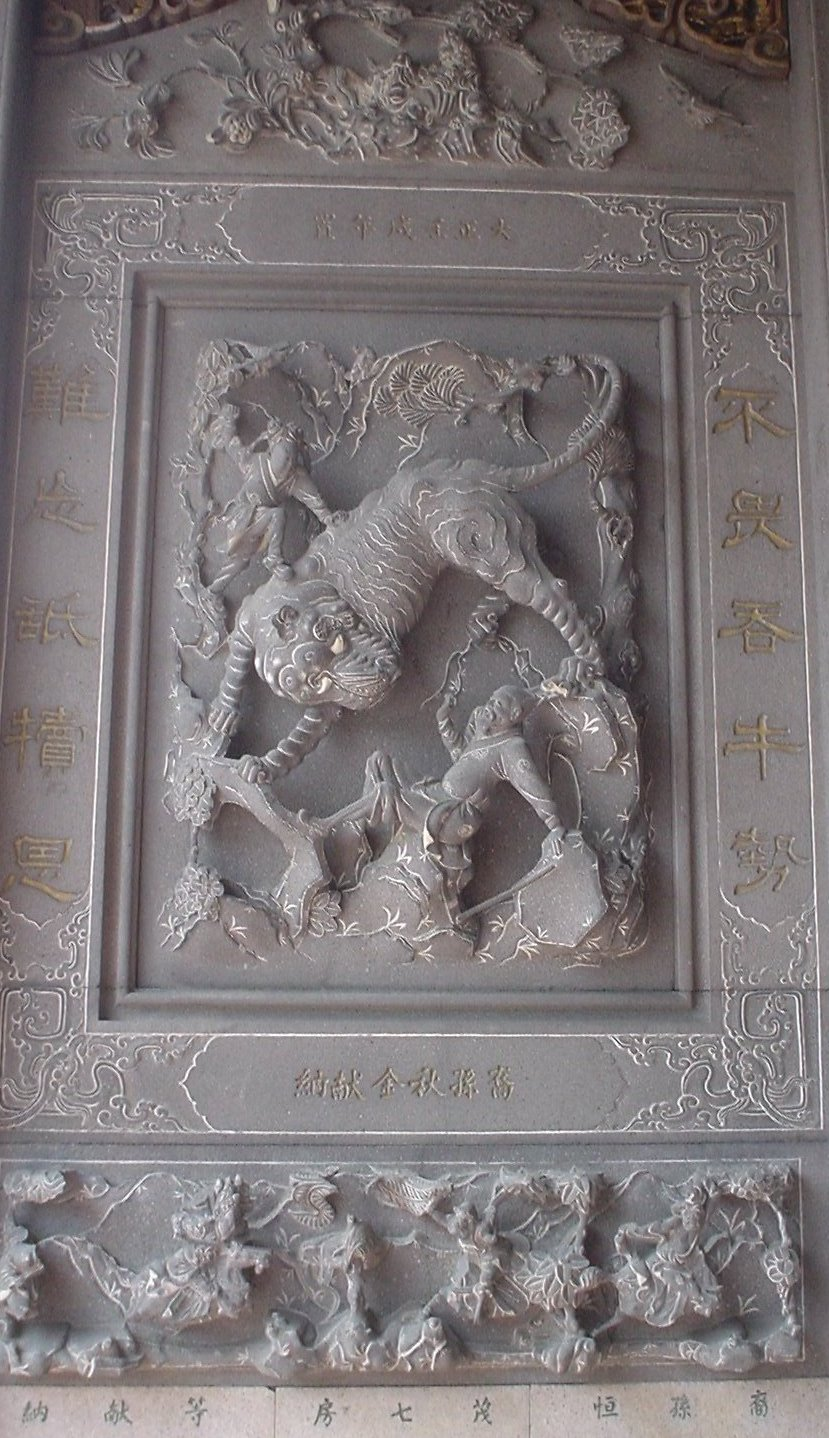
Stone carving inside the temple

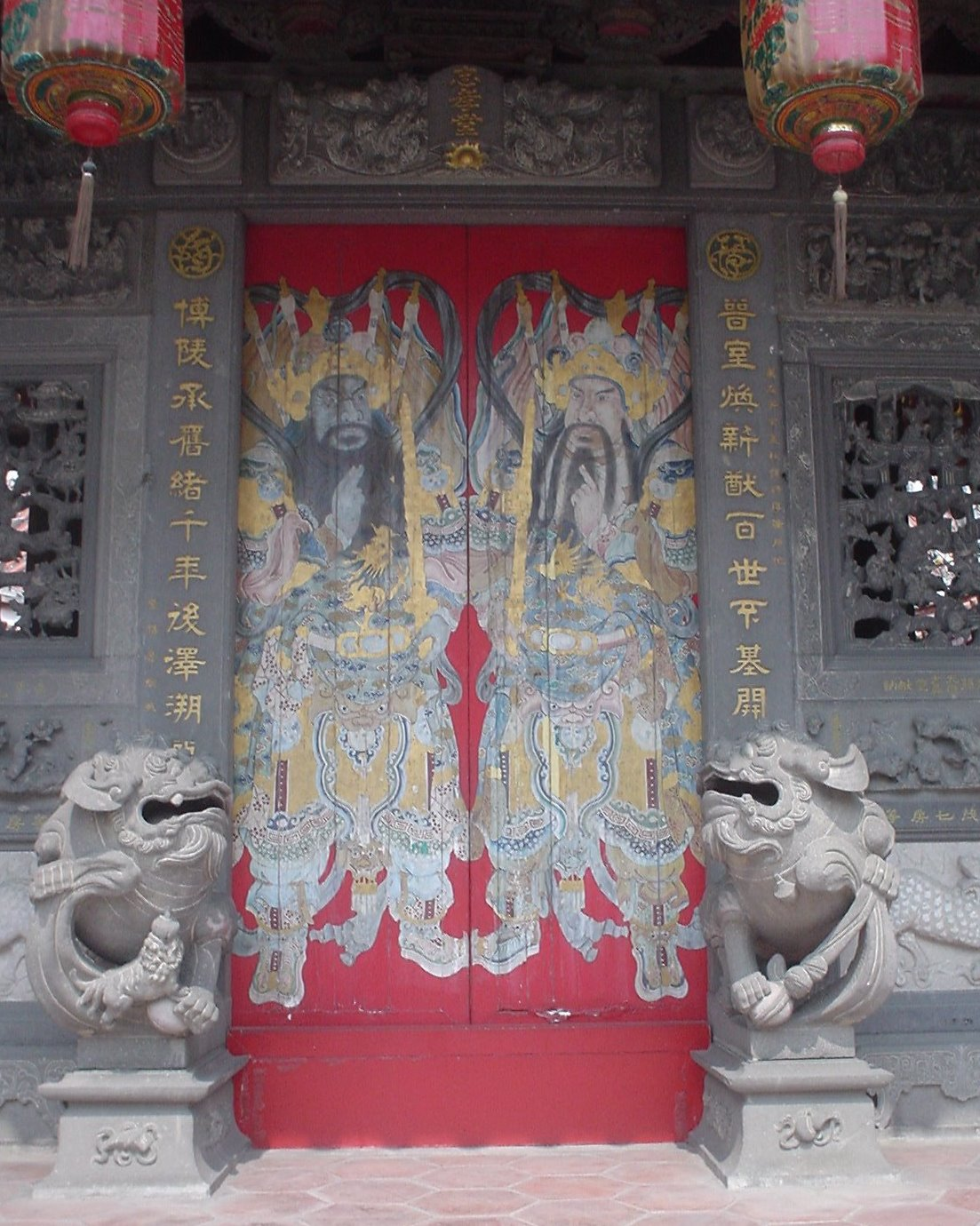
Painting on door inside the temple

Taichung City that have been designated a Category 3 Historical Site by the national government of Taiwan.

The shrine includes stone wall sculptures, wood carvings, and paintings that typify Fujianese design of the mid-Qing dynasty. The outer courtyard has a small brick structure used for burning paper ghost money along with traditional stone guards to protect the sanctity of the temple.

The front entrance has stone carvings on both sides and painting on the doors. The inner courtyard is also made from brick, and one can see the inner shrine from this courtyard. It also includes the traditional drum and bell and has numerous wood carvings and paintings.

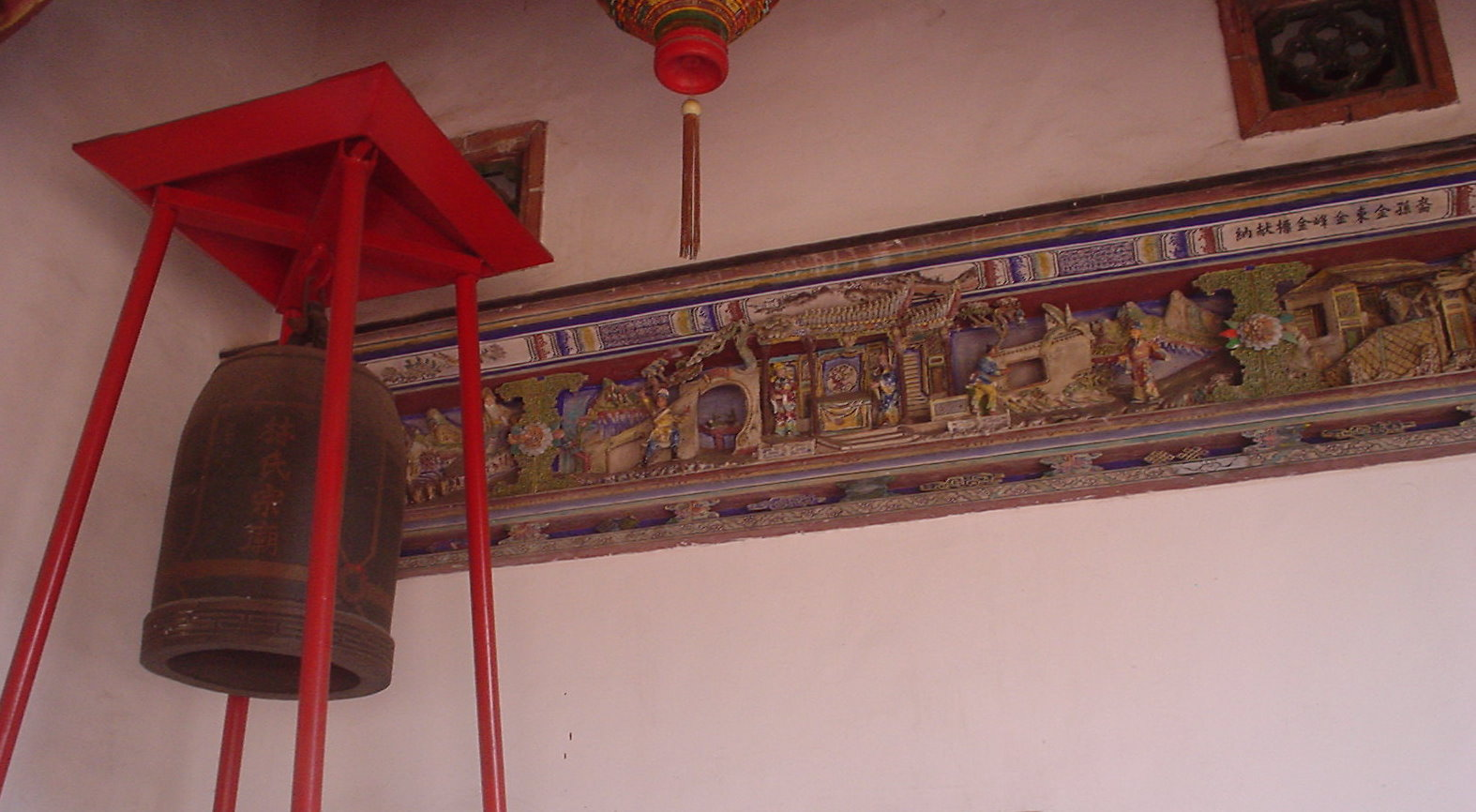
Intricate woodwork inside the temple.

=== Chang-Liao Family Shrine ===
Commonly known as the Chang-Liao Public Hall, it was erected by the Cheng-Liao clan that came from Zhangzhou, Fujian, China. It was built from 1908 to 1911 during the early years of the Japanese occupation. Wings and outlying rooms were added in subsequent years, with all work completed by 1916.

There is a hall with right and left wings, a main worship hall and some enclosed spaces. The woodwork is finely crafted and painted in traditional Qing dynasty styles. What makes this temple special is a lion's throne on the roof beams that are designed to ward off evil influences as well as to stabilize the main beams.

The temple fell into disrepair with age. The Taichung municipal government launched a renovation project that commenced in 1988 and was completed in 1994.

=== Chang (Zhang) Family Shrine ===
The Chang family ancestral Shrine is located in the area formerly known as Hsiachi Changli (today's XieHe li in the XiTun district). This temple was built by descendants of the Matang Chang family of Shibi village, Ninghua country, Dingzhou prefecture, Fujian province.

The Chang (Zhang) family ancestral shrine is built in the traditional Fujianese architectural style. The Zhangzhou master carpenter Chen Ying-shan supervised construction of the wood frame portion. The shrine seeks to perfectly blend architectural aesthetics and structural mechanics, and is a very representative structure of its type. Decoration includes carvings, paintings, calligraphy, cutouts, and clay sculpture; the woodcarvings are particularly notable. The wooden frames of the gateway and central hall contain most of the carvings, which feature such techniques as bas-relief, round relief, and openwork.

The red brick walls of the front hall feature Eight Diagram three-sill bamboo node windows. The outer frames of the windows are decorated with brick carvings. The carving technique and the scenes carved are different on the two sides of the temple.

The straight-sill wooden windows in the brick wall of the main hall are simpler in form than those of the front hall. The large wooden beams making up the internal structure mostly use Yigshan wood. Only the right and left galleries and the areas under the front eaves of the two halls are built with carved and painted beams.

The roof is entirely in the Yingshan style, and the roofs of the two halls and the courtyard doorways in the inner and outer wings have up curved "swallowtails." Because roof tiles had begun falling off this shrine, the Taichung city government acted to protect the city's cultural heritage by starting renovation work in February 1996. This work was completed in April 1998 and cost a total of NT$54 million (approximately US$2.0 million).

Category: Class 3 Type: Temple Announcement date: 11/27/85 Location: 111 Anhe Rd., XiTun Dist., Taichung Visitor hours: Inquire by telephone before visiting.

== Buddhist temples ==
=== Bao Jue Buddhist Temple ===
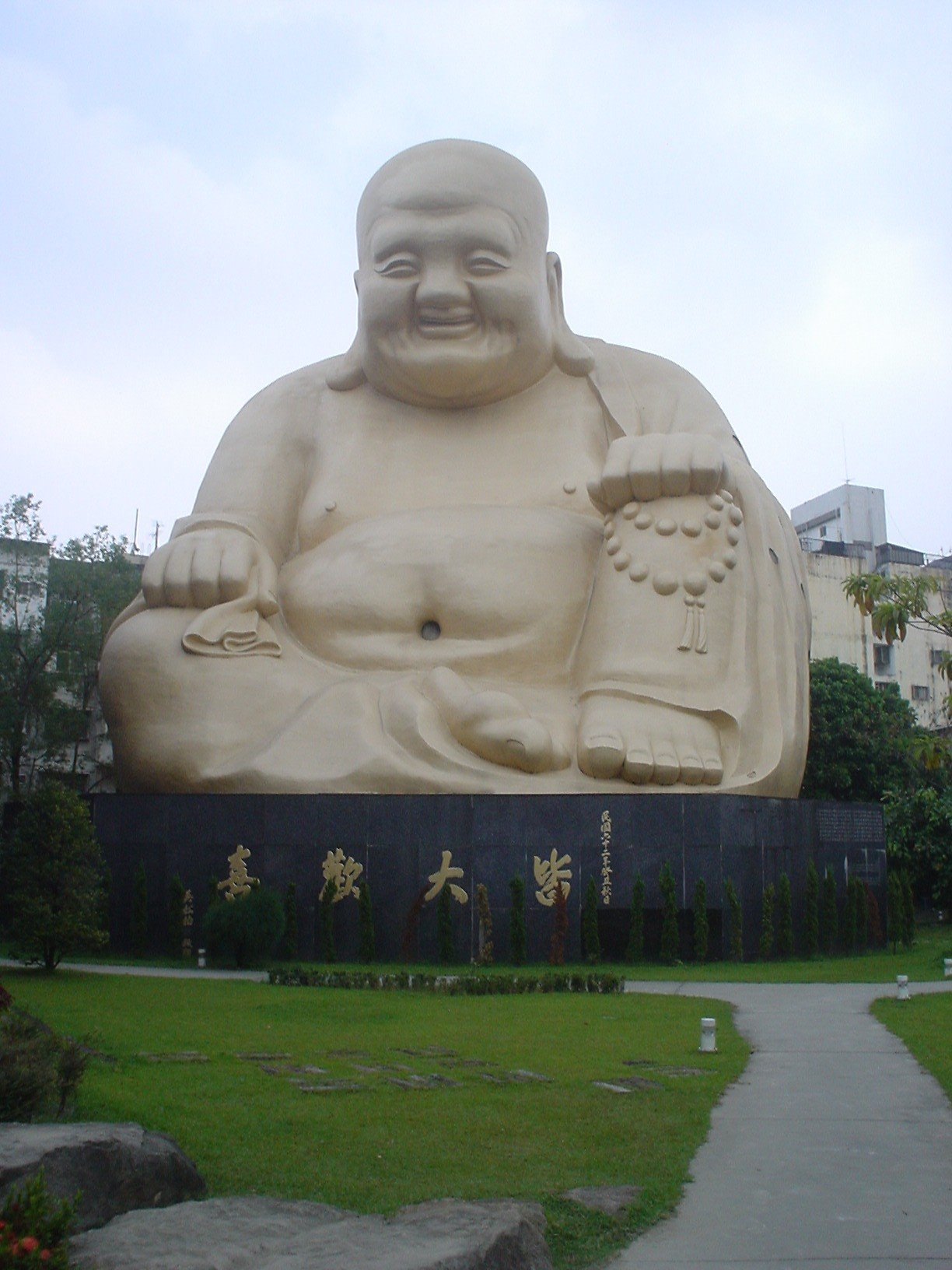

The Bao Jue Buddhist temple is unusual in that it is the only one in the city that also has a Shinto Shrine on its grounds. It is famous for the presence of a giant smiling Buddha that can easily be seen from the street despite the presence of a wall separating the grounds from the street. The main temple itself is undergoing renovation. There are two other buildings on the grounds that are used for community-oriented activities.

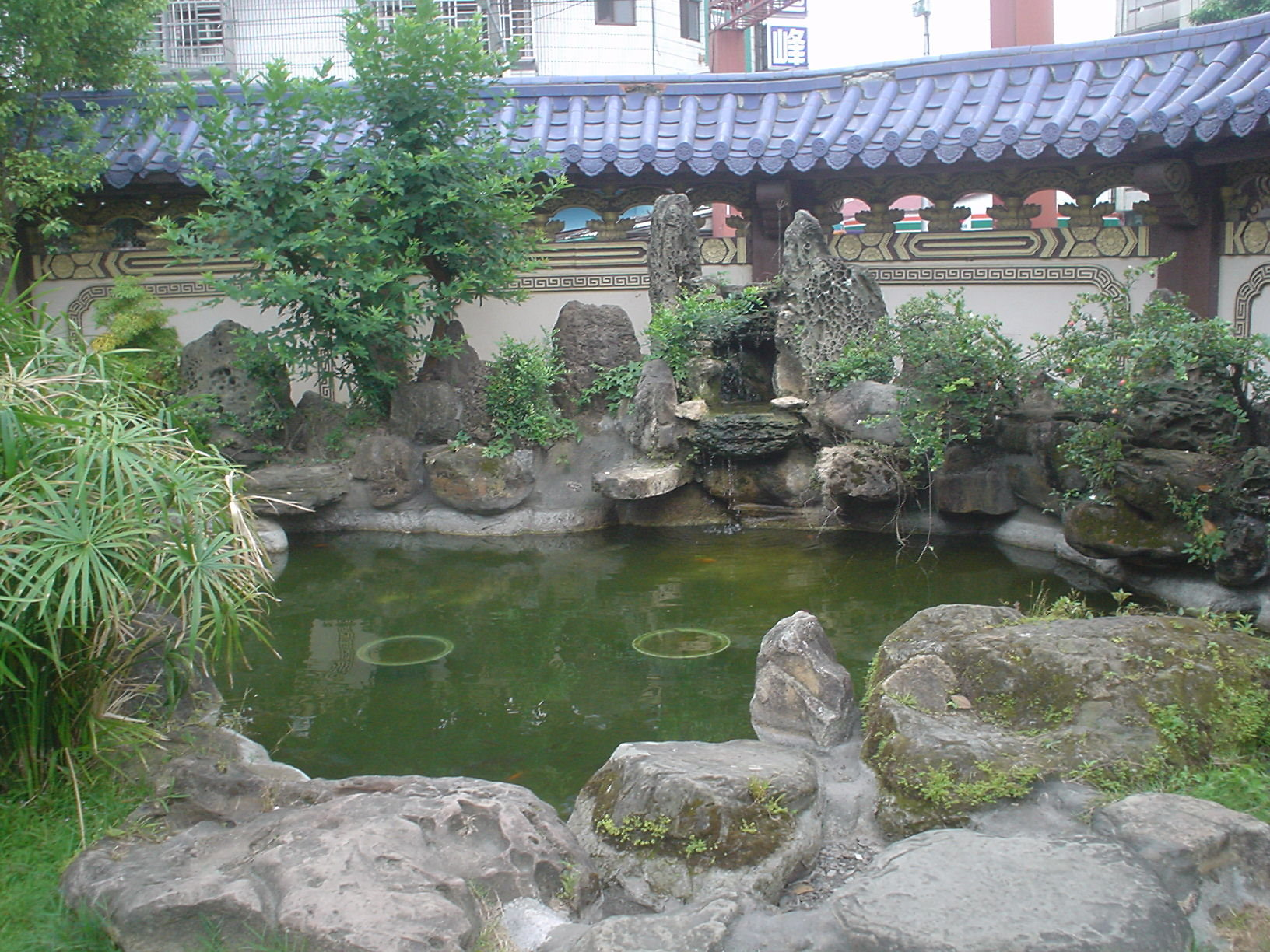

=== Tzu-shan Buddhist Temple ===
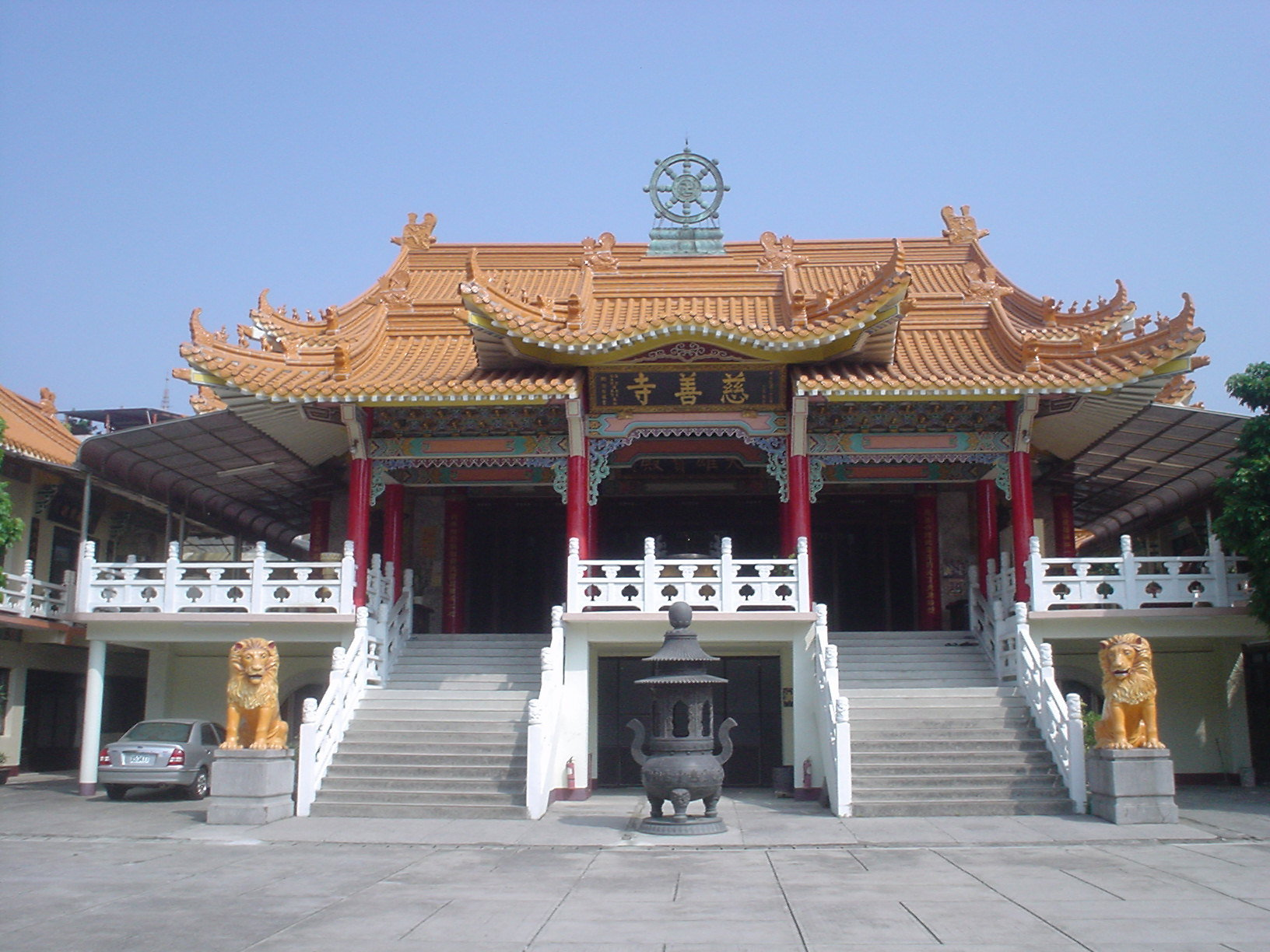

The Tzu-shan Buddhist Temple was constructed shortly after the end of the Japanese occupation in the 1950s. It is a temple/monastery with a small number of resident Buddhist monks and nuns. The entrance to the complex has an elephant on either side.

Inside there is a courtyard with the main temple on the right side with lions guarding the entrance to the temple. Inside the temple is a gold Buddha statue sitting in the lotus position. There are hundreds of smaller figurines lining the walls of the shrine.

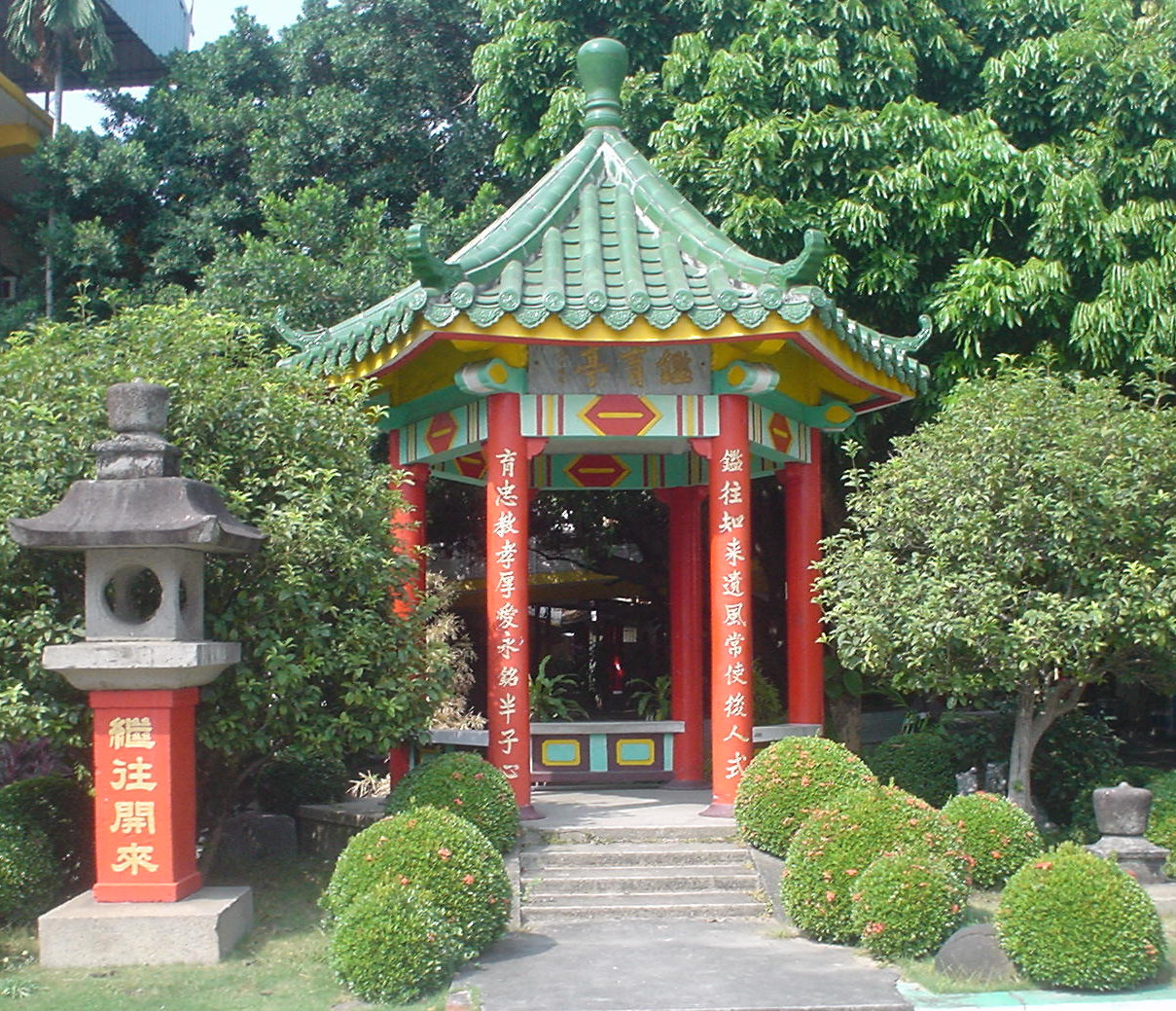

The back area of the courtyard has a small pavilion with greenery behind it. Within that greenery is another courtyard where monks and nuns meditate, study, or relax. Within the courtyard, there is an opening to a green area with a statue of the Guanyin Bodhisattva. The monastery area behind the second courtyard has residences for the monks and nuns in residence.

The temple is in an out of the way area in Beitun District on a small road near Changping Road.

== Taoist temples ==
=== Wen Chang Temple ===
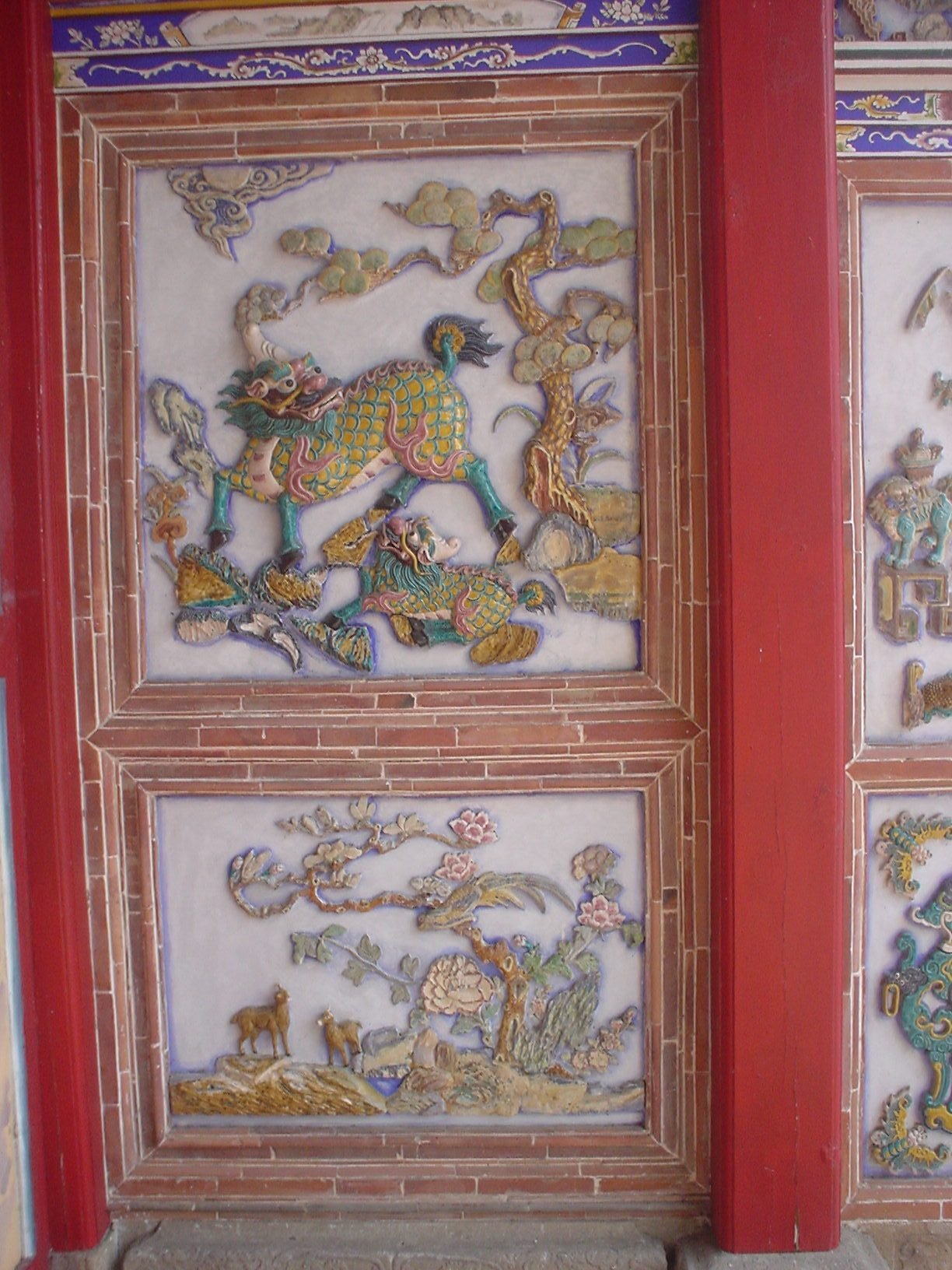

Wen Chang Temple is located in what is today Beitun District in northern Taichung City. The location of the temple is the heart of what was once known as An Li village, populated by the Pazea Pingpu Aboriginal tribe. Chinese exploration of this area dates back to the late years of the reign of the Kangxi Emperor (1723–1735).

By the end of the eighteenth century, Minnan (Hokkien) settlers created wenwei (learning groups) communities. After some time, in 1863, they decided to construct the temple to cultivate local learning talents.

After entering a gate on the modern roadside of Changping Road, a courtyard looks towards a broader gate. The gate has wooden carvings on either side of the entrances that lead into another courtyard. From that second courtyard, the main shrine to Wenchang Tichun can be seen.

A two-year renovation project led by a team from Tunghai University restored the temple from 1996 to 1998, but the 1999 Jiji earthquake caused several cracks to appear in the structure. Repairs took place from 2002 to 2004.

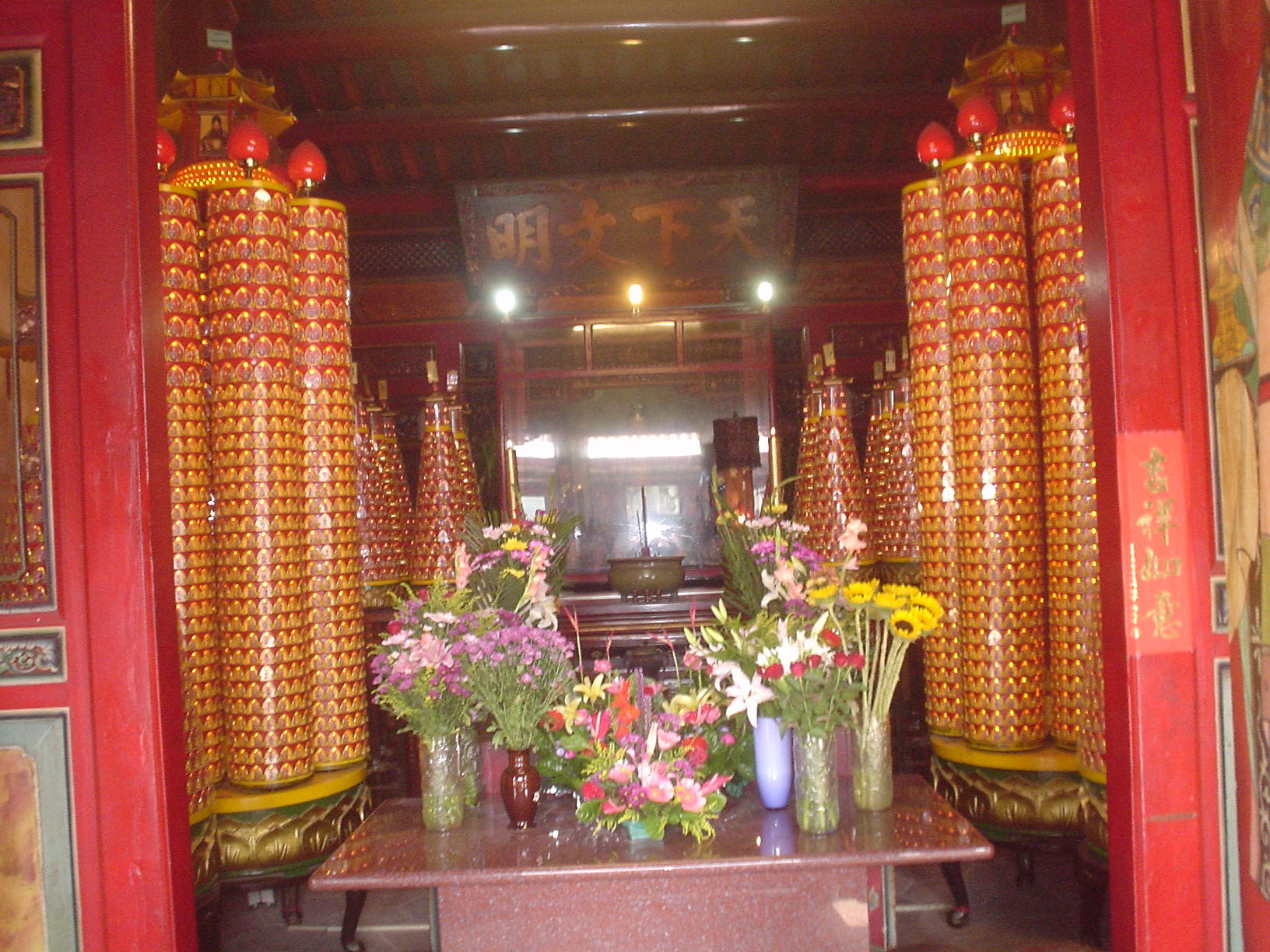

=== Yuanbao Temple ===
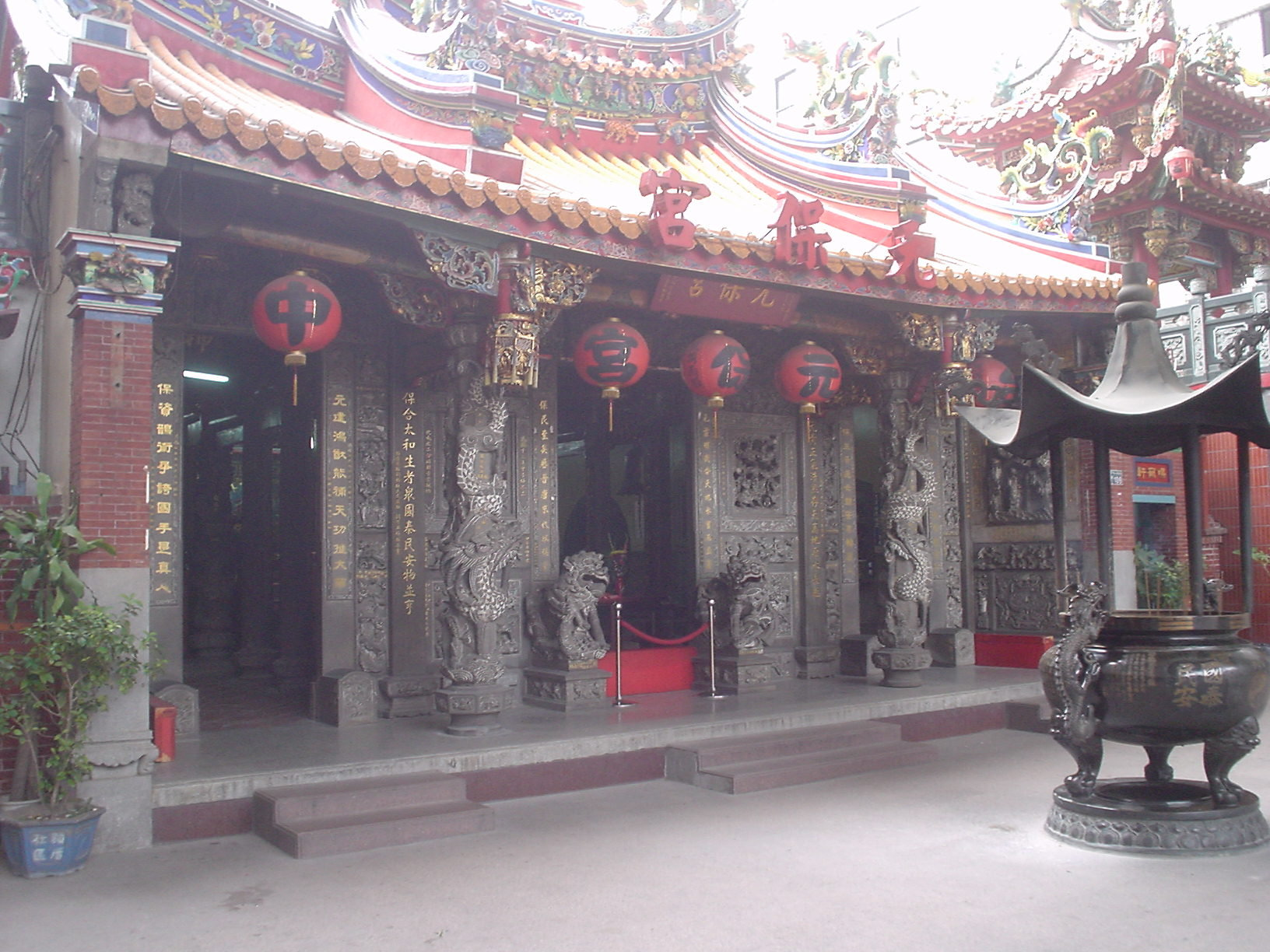

The Yuanbao Temple itself is small. Just outside the temple, an old tree stands beside the main gate. The gate itself has an intricate design on the top. Inside the small courtyard is a wrought iron Joss paper furnace. The entrance to the temple itself has more traditional multicolored wood carvings.

Behind the temple itself is a multi-storied building that belongs to the temple and is called the Dadao Public Temple. However, there is no aesthetic architectural or artistic quality to the building.

=== Nantian Temple ===
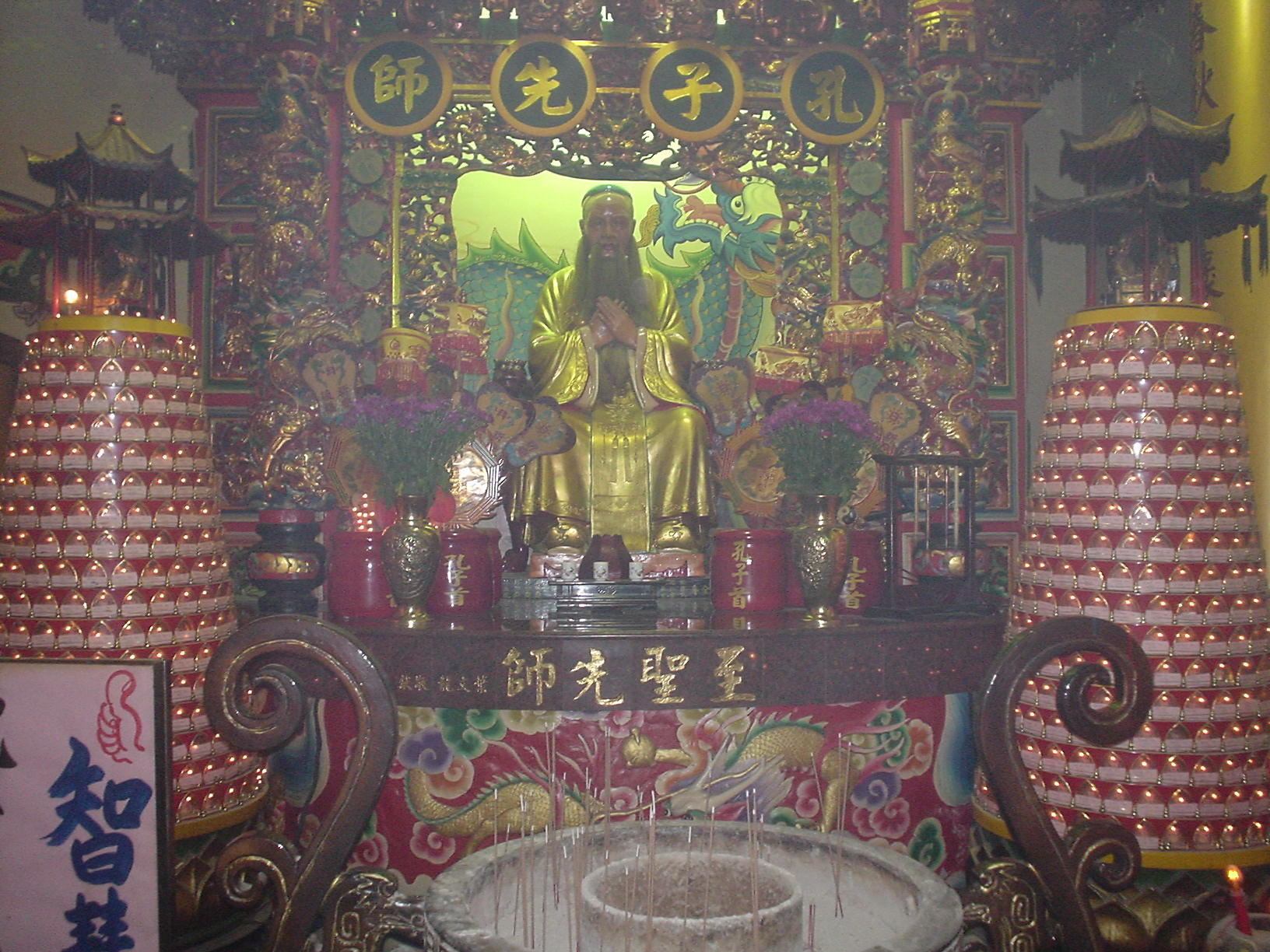

The Nantian Temple is one of the most distinguishable temples in Taichung due to the presence of a large red representation of the spirit Guan Gong that figures prominently above the temple and can be seen from at least a kilometer away.

While this temple is currently located on Ziyou Road near the Hanxi River and Lecheng Temple, it was originally built on Dacheng Street in North District in 1949 and it received the name Nantian Temple in 1950, with construction being completed in 1952. The spirit on the roof was constructed in 1984.

The interior of the temple not only includes a Taoist shrine dedicated to Guangong, but one of the side rooms also has a shrine dedicated to Confucius.

== Mazu temples ==
=== Dajia Jenn Lann Temple ===
Dajia Jenn Lann Temple is known for being the center of the largest annual religious procession in Taiwan, the annual Mazu pilgrimage in which practitioners travel across the island bearing an effigy of Mazu.

=== Leh Cherng Temple ===
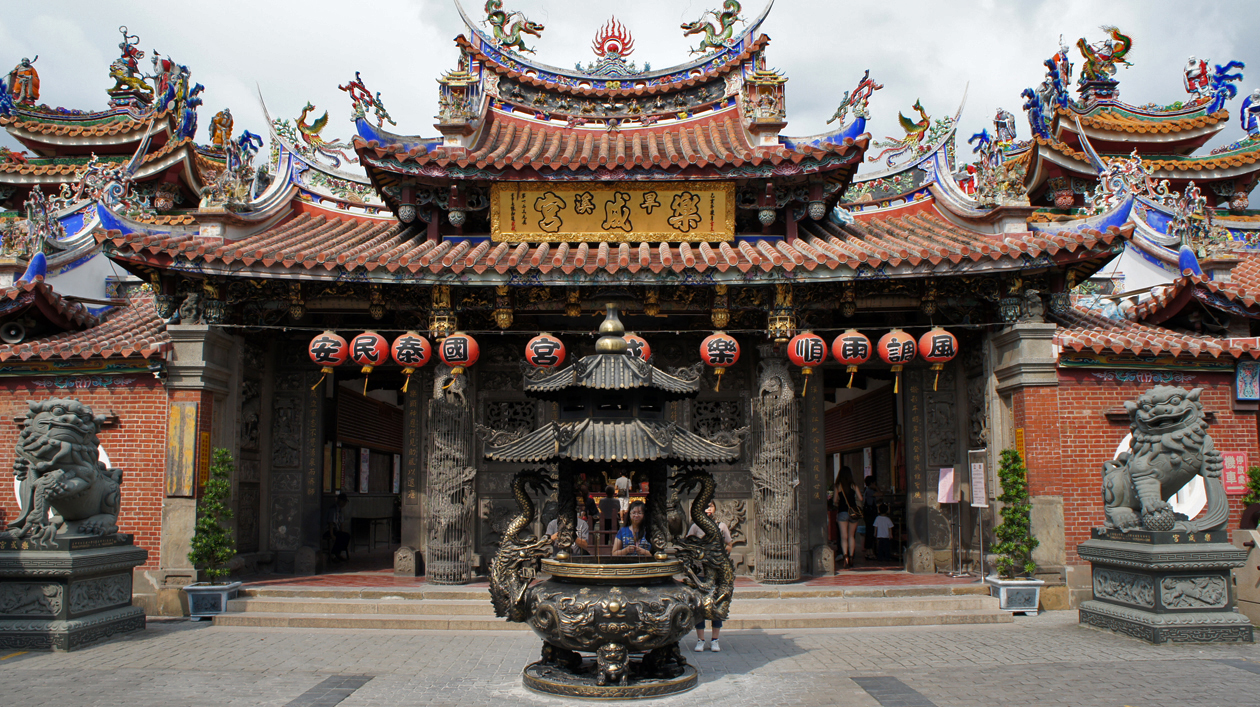
The Lecheng Temple entrance

The Leh Cherng or Lecheng Temple, also known as the Heihsi Matsu Temple, the temporary temple that was initially authorized by the Meichou Matsu temple in Fujian Province, China was constructed early in the Qianlong era (1735–1796) of the Qing dynasty. However, it was not long before the original structure was inadequate to accommodate the large number of worshippers. Thus, another temple was built on the current site near Hanxi Village, in what is now the East District of Taichung City in 1791. Restoration work was performed on the temple in 1928 and 1963. Thus, now only are there examples of Qing dynasty architecture, but also more modern forms as a result of the restoration and additions that took place during the Japanese colonial era as well as the Chinese KMT era. This two-storey structure is among the largest and most ornate temples in Taichung.

To the left of the main temple structure is an incense burner where ghost money can be burned for the deceased, which was built in 1828. The interior of the temple includes shrines to “spirits” with intricate, complex designs. The complex roofs are constructed in a traditional Chinese style and include wood carvings, including dragons, lions, as well as sculptures of people. Opposite the main temple is a gallery where there are small vendors today. In the courtyard in front of the temple is a pair of green stone lions, indicating the antiquity of the temple. Lecheng Temple has been declared a category three historical site by Taiwan’s national government. It is very busy during national holidays and as well as the first and fifteenth days of each lunar month. It is located on Hanxi Street near the Han River in eastern Taichung.

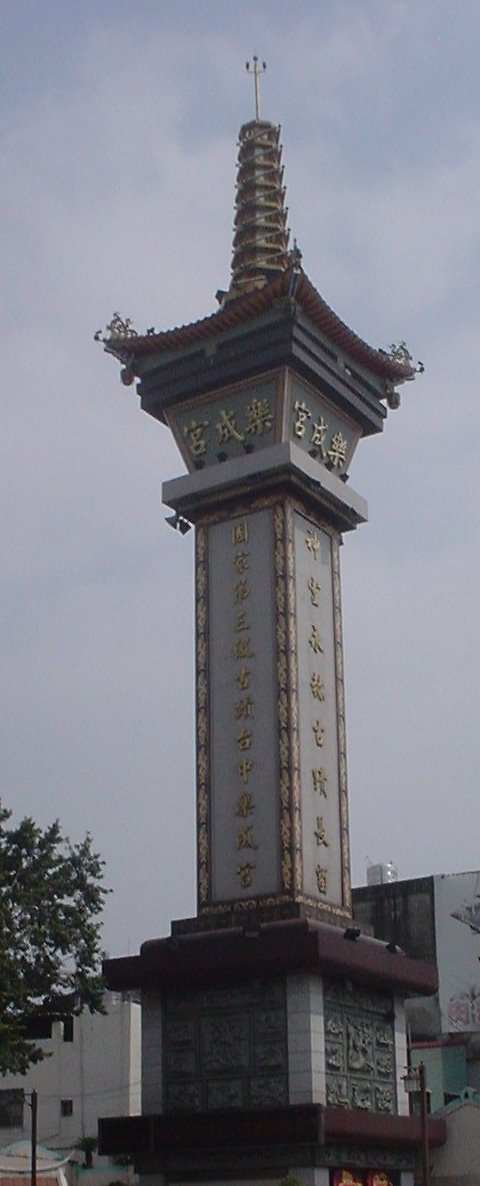
Marker showing the temple as a Category 3 National Historical Site

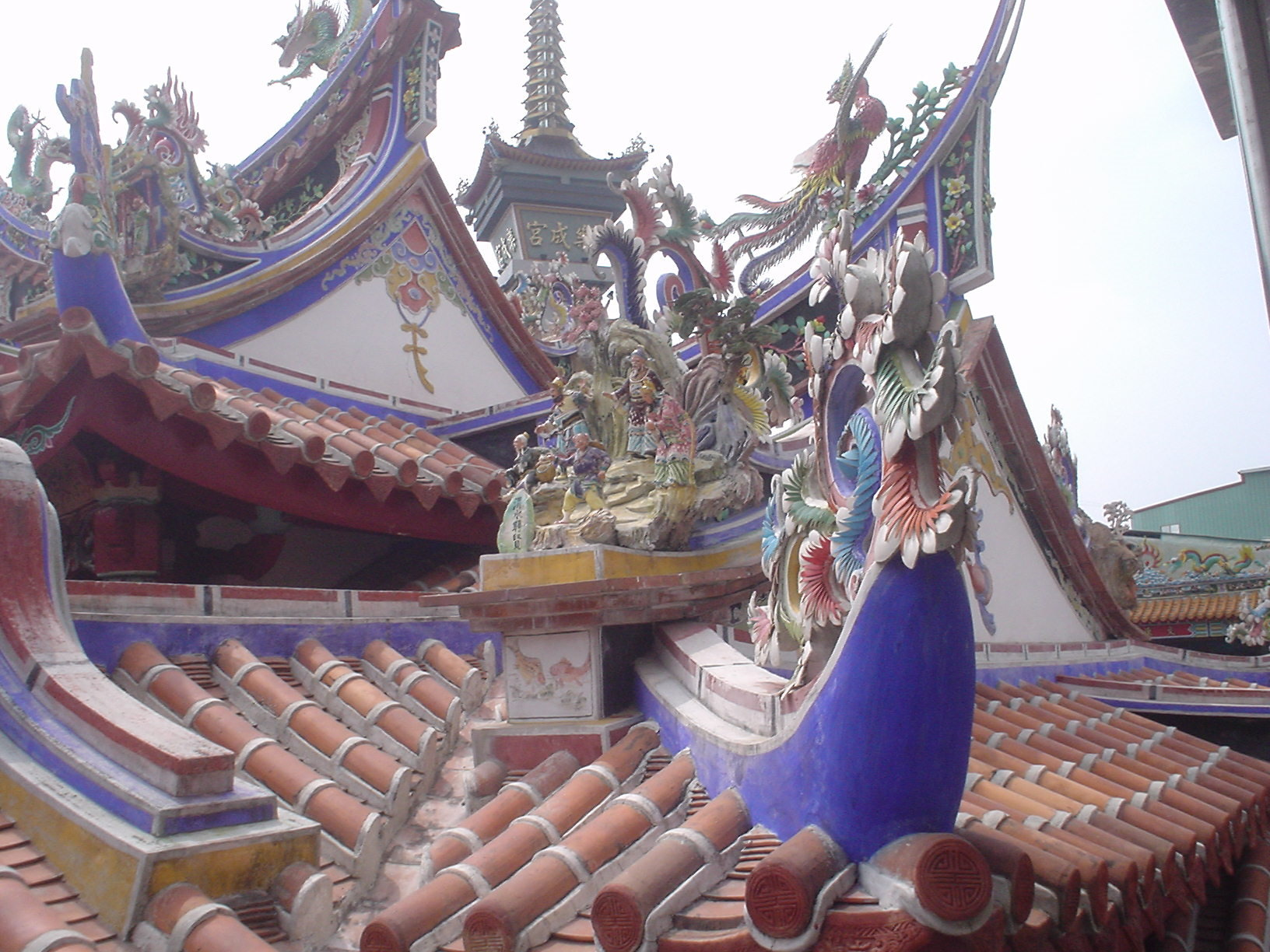
Dragon wood carving

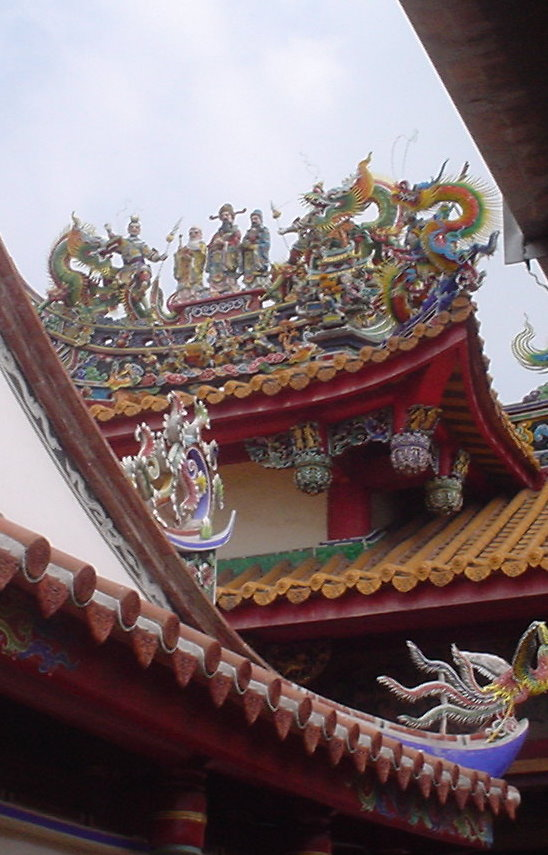
Intricate roof carvings

=== Wanhe Temple ===
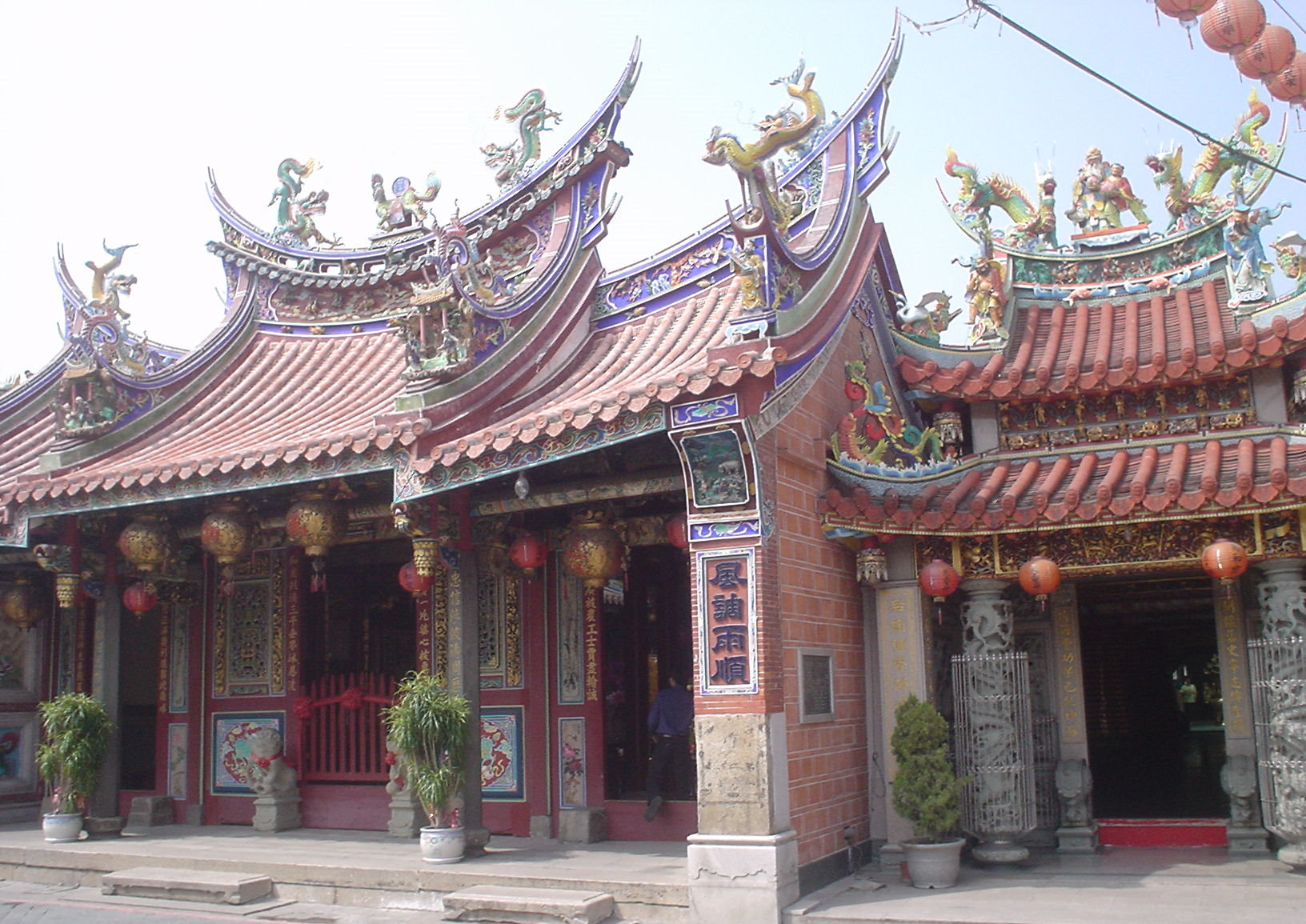
The Wanhe Temple

The Wanhe Temple is situated in the heart of historic Nantun Village, within the boundaries of Nantun District in Taichung. It was completed in 1726, forty-two years after the Qing dynasty conquered most of western Taiwan. Like many of the oldest temples in Taiwan, it is in thanks to the spirit Mazu.

The main entrance to the temple is flanked on either side by two smaller entrances. Wood carvings adorn the traditional roof structures over the entrances to the temple. The interior has a number of shrines dedicated to Mazu that were constructed over the course of the next century and a half.

This temple is busy on holidays as people go to pray and dedicate themselves to Mazu and their ancestors. It is located in one of the major traditional population centers of modern Taichung.

=== Haotian Temple ===
Dazhuang Haotian Temple (Chinese: 大庄浩天宮; pinyin: Dàzhuāng Hàotiān Gōng) is a temple located in Dazhuang, Wuqi District, Taichung.

== Shinto shrines ==
There were numerous Shinto shrines in Taichung constructed during the times of Japanese rule (1896-1945), most of them are nonexistent today. However, the Bao Jue Buddhist Temple still has a Shinto Shrine on its grounds.
