= Halsey Institute of Contemporary Art =

Art museum in Charleston, South Carolina

The Halsey Institute of Contemporary Art
- Former name: Halsey Gallery
- Established: 1983
- Location: 161 Calhoun Street; Charleston, South Carolina; 32.7851°N 79.9373°W
- Type: Art Museum
- Owner: College of Charleston
- Website: halsey.cofc.edu

The Halsey Institute of Contemporary Art (HICA or "the Halsey") is a non-profit, non-collecting contemporary art institute within the School of the Arts at the College of Charleston in Charleston, South Carolina. The HICA presents contemporary art exhibitions by emerging and mid-career artists. The Halsey is housed in the Marion and Wayland H. Cato Jr. Center for the Arts at 161 Calhoun Street, in the heart of downtown Charleston. Mark Sloan was Director and Chief Curator of the Halsey from 1994 to 2020. Katie Hirsch served as Director and Chief Curator from 2021 to 2024.

In addition to exhibitions, the Halsey presents a publishing program, visiting-artist lectures, a membership program, a reference library, film screenings, and an educational outreach program.

== History ==
The Halsey Institute was originally named the Halsey Gallery after artist William Halsey, an accomplished Charleston native whose modernist works were exhibited at the Museum of Modern Art, the Whitney Museum of American Art, the Art Institute of Chicago, and the Metropolitan Museum of Art. Halsey was the first individual to teach a studio art course at the College of Charleston, beginning in 1964. Upon his retirement in 1984, the Studio Art faculty voted to name the art gallery after him to honor his contribution to the arts in Charleston. William Halsey died in 1999, the same year he was awarded the Elizabeth O’Neill Verner Award.

Halsey's wife Corrie McCallum was an artist and educator. She was the first artist to teach printmaking at the College of Charleston. Under her guidance, the Gibbes Museum of Art conducted the first comprehensive art appreciation program for Charleston County public school students. She held education positions at several institutions, including the Telfair Museum of Art in Savannah, the Gibbes Museum of Art at the College of Charleston, and Newberry College in South Carolina. Throughout her life, McCallum remained an outspoken advocate for the visual arts, and was awarded the Elizabeth O’Neill Verner Award in 2003. She died in 2009.

Since 1984, the gallery bearing the Halsey name has presented exhibitions by regional, national, and international artists. In 2005, the gallery changed its name to the Halsey Institute of Contemporary Art to reflect the broad range of programming produced.

In 2009, the Halsey Institute moved into an expanded gallery space in the newly constructed Marion and Wayland H. Cato Jr. Center, anchoring the first floor of the new arts building. In 2012, the South Carolina Arts Commission presented the Halsey Institute the Elizabeth O’Neill Verner Award with special recognition to director Mark Sloan. In 2018, Charleston Mayor John Tecklenburg declared March 14 as William Halsey and Corrie McCallum Day in Charleston.

== Programming ==
=== Exhibitions ===
The Halsey regularly features emerging, mid-career, and "oddly overlooked" artists. Over its history, HICA has produced more than 275 exhibitions and shown work from more than 2,000 artists. Behind-the-scenes videos are often commissioned to accompany an exhibition, giving visitors an in-depth view into the life and working method of an exhibiting artist.

=== International Artist-In-Residence Program ===
The Halsey Institute of Contemporary Art often hosts an artist-in-residence for the period of a few weeks to several months. During their residencies, artists have the unique opportunity to work on-site to produce new works of art to be exhibited at the Halsey Institute. The artist in-residence engages with the local community through lectures, workshops, and other public events. Past artists-in-residence include Chen Long-bin, Tiebena Dagnogo, Eames Demetrios, Rikuo Ueda, Motoi Yamamoto, Hung Liu, Lonnie Holley, Renee Stout, Jumaadi, Kendall Messick, and Patricia Boinest Potter, among others.

=== Looking To See Tours ===
Established in 2010 and supported by The Henry and Sylvia Yaschik Foundation, HICA Looking to See program's free tours provide a guided and structured view of the current exhibition(s) to Charleston-area K–12 students via after-school programs, youth and or community groups.

=== Artist Lectures ===
Accompanying each exhibition, and, depending on the artist and their work, lectures occur in the form of a gallery walkthrough with the artist and the curator of the exhibition, or in a more formal presentation. These opportunities provide the public a chance to connect with the artist in person, ask questions, and to understand the exhibition from the artist's perspective. Additional special lectures occur throughout the year by invited visiting artists or College of Charleston faculty.

== Publications ==
The Halsey has an active publishing program, often producing full-color catalogues to complement exhibitions. HICA publications have received numerous awards from American Alliance of Museums, the American Art Libraries Association, Graphis, Communication Arts, and the South Carolina State Library. Recent publications are listed below:

- Kukuli Velarde: CORPUS (2022) ISBN 9781792349195
- Namsa Leuba: Crossed Looks (2021) ISBN 9788862087520
- Infra/Ultra: The Notebooks of Don ZanFagna (2021) ISBN 9781792349188
- The Carrion Cheer, A Faunistic Tragedy (2019) ISBN 9783903269118
- Marc Trujillo: American Purgatory (2019) ISBN 9781532384653
- Southbound: Photographs of and about the New South (2018) ISBN 978-1-532-35053-5
- Force of Nature: Site Installations by Ten Japanese Artists (2007) ISBN 1-89-057307-8
- Aldwyth: work v. / work n. Collage and Assemblage 1991–2009 (2009) ISBN 978-0-615-26885-9
- Palmetto Portraits Project (2010) ISBN 978-0-615-35474-3
- Leslie Wayne: Recent Work (2011) ISBN 978-1-450-75586-3
- Tanja Softic: Migrant Universe (2011) ISBN 978-1-450-79204-2
- Aggie Zed: Keeper's Keep (2012) ISBN 978-1-467-50790-5
- Return to the Sea: Saltworks by Motoi Yamamoto (2012) ISBN 978-1-467-52127-7
- The Paternal Suit: Heirlooms from the F. Scott Hess Family Foundation (2012) ISBN 978-1-467-53813-8
- Pulse Dome Project: Art and Design by Don ZanFagna (2012) ISBN 978-1-4675-5016-1
- Renée Stout: Tales of the Conjure Woman (2013) ISBN 978-1-467-58678-8
- Rebound: Dissections and Excavations in Book Art (2013) ISBN 978-1-467-57448-8
- Ruth Marten—The Unvarnished Truth: Works 2007–2013 (2014) ISBN 978-3-9815348-8-7
- Patricia Boinest Potter: Patterns of Place (2015) ISBN 978-1-467-57448-8
- Something to Take My Place: The Art of Lonnie Holley (2015) ISBN 978-1-467-57448-8
- Sons and Father: Engravings by John McWilliams (2016)
- Across the Threshold of India: Art, Women, and Culture (2016) ISBN 978-1-938-08617-5
- Jiha Moon: Double Welcome, Most Everyone's Mad Here (2017) ISBN 978-1-5323-2682-0
- Visible Man: Fahamu Pecou (2017) ISBN 978-1-5323-4507-4
- Bob Trotman: Business as Usual (2017) ISBN 978-1-4951-2864-6
