= Taichung Metropolitan Park =

Park in Xitun, Taichung, Taiwan

- 臺中都會公園
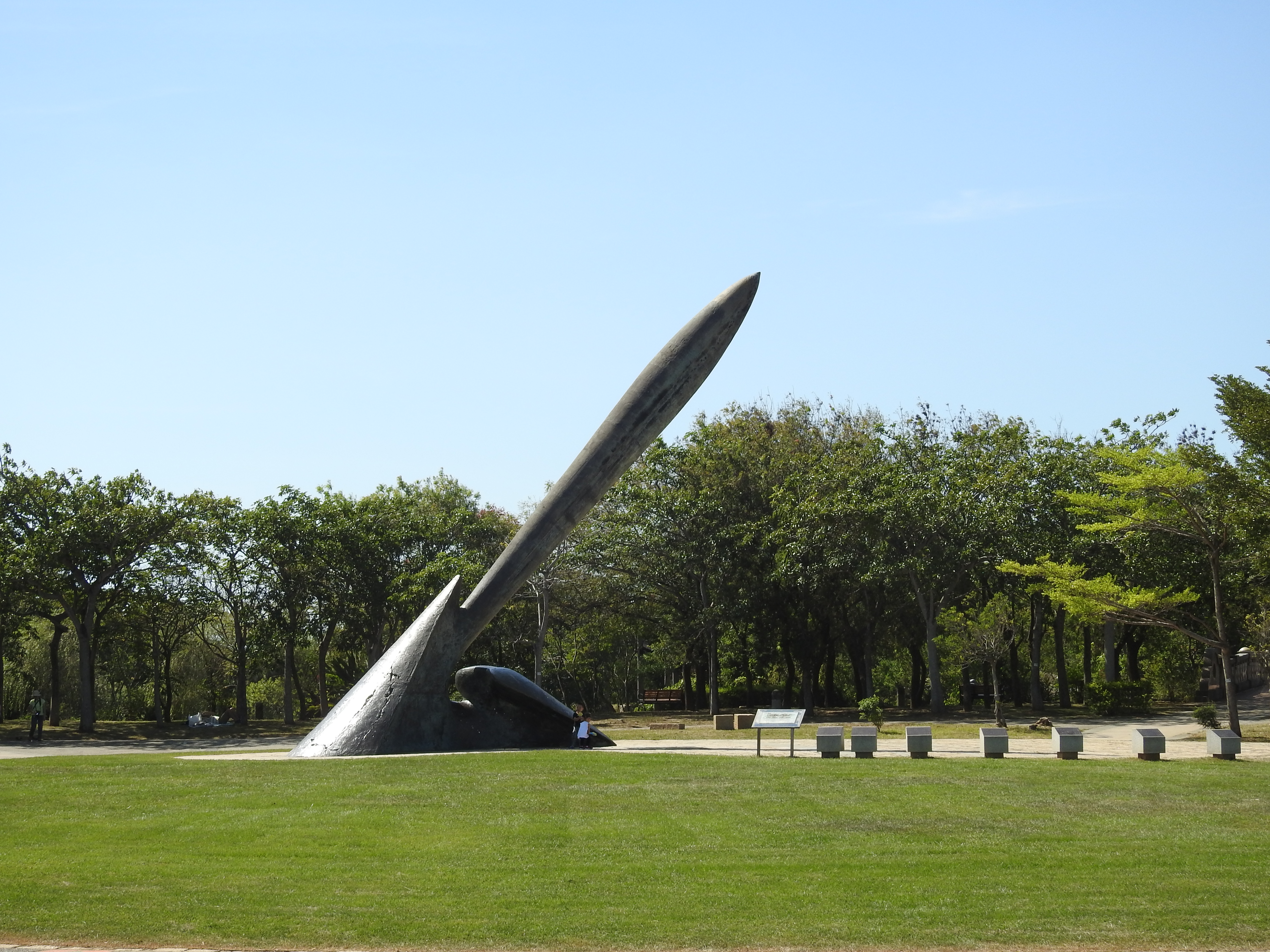
- Interactive map of Taichung Metropolitan Park
- Type: urban park
- Location: Xitun, Taichung, Taiwan
- Coordinates: 24°12′28.6″N 120°35′49.4″E
- Area: 88 hectares (220 acres)
- Elevation: 310 m (1,020 ft)
- Website: Official website

The Taichung Metropolitan Park (Chinese: 臺中都會公園; pinyin: Táizhōng Dūhuì Gōngyuán) is an urban park in Xitun District, Taichung, Taiwan.

== Geography ==
The park has an area of 88 hectares and located at the top of Dadu Plateau with an altitude of 310 meters.

== Architecture ==
The park consists of plants observation area, sundial, therapeutic waterway, ecological pond, moon corridor, star observation plaza, aromatic and nectarous plant area etc. It has also facilities such as visitor center, exhibition room, physical fitness activity area, outdoor show performing plaza and audiovisual room.

== Transportation ==
The park is accessible by bus from Taichung Station of Taiwan Railway.

== See also ==
- List of parks in Taiwan
