= Huilai Monument Archaeology Park =

Archaeological site in Xitun, Taichung, Taiwan

- 惠來遺址 (Chinese)
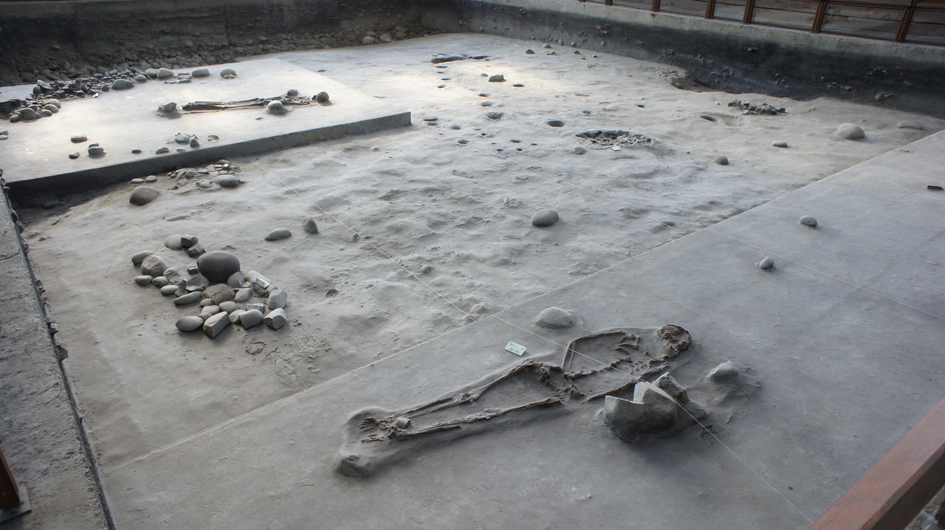

- Location within Taichung
- 24°09′43.2″N 120°38′11.2″E
- Type: archaeological site
- Location: Xitun, Taichung, Taiwan

Site notes
- Area: 150 ha (370 acres)
- Discovered: 2002

Huilai Monument Archaeology Park (traditional Chinese: 惠來遺址; simplified Chinese: 惠来遗址; pinyin: Huìlái Yízhǐ) is an archaeological site at Xitun District, Taichung, Taiwan.

== History ==
The site was discovered by Tunghai University student Chen Sheng-ming in 2002. Further investigation revealed the site coverage to be 1,500,000 m^{2} and the Taichung City Government declared the area to be a City Archaeological Area. Later on, the city government decided to turn the area into a park and manufactured a replica of the excavation site.

== See also ==
- Prehistory of Taiwan
