= Savoy Palace (skyscraper) =

Residential skyscraper in Xitun District of Taichung, Taiwan

Savoy Palace 聯聚保和大廈
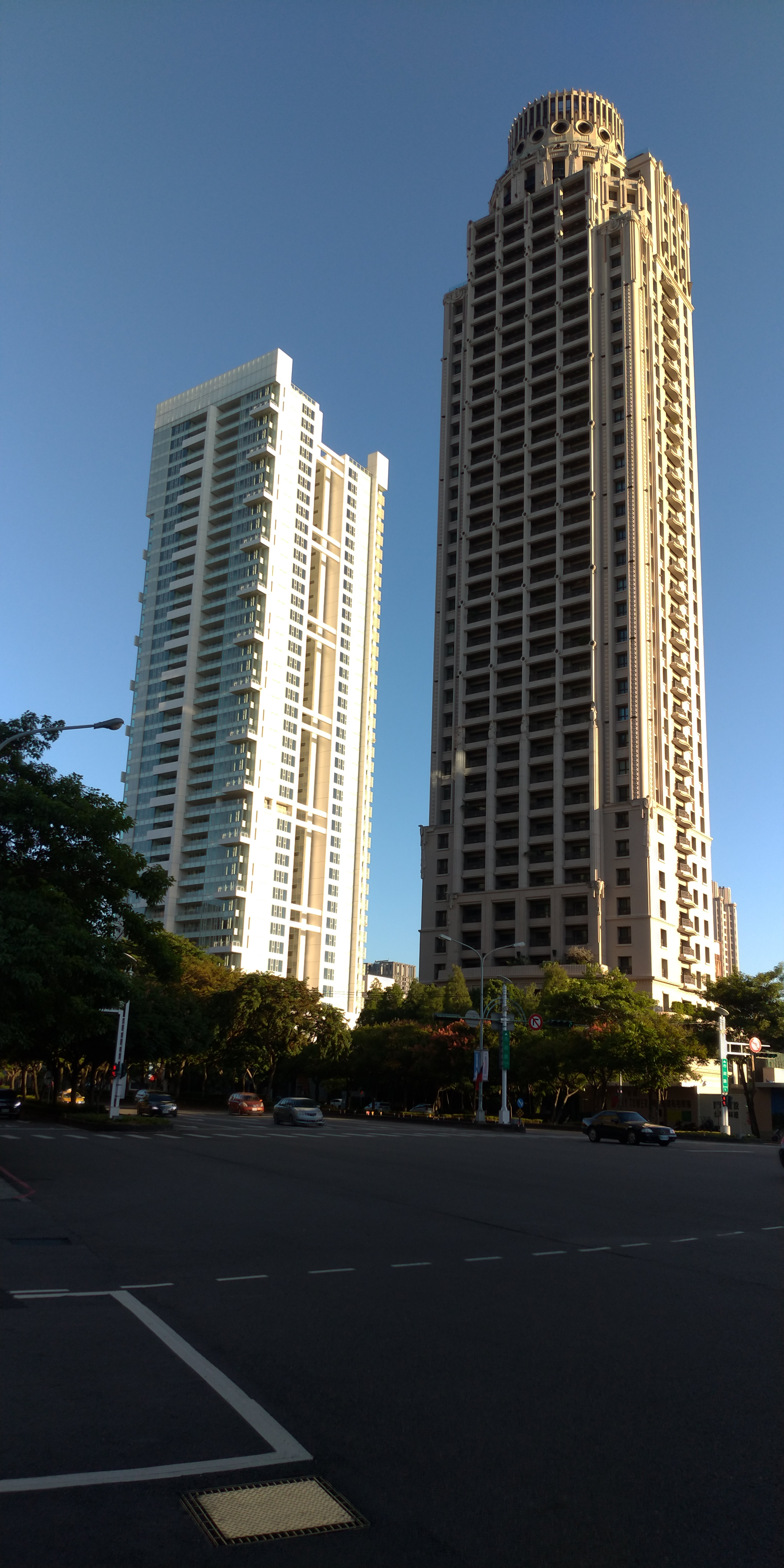
- Building on the right
- Interactive map of the Savoy Palace 聯聚保和大廈 area

General information
- Status: Completed
- Type: Residential
- Location: No. 25, Shizheng Road, Xitun District, Taichung, Taiwan
- Coordinates: 24.155641293523455°N 120.64434465208588°E
- Construction started: 2013
- Completed: 2017

Height
- Architectural: 157 m (515 ft)

Technical details
- Floor count: 39

The Savoy Palace (Chinese: 聯聚保和大廈; pinyin: Lián jù bǎo hé dàshà) is a residential skyscraper located in Taichung's 7th Redevelopment Zone, Xitun District, Taichung, Taiwan. Construction of the building began in 2013 and it was completed in 2017. The height of the building is 157 m (515 ft), and it comprises 39 floors above ground, as well as six basement levels. As of January 2021, it is the 18th tallest building in Taichung and 47th tallest in Taiwan.

== Design ==
The exterior design of the building adopts the neo-classical style, with circular columns and stone steps that rise up to the porch of the ground floor, which displays ancient European criss-cross coat of arms. A revolving door leads into the 9.5 m (31 ft)-tall grand hall, where three Italian crystal chandeliers are hung from the ceiling and decorated with paintings of 17th-century townhouses. The backyard is equipped with a large vertical planted wall with an outdoor swimming pool. Facilities on the second floor include gyms, yoga rooms and a theatre; the third floor is designed with Chinese and Western style banquet halls. The Sky Lounge located on the top floor of the building is equipped with sofas, where one can view the night cityscape of Taichung. The basement houses an exhibition hall exhibiting a 1933 Rolls-Royce antique car.

== See also ==
- List of tallest buildings in Taiwan
- List of tallest buildings in Taichung
- Taichung's 7th Redevelopment Zone
- Fountain Palace
- Plato Palace
