= Shuikutou =

Area in Xitun, Taichung, Taiwan

Coordinates: 24.187480°N 120.627159°E

Shuikutou (Chinese: 水堀頭; pinyin: shuǐkūtóu) is a historical name for an area located in Xitun District, Taichung, Taiwan. It is located in the west of the district, and roughly encompasses Yongan, Fu'an, Fulin, Fulian, Fuya, Furei, Fuhe, Fuzhong, Fu'en villages.

== History ==
The name means "at the head of the watering hole". This area is where multiple streams flowing down the Dadu Plateau would merge with the Fazi River, a tributary of the Dadu River. Due to the abundance of water, this was one of the first areas settled in Taichung.

In 1903, during the Japanese Rule of Taiwan, Shuikutou was administered as Shuikutou-jo, Nishidaidun-ku, Taichu Prefecture (台中廳西大墩區水堀頭庄). Then, under the "Dōka policy" to make Taiwan equal but separate to Japan, the political divisions became more similar to mainland Japan. Shuikutou was merged with neighboring villages into Saiton-jo, Daiton-gun, Taichu Prefecture (台中廳大屯郡西屯庄). After World War II, Shuikutou, along with the rest of Saiton-jo, formed Xitun County, which was then renamed Xitun District.
