= Robert Huang =

Robert Huang may refer to:

- Robert T. Huang, founder of SYNNEX Corporation
- Blaber (gamer) (born 2000), professional League of Legends player
- Huang Teng-hui (born 1959), Taiwanese artist and entrepreneur
