= Ben Wang (materials scientist) =

American materials scientist

- 王緒斌
- Education: Tunghai University (BS); Pennsylvania State University (MS, PhD)
- Scientific career
- Workplaces: Florida State University; Georgia Institute of Technology

Ben Wang (Chinese: 王緒斌; pinyin: wáng xù bīn; Zhuyin Fuhao: ㄨㄤˊ ㄒㄩˋ ㄅㄧㄣ; born 1954) is an American materials scientist who specializes in materials engineering, applying emerging technologies to improve the manufacturing of affordable composite materials. He is a professor at the Georgia Institute of Technology's H. Milton Stewart School of Industrial and Systems Engineering, holds the Eugene C. Gwaltney, Jr. Chair in Manufacturing, and is the Executive Director of the Georgia Tech Manufacturing Institute.

== Education ==
Wang earned a bachelor's degree in industrial engineering from Tunghai University in Taiwan, and later master's and Ph.D. degrees, also in industrial engineering, from Pennsylvania State University.

== Career ==
He was a Professor of Engineering, Director of the High-Performance Materials Institute, and served as Assistant Vice-President for Research in Engineering at Florida State University. In 1998, Wang founded the Florida Advanced Center for Composite Technologies.

He is a professor at the Georgia Institute of Technology's H. Milton Stewart School of Industrial and Systems Engineering, holds the Eugene C. Gwaltney, Jr. Chair in Manufacturing, and is the Executive Director of the Georgia Tech Manufacturing Institute.

== Awards and memberships ==
Wang is Fellow of the Institute of Industrial Engineers, the Society of Manufacturing Engineers, and the Society for the Advancement of Material and Process Engineering.

== Selected publications ==
Wang has co-authored three books: Computer-Aided Manufacturing (1991), Computer-Aided Process Planning (1991), and Computer Aided Manufacturing PC Application Software.
