= Plato Palace =

Residential skyscraper in Xitun, Taichung, Taiwan

Plato Palace 聯聚瑞和大廈
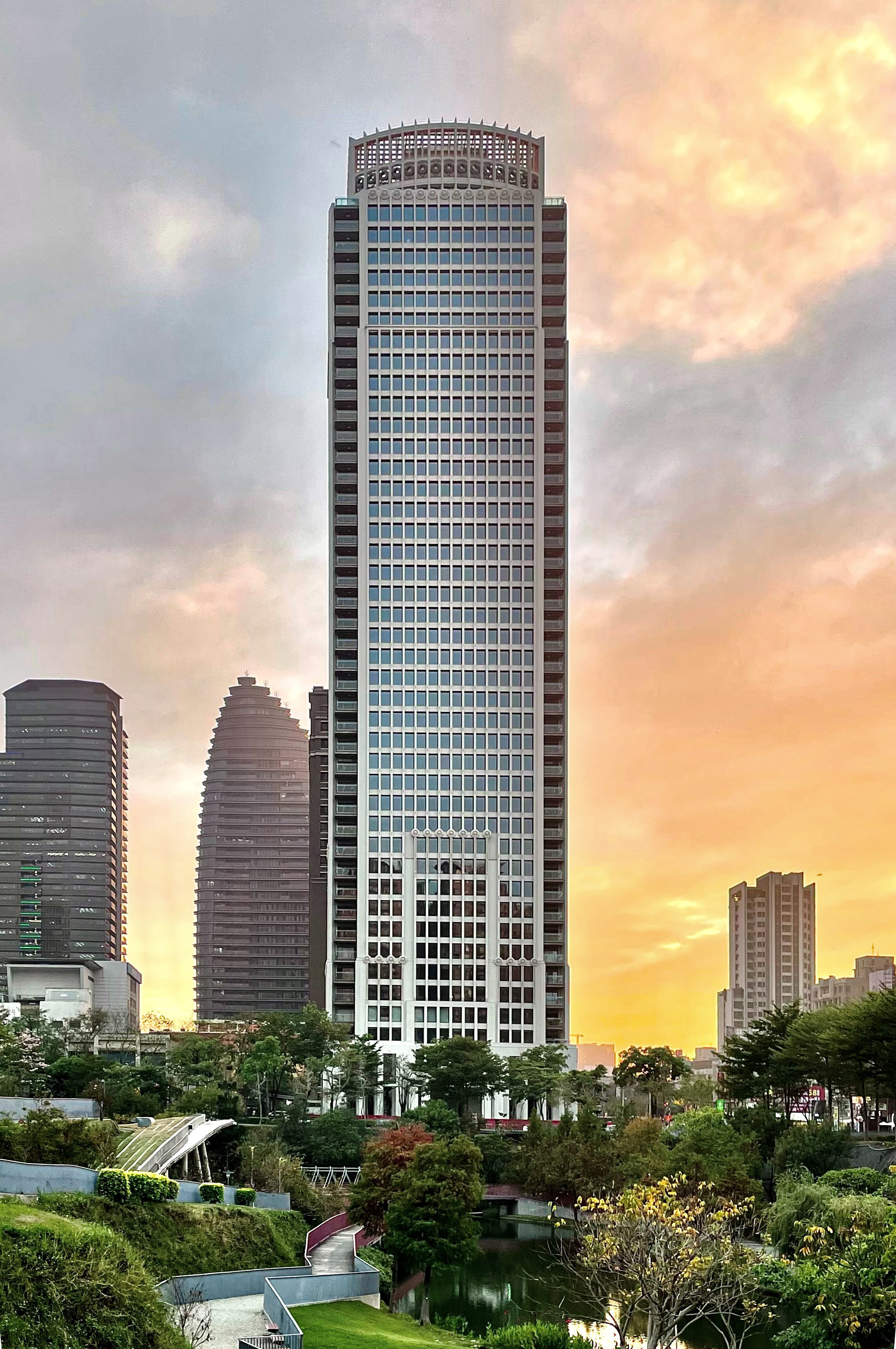
- Interactive map of the Plato Palace 聯聚瑞和大廈 area

General information
- Status: Completed
- Type: Residential
- Location: No. 175, Shizheng North 1st Road, Xitun District, Taichung, Taiwan
- Coordinates: 24.166878566556868°N 120.63802736928308°E
- Construction started: 2017
- Completed: 2021

Height
- Architectural: 172.8 m (567 ft)

Technical details
- Floor count: 43
- Floor area: 46,585 m^{2} (501,440 sq ft)

The Plato Palace (Chinese: 聯聚瑞和大廈; pinyin: Lián jù ruè hé dàshà) is a residential skyscraper located in Taichung's 7th Redevelopment Zone, Xitun District, Taichung, Taiwan. Construction of the tower began in 2017 and it was topped out in 2020. The height of the building is 172.8 m (567 ft), with a floor area of 46,585 m^{2} (501,440 sq ft), and it comprises 43 floors above ground, as well as six basement levels. As of January 2021, it is the tallest residential building in Taichung, 4th tallest building in Taichung and 20th tallest building in Taiwan. The building was constructed under strict requirements of preventing earthquakes and typhoons common in Taiwan.

== See also ==
- List of tallest buildings in Taiwan
- List of tallest buildings in Taichung
- Taichung's 7th Redevelopment Zone
- Savoy Palace (skyscraper)
- Fountain Palace
