= Fountain Palace =

Residential skyscraper in Xitun, Taichung, Taiwan

Fountain Palace 聯聚方庭大廈
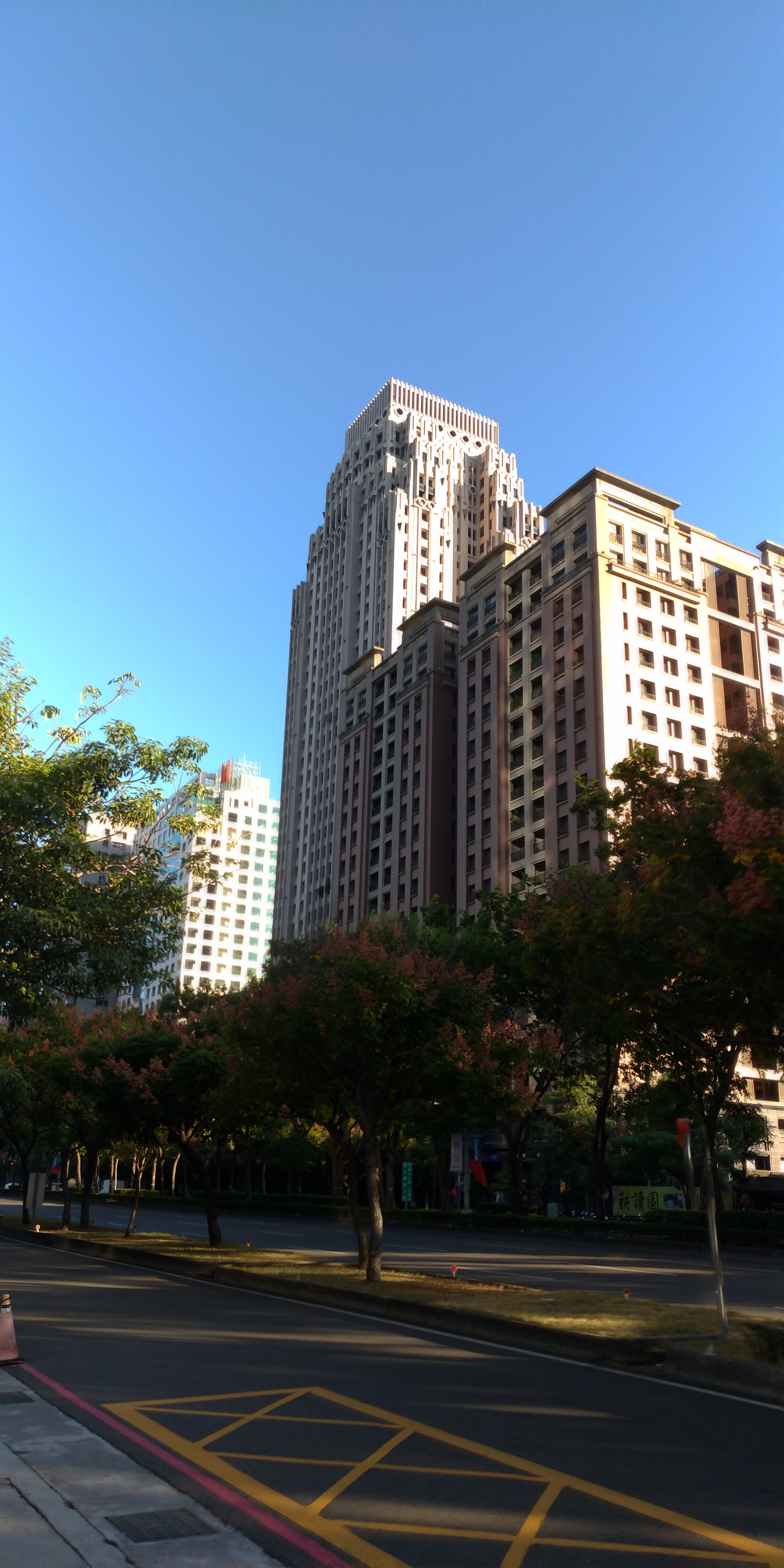
- Interactive map of the Fountain Palace 聯聚方庭大廈 area

General information
- Status: Completed
- Type: Residential
- Location: Xitun District, Taichung, Taiwan
- Coordinates: 24°09′38″N 120°38′42″E
- Construction started: 2008
- Completed: 2010

Height
- Architectural: 155 m (509 ft)

Technical details
- Floor count: 39

Design and construction
- Architect: C.Y. Lee & Partners

The Fountain Palace (Chinese: 聯聚方庭大廈; pinyin: Liánjù Fāngtíng Dàshà) is a residential skyscraper located in Xitun District, Taichung, Taiwan. It was completed in 2010 and was designed by C.Y. Lee & Partners. The height of the building is 155 m (509 ft), and it comprises 39 floors above ground, as well as five basement levels.

== See also ==
- List of tallest buildings in Taiwan
- List of tallest buildings in Taichung
- Taichung's 7th Redevelopment Zone
- Savoy Palace (skyscraper)
- Plato Palace
