= Pei-yuan Chia =

American banker

- Born: 1939 (age 86–87); Hong Kong
- Education: Tunghai University (BA); University of Pennsylvania (MBA)
- Occupation: Banker
- Employer: Citicorp
- Spouses: Frances Chia (m. 1965; died 2003); Kitty Shen (m. 2005)
- Children: 3

Chinese name
- Traditional Chinese: 賈培源
- Hanyu Pinyin: Jiǎ Péiyuán
- Wade–Giles: Chia^{3} Pei^{2}-yuan^{2}

Pei-yuan Chia (賈培源; born 1939) is an American banker. He worked for Citicorp from 1974 until his retirement in 1996, and also held directorships in several other firms.

== Career ==
Chia worked at General Foods before joining Citicorp in 1974. From then until 1992, he held various senior management positions in Citicorp and Citibank, N.A. and was Citibank, N.A.'s senior customer contact for corporate banking activities in Asia. He was promoted to head of the global consumer business in 1992, following a four-year period in which he grew Citicorp's foreign consumer banking operations by 25% annually to $300 million per year in profit. He served as a director of Citicorp and Citibank, N.A., beginning in April 1993, and became vice chairman of Citicorp and Citibank, N.A., in January 1994. He took early retirement in 1996 at the urging of then-CEO John S. Reed. At the time of his retirement, he was the highest-ranking Asian American executive and corporate director in any major U.S. corporation.

== Personal life ==
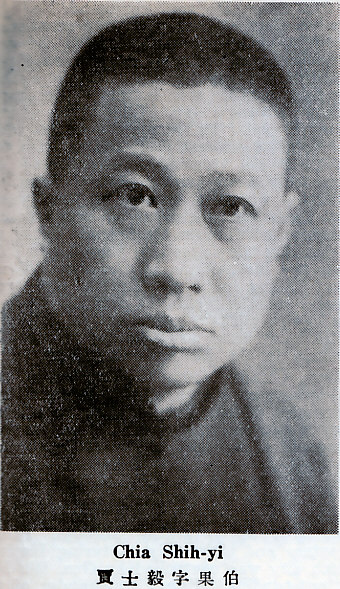
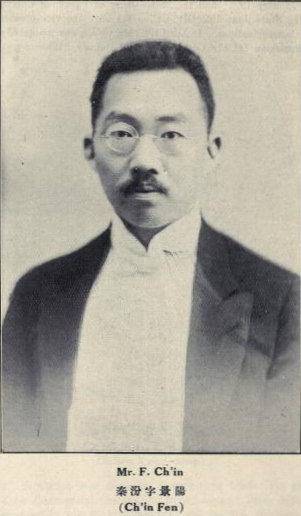
Chia's paternal grandfather Chia Shih-yi (left) and maternal grandfather Chin Fen (right)

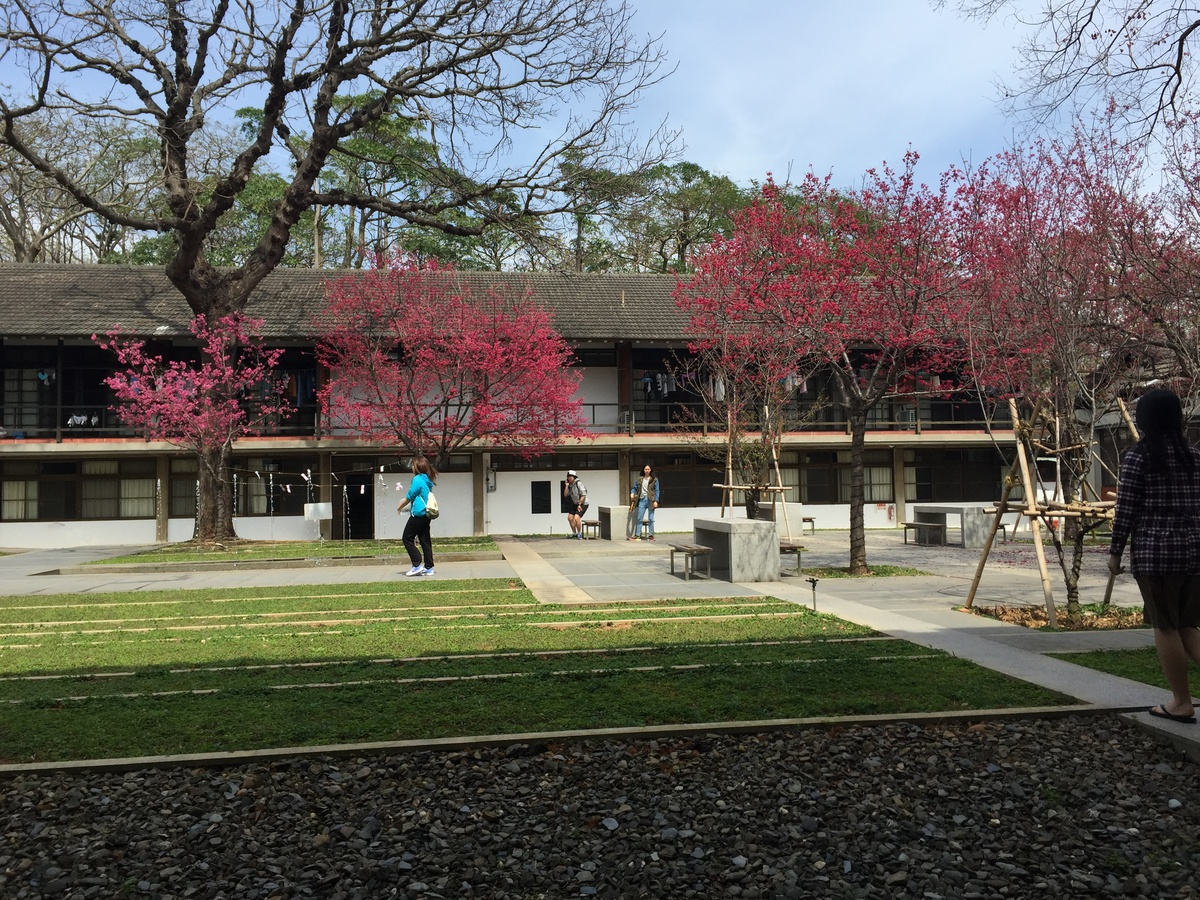
Chia donated Chuan Yuan (荃園) in memory of his wife, Frances T.C. Yen Chia (嚴雋荃), at Tunghai University.

Chia was born in Hong Kong. His father Dewey Teh-huai Chia (賈德懷; 1912–1998), the second son of Republic of China Ministry of Finance official Chia Shih-yi, was prominent in Shanghai's finance industry. His mother Kitty Shun-hua Chin Chia (秦舜華; 1916–2016), a daughter of educationalist Chin Fen, was a graduate of Yenching University. Chia's parents had moved to Hong Kong the year before his birth, and then the family moved again to Taiwan in 1951. His parents eventually settled in the United States in 1956, where his father started a maritime transport company and his mother worked as a statistician in the United Nations Secretariat. Chia himself remained in Taiwan for his education, attending Jianguo Middle School in Taipei and going on to graduate from Tunghai University in Taichung with a Bachelor of Arts degree in economics in 1961. He then joined his family in the U.S., where he earned an MBA from the Wharton School of the University of Pennsylvania in 1964. He was naturalized as a U.S. citizen in 1970.

Chia was married to Frances T.C. Yen Chia (嚴雋荃), a classmate of his at Tunghai University and a daughter of former President of the Republic of China Yen Chia-kan, from 1965 until her death in 2003. He had three children with her: Douglas, a lawyer; Katherine, an architect; and Candice. He remarried in 2005 to his high school sweetheart Katherine "Kitty" Shen (沈君玉).

To commemorate Frances' life, Chia endowed a garden in front of the women's dormitory at Tunghai University, which opened in November 2006. He also established an endowed professorship in marketing, the Frances and Pei-Yuan Chia Professorship, at the University of Pennsylvania; it has been held by Peter Fader since 2003. He was awarded an honorary doctorate by Tunghai University in 2007.

== Other activities ==
Chia served on the Wharton Graduate Executive Board of the University of Pennsylvania. In addition, he is a Senior Fellow of the SEI Center for Advanced Studies in Management at the Wharton Business School. As chairman of the Chia Family Foundation, he conducts philanthropic activities benefiting various educational and medical causes, including the Hoag Hospital Foundation. In June 2022, Hoag named a hospital building in Irvine, California, for Chia and his wife Shen in recognition of their philanthropy.

Chia also serves or previously served as:

- Director of American International Group (until 2006)
- Trustee of the Asia Society
- Trustee of the Mt. Sinai-NYU Medical Centre
- Director of Aig Aviation
- Director of BOC Hong Kong Holdings Ltd. and its principal operating subsidiary Bank of China (Hong Kong) Ltd. (2001–2003)
- Director of Baxter International
- Director of Case Corporation (since 1997)
- Director of CNH Global
- Director of Singapore Airlines (since 2003)
- Senior advisor to Temasek Holdings
