= Tunghai University =

Private university in Taichung, Taiwan

- 東海大學
- Motto: 求眞, 篤信, 力行
- Motto in English: Truth, Faith, Deeds
- Type: Private
- Established: 1955; 71 years ago
- Religious affiliation: Christian
- President: Kuo-En Chang
- Undergraduates: 12,917
- Postgraduates: 2,216
- Location: Xitun, Taichung, Taiwan; 24°10′41″N 120°36′13″E
- Campus: Suburban, 1.35 km^{2} (0.52 sq mi)
- Website: www.thu.edu.tw
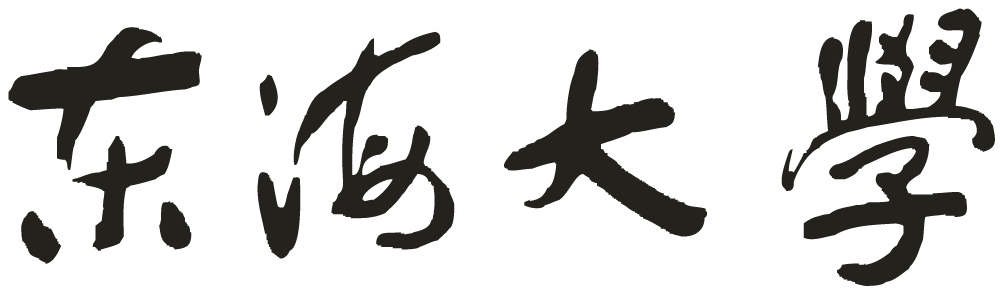

Chinese name
- Traditional Chinese: 東海大學
- Simplified Chinese: 东海大学
Transcriptions
Standard Mandarin
- Hanyu Pinyin: Dōnghǎi Dàxué
- Wade–Giles: Tung¹-hai³ Ta⁴-hsüeh²

Tunghai University (THU; Chinese: 東海大學; pinyin: Dōnghǎi Dàxué; lit. 'East Sea University') is a private Christian research university in Xitun District, Taichung, Taiwan. It was established in 1955 by the United Board for Christian Higher Education in Asia as the successor to the Christian colleges that were closed in mainland China following the Chinese Civil War.

The university is organized into nine academic colleges, which collectively consist of 34 academic departments which host undergraduate, graduate, and doctoral programs. It is known for its emphasis on a liberal arts education. Its 329-acre (134 ha) campus is located near the foothills of Dadu Mountain and is designated as a cultural heritage site by the Bureau of Cultural Heritage. It is the largest private university campus in the country by land area, and houses landmarks such as the Luce Memorial Chapel, designed by I. M. Pei.

== History ==
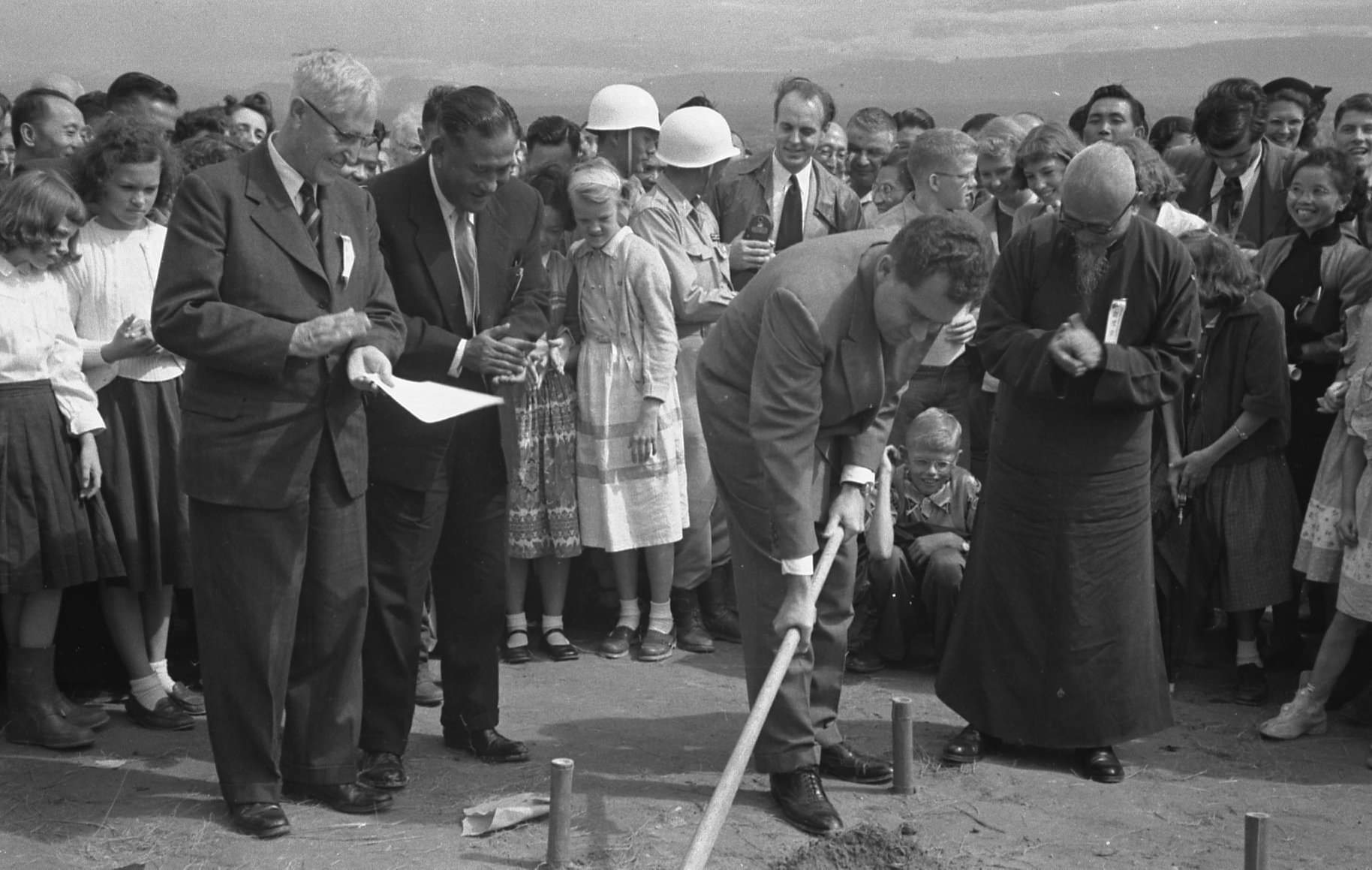
U.S. Vice President Richard Nixon at the ground-breaking ceremony in 1955

After the Chinese Civil War (1929–1949) and the closing of Christian higher education institutions by the Chinese Communist Party (CCP), Christian officials in the Nationalist government appealed to the United Board for Christian Higher Education in Asia to establish a new Christian institution of higher education in Taiwan. The board affirmed in 1953 that "a Christian university should be a permanent element in Taiwan," and the Taichung City Government subsequently donated 345 acres for the founding of Tunghai University, which was conceived as the successor to the twelve Christian universities that had operated in mainland China before 1949. The planning for the university's campus, layout, and architecture began in 1953 and was overseen by prominent architects I. M. Pei, Chen Chi-kwan, and Chang Chao-Kang, with Pei as the chief architect.

The university was formally established in 1955 by Methodist missionaries and was located on the Dadu Plateau of Taichung. The university's name, Tunghai (pinyin: Dōnghǎi; Wade–Giles: Tung¹-hai³; lit. 'East Sea'), referred to its position east of the Taiwan Strait. Time magazine described it as "the first Christian university in Formosa's history." It was also the first private university founded in the country. U.S. vice president Richard Nixon participated in the ground-breaking ceremony on November 11, 1953. I. M. Pei designed the university's original three terraced quadrangles and four student dormitories. Beauson Tseng, a professor of English literature at National Taiwan University, became its first president.

Tunghai originally housed 35 faculty members, comprising mainland Chinese, Taiwanese, and American scholars. Its first class of students were selected in the summer of 1954 from a pool of 5,800 applicants. The student body was predominantly mainland Chinese and had a male-to-female ratio of 3:1. By 1995, the university had 12,971 students and a student-to-professor ratio of 18:1.

== Academics ==
Tunghai has nine academic colleges: the College of Science, the College of Arts, the College of Management, the College of Social Sciences, the College of Engineering, the College of Agriculture, the College of Law, the College of Fine Arts and Creative Design, and the International College. The colleges are subdivided into 36 total academic departments. As of 2022, the university has 36 undergraduate degree programs, 35 master's degree programs, 15 doctoral degree programs, and 16 dual degree programs.

=== College of Arts ===
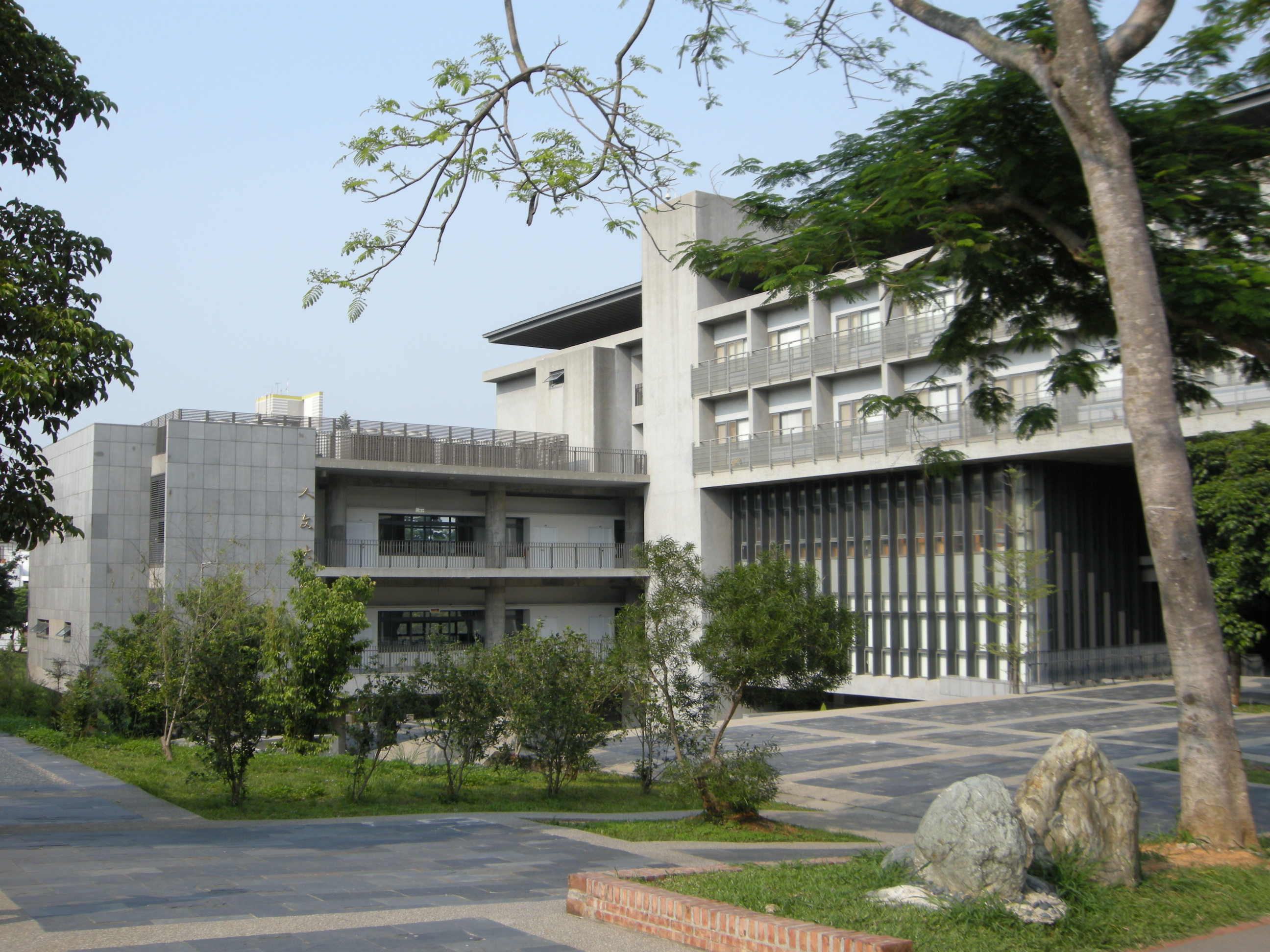
Humanities Building

- Department of Chinese Literature
- Department of Foreign Languages and Literature
- Department of History
- Department of Japanese Language and Culture
- Department of Philosophy
- International Graduate Program of Teaching Chinese as a Second Language
- English Language Center

=== College of Science ===
- Department of Life Science
- Department of Chemistry
- Department of Mathematics
- Department of Physics
- International Ph. D. Program in Biomedical & Materials Science
- International Graduate Degree Program for Biodiversity

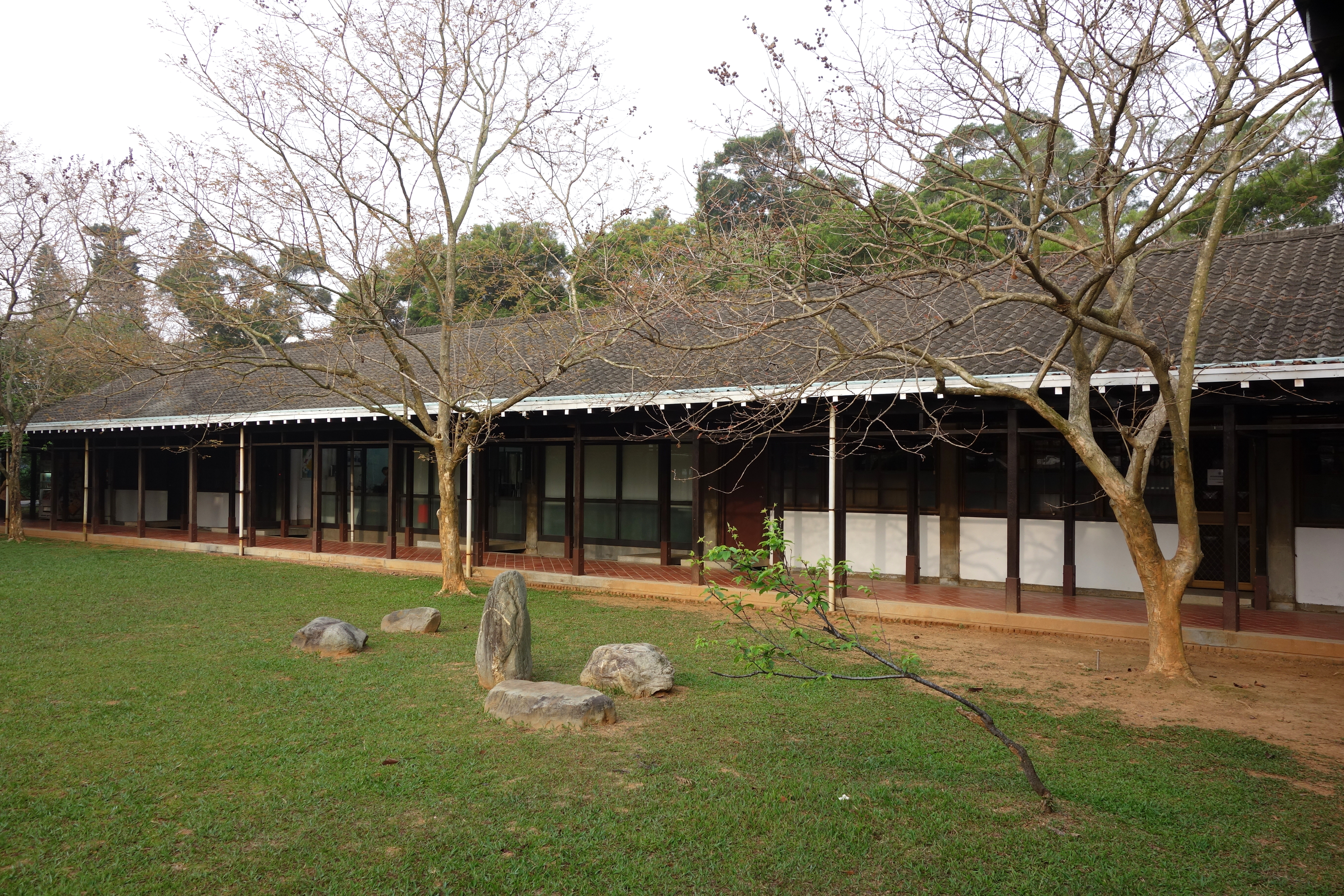
College of Engineering

=== College of Engineering ===
- Department of Chemical and Materials Engineering
- Department of Computer Science
- Department of Environmental Science
- Department of Industrial Engineering
- Department of Electrical Engineering

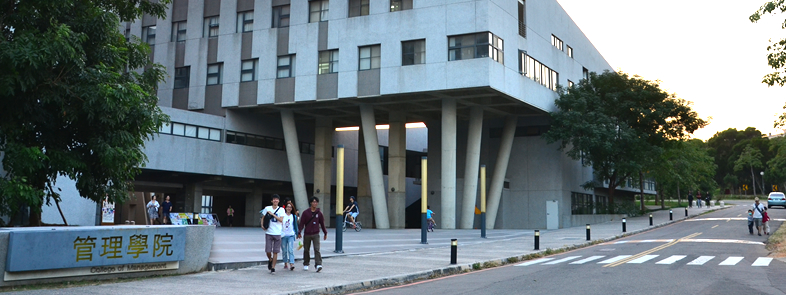
Tunghai College of Management

=== College of Management ===
- Department of Accounting
- Department of Business Administration
- Department of Finance
- Department of Information Management
- Department of International Business
- Department of Statistics
- Executive Master of Business Administration (EMBA)
- Global Master of Business Administration (Global MBA)

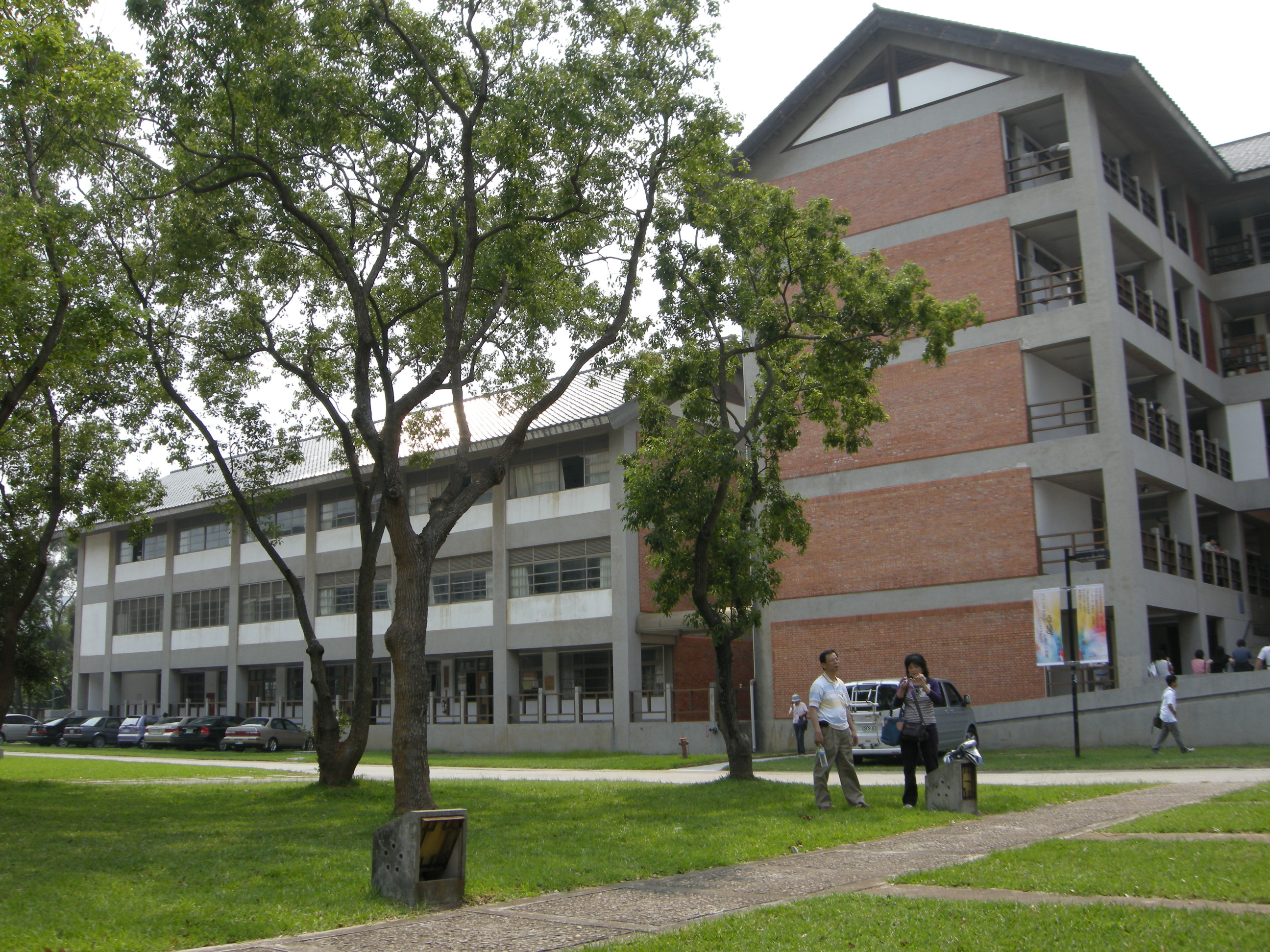
College of Social Science

=== College of Social Science ===
- Department of Economics
- Department of Political Science
- Department of Public Management and Policy
- Department of Social Work
- Department of Sociology

=== College of Agriculture and Health ===
- Department of Animal Science
- Department of Food Science
- Department of Hospitality Management
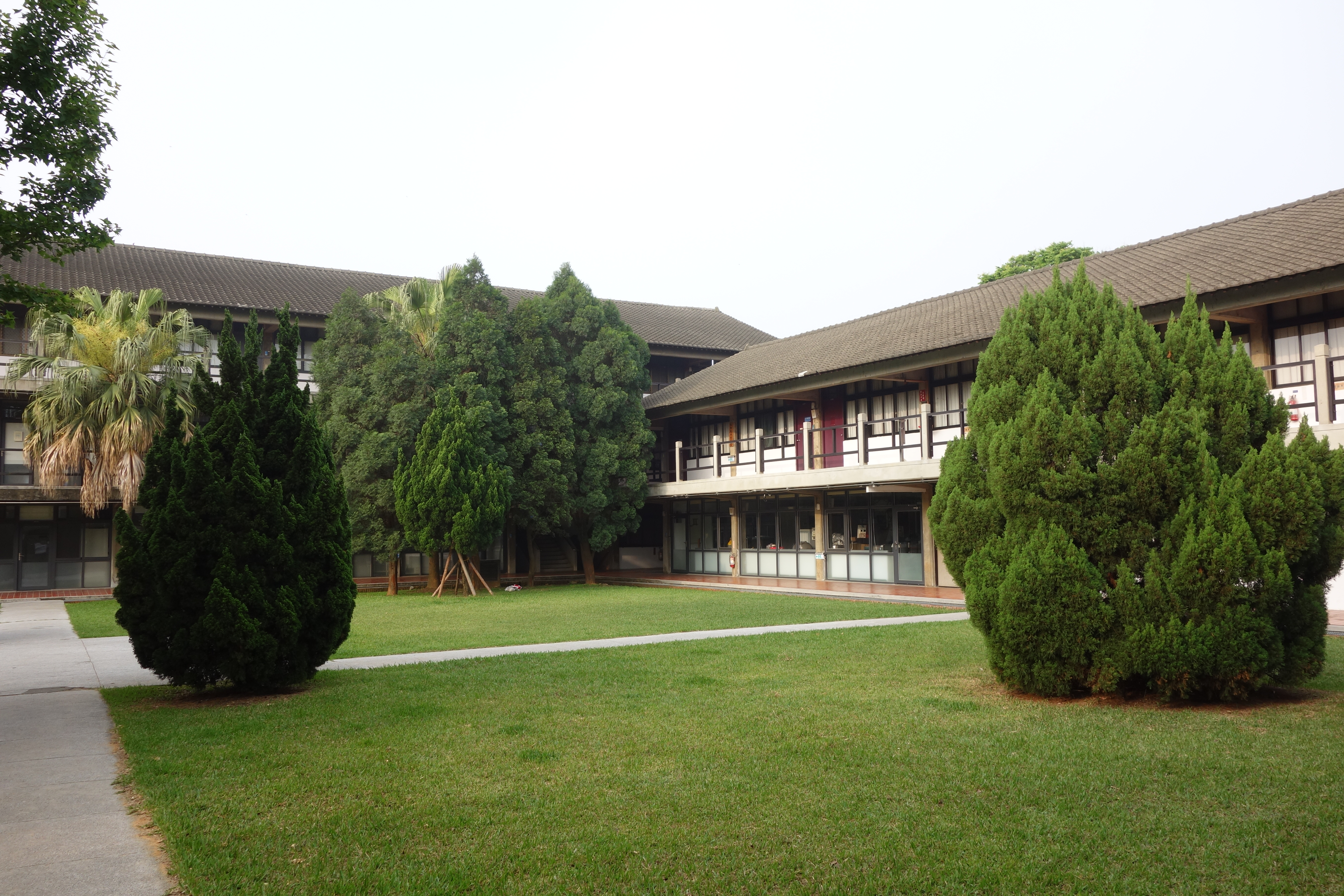
  College of Agriculture and Health

=== College of Fine Arts and Creative Design ===
- Department of Fine Arts
- Department of Music
- Department of Architecture
- Department of Industrial Design
- Department of Landscape Architecture

=== College of Law ===
- Department of Law

=== International College ===
In 2014, the university established its English-taught International College, offering three bachelor's degree programs: international business administration (IBA), sustainability science and engineering (SSE), and an interdisciplinary program.

In 2020, the International College began accepting international students who would like to learn Chinese without declaring a major in the first two years. In their junior and senior year, students can declare a major in either programs within the International College or other colleges at Tunghai University.

=== Center for General Education ===
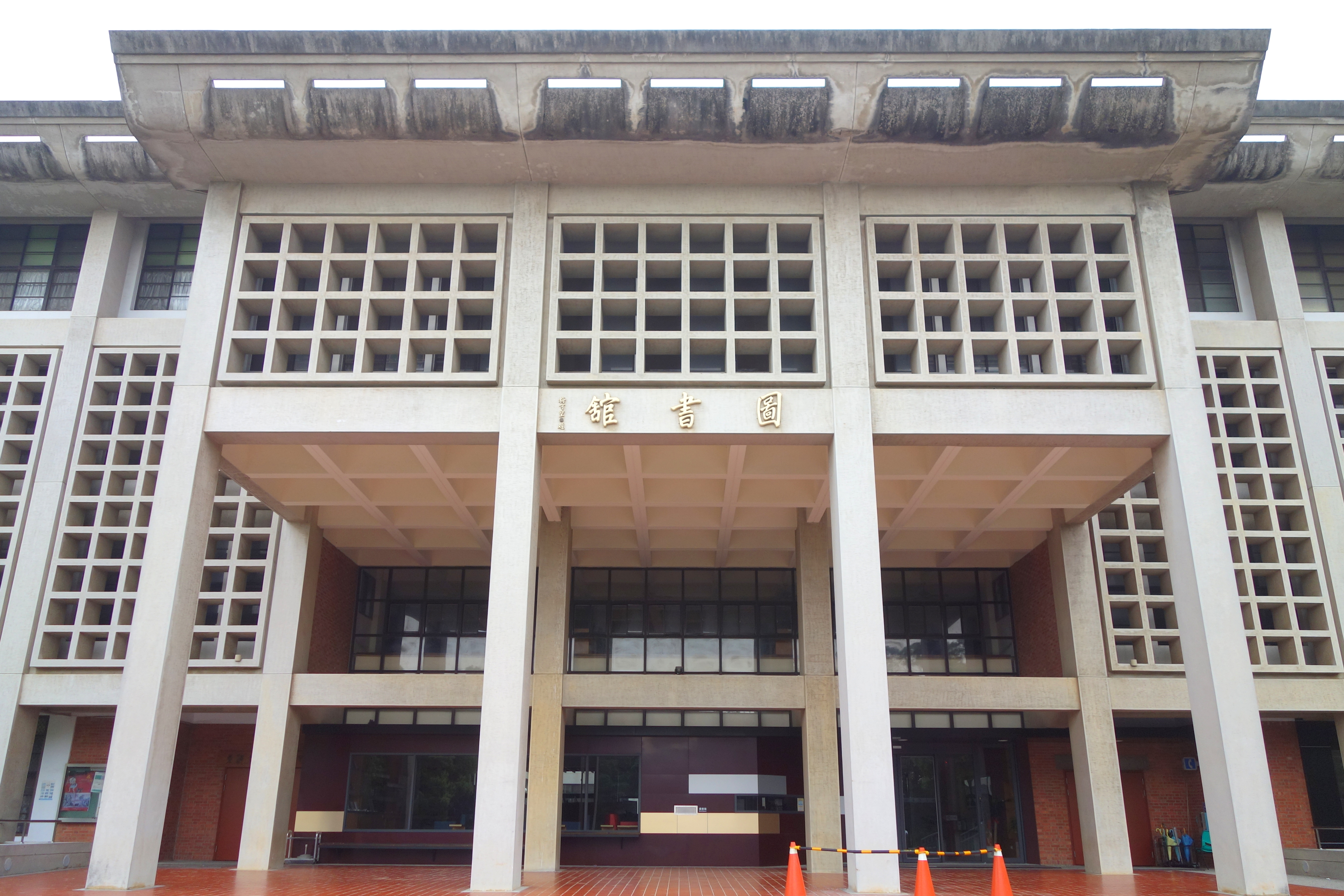
Tunghai University Library

The university puts emphasis on liberal education. The center offers courses in the fields of natural sciences, humanities, social sciences, and Western classics.

=== Library ===
The Tunghai University Main Library is located at the end of the Campus Mall. Library holdings include, approximately, 600,000 volumes, 6,515 current serials, 21,523 electronic serials, nonprint formats, and rare books.

== Ranking ==
Tunghai University rankings

Global – Overall
- CWUR World: 1811 (2023)
- QS World: 1201-1400 (2024)
- THE World: 1201-1500 (2023)

Regional – Overall
- QS Asia: =261 (2025)
- THE Asia: 501+ (2022)
- THE Emerging Economies: 501+ (2022)

National – Overall
- CWUR National: 30 (2023)
- QS National: 25 (2024)
- THE National: 27 (2023)

=== Ecological and social responsibility ===
Tunghai University is ranked in third place among all the universities in Taiwan, and first among private universities, in Times Higher Education's University Impact Rankings, 2020, which assesses universities against the United Nations’ 17 Sustainable Development Goals (SDGs).

In the 2020 Taiwan Corporate Sustainability Award (TCSA), Tunghai University scored high in the categories of Sustainability Model University.

Tunghai also won USR's Best Sustainability Project Awards. Tunghai University and National Taiwan University both won Golden class honors.

== External Affiliations ==
The university is member of the following international organizations and consortia:

- Association of Christian Universities and Colleges in Asia
- Alliance of Asian Liberal Arts Universities
- Council for Christian Colleges and Universities

== Campus life and traditions ==
=== The Luce Memorial Chapel ===
The Luce Chapel is a Christian chapel at Tunghai University in Taichung, Taiwan. Henry R. Luce, the founder of Time Magazine and Life Magazine, funded its construction to commemorate his father, Henry W. Luce. It is the work of Taiwanese architect Chen Chi-Kwan and Chinese-American architect I. M. Pei. It is a landmark of Tunghai University and Taichung City. On April 25, 2019, it was declared a national monument by the Ministry of Culture.

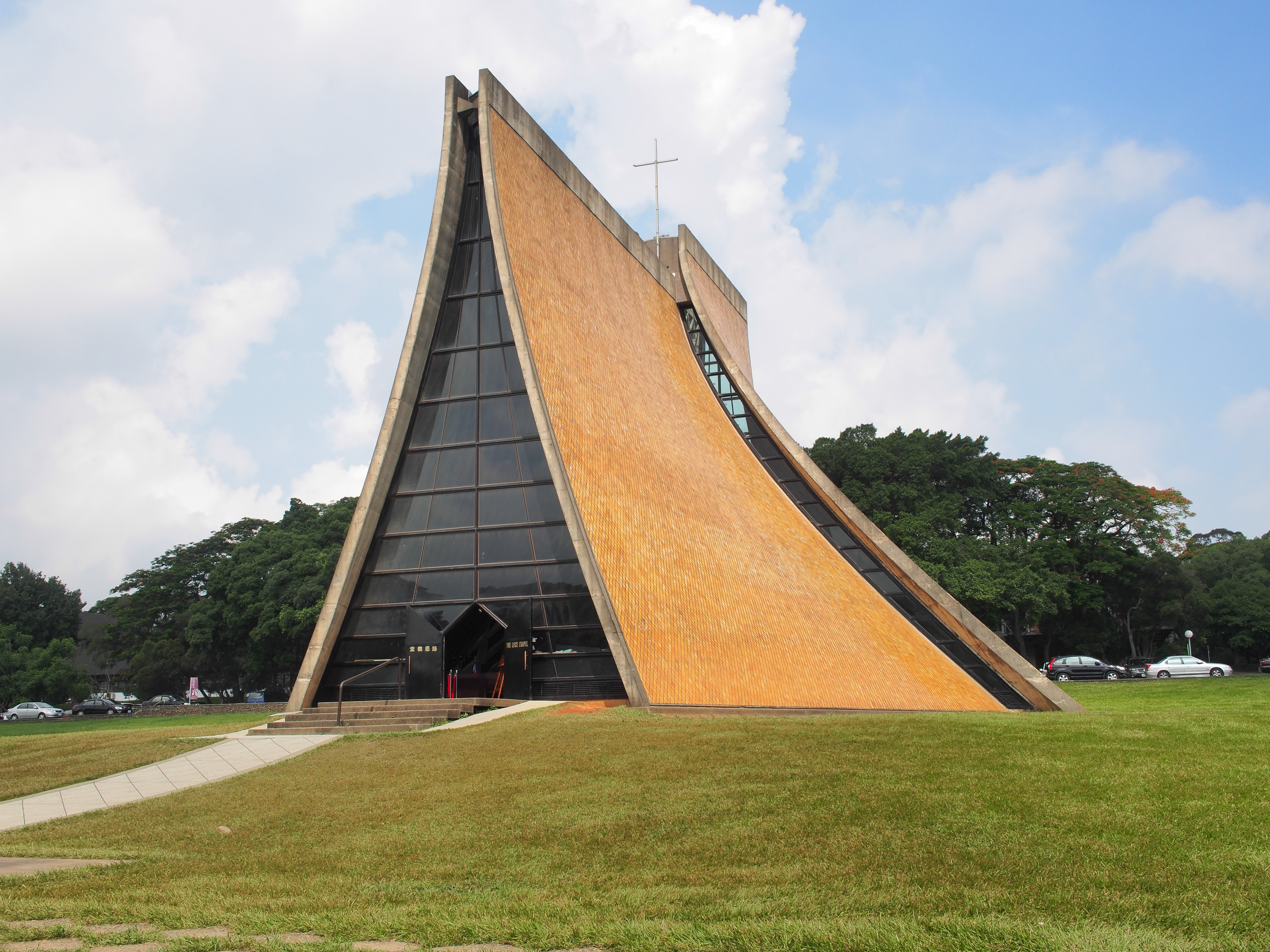
Luce Memorial Chapel

=== Priest Bell Tower ===
Built in 1966, the Priest Bell Tower is located in front of the entrance of the Luce Memorial Chapel in Tunghai University. In 2017, the Taichung City Cultural Assets Office registered it as a municipal monument. The Bell Tower is named in honor of Elsie Priest, who was invited to Taiwan by the United Board for Christian Higher Education in Asia (UBCHEA) in early 1955 to assist Tunghai University as the chief accounting officer and general secretary. Priest made many contributions to the university in its early years.

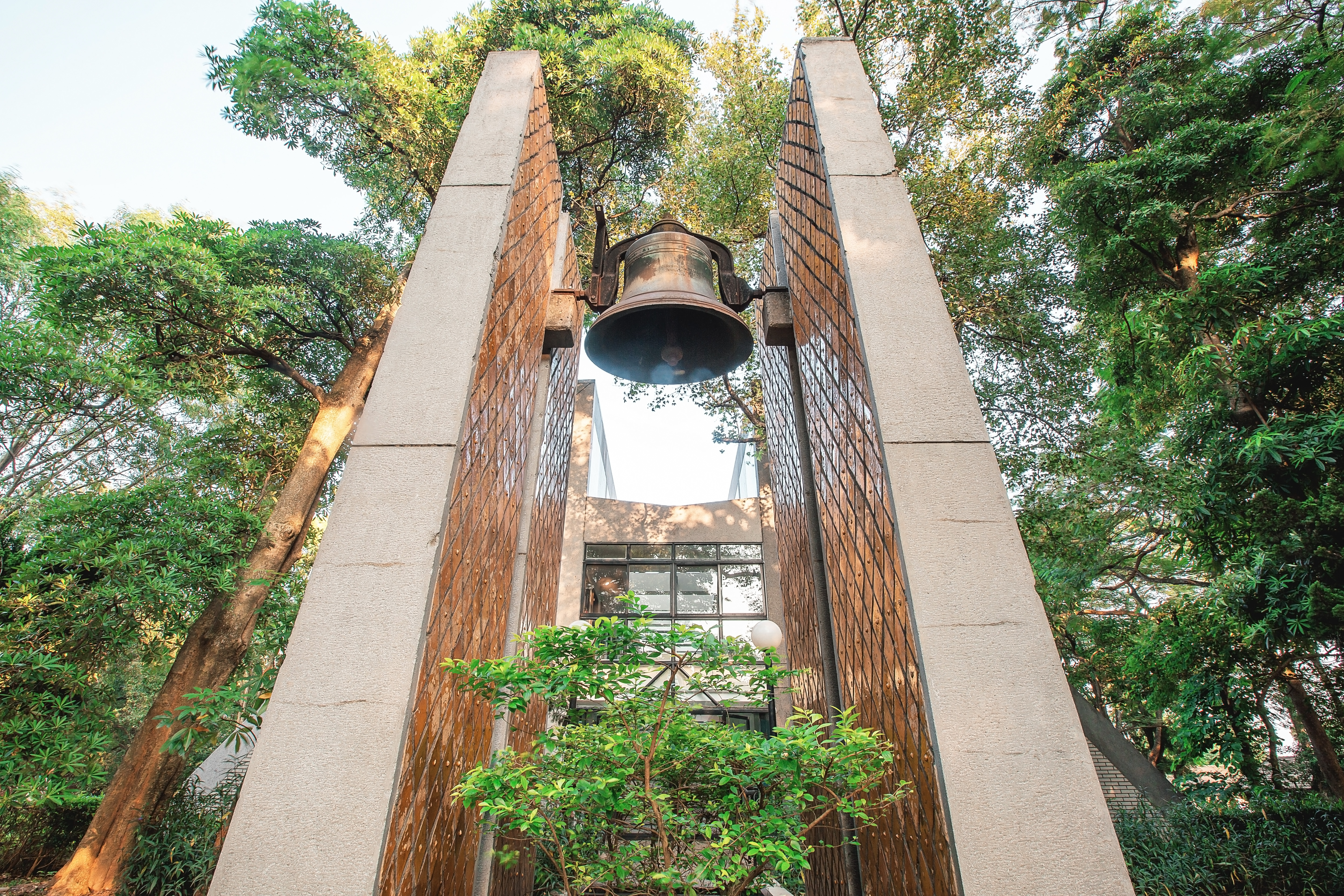
Priest Bell Tower

=== Tunghai Experimental Farm ===
The farm is the largest farm for education and student internships in the country. Covering 50 hectares (120 acres), there are about 200 dairy cows on the farm, which produces Tunghai's dairy products, including milk and ice cream.

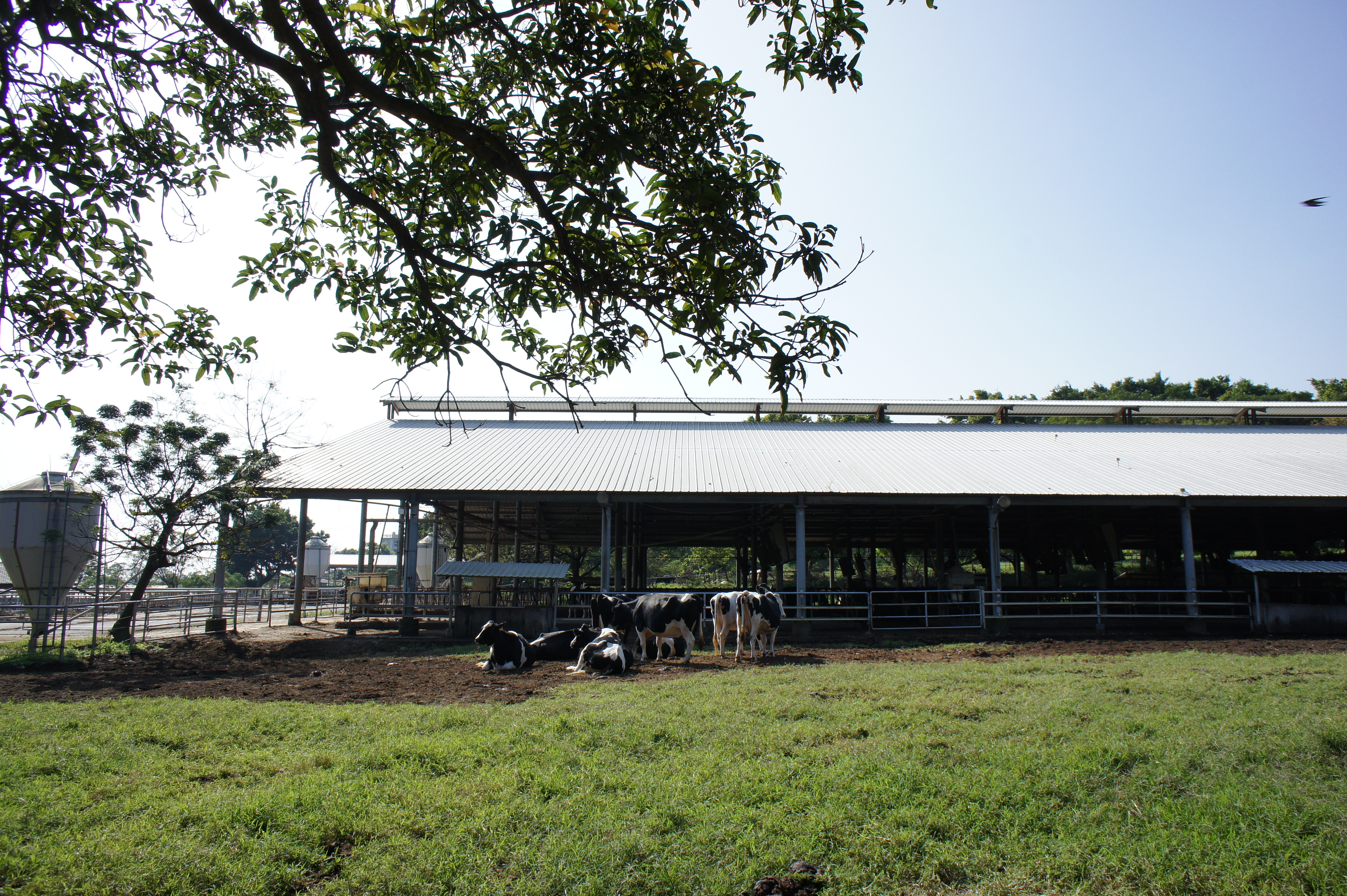
Tunghai Experimental Farm

=== Wenli Boulevard (Arts and Science Boulevard) ===
With the red bricks and gray tiles of colleges on both sides and the dense shade of the trees, Wenli Boulevard serves as the main line of movement between the colleges.

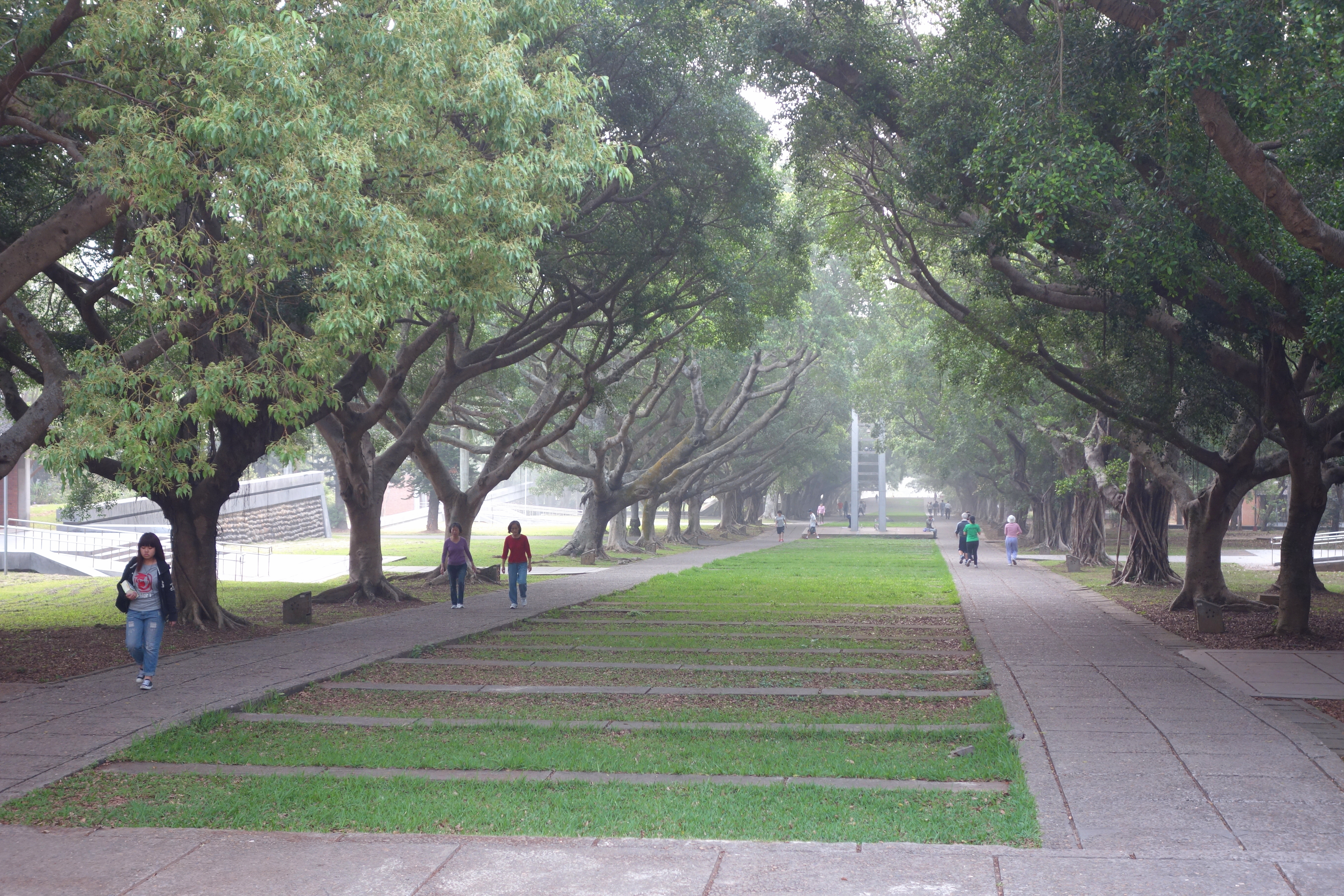
Wenli Boulevard

== List of presidents ==
- Beauson Tseng, 1953–1958
- Wu Teh Yao, 1958–1972
- Ming-Shan Hsieh, 1972–1978
- Mei Ko-wan, 1978–1992
- Ta-Nien Ruan, 1992–1995
- Kang-Pei Wang, 1995–2004
- Haydn Chen, 2004–2012
- Ming-Jer Tang, 2013–2015
- Mao-Jiun Wang, 2016–present

== Notable alumni ==
Tunghai University alumni are well represented across various fields, including politics, where several have served as Premier of the Republic of China and President of the Legislative Yuan. The academic community also boasts numerous distinguished scholars. As of 2025, the university's alumni include one academician of the Chinese Academy of Sciences, one honorary fellow of the American Institute of Architects, two members of the U.S. National Academy of Engineering, two fellows of the American Academy of Arts and Sciences, and fourteen academicians of Academia Sinica, ranking third in Taiwan in terms of the number of Academia Sinica members.

- Giddens Ko, Blogger, Author and Film Director
- Chen Long-bin, sculptor
- Chiu Ching-chun, Magistrate of Hsinchu County (2009–2018)
- Chung Ling, writer, critic, educator and translator
- Pei-yuan Chia (1961), retired Citicorp executive
- Ho Min-hao, member of Legislative Yuan (2002–2008)
- Ho Ping, film director
- Huang Teng-hui, artist and entrepreneur
- Kolas Yotaka, spokesperson of Executive Yuan
- Che-Ming Ko, nuclear physicist
- Liau Huei-fang, Deputy Minister of Labor (2016-2017)
- Ping-hui Liao (1976), professor of Taiwan studies
- TC Lin (1988 exchange student), filmmaker, photographer, and writer
- Pan Shih-wei, Minister of Labor (2014)
- Tien Hung-mao, Minister of Foreign Affairs (2000–2002)
- Tsai Chi-chang, Vice President of Legislative Yuan
- Kevin Tsai (1985), television host on Kangxi Lai Le
- Tu Weiming (1961), ethicist and New Confucian, Harvard-Yenching Professor Emeritus of Chinese History and Philosophy, Harvard University
- Ben Wang, professor of materials engineering
- Yang Mu, poet
- Kris Yao (1975), architect
- Yu Shyi-kun (1985), Democratic Progressive Party politician
- Yang Yao, member of Legislative Yuan
- You Si-kun, Premier of the Republic of China and President of the Legislative Yuan
- Chou Huey-ying, member of the Legislative Yuan

== See also ==
- Education in the Republic of China
