= Chou Huey-ying =

Taiwanese politician

- 周慧瑛

Member of the Legislative Yuan
- In office 1 February 1999 – 31 January 2005
- Constituency: Taipei County 2

Member of the Taiwan Provincial Consultative Council
- In office 20 December 1989 – 31 January 1999

Personal details
- Born: 20 January 1955 (age 71) Taipei, Taiwan
- Party: Democratic Progressive Party
- Education: Tunghai University (BA)

Chou Huey-ying (Chinese: 周慧瑛; pinyin: Zhōu Huìyīng; born 20 January 1955) is a Taiwanese politician who served on the Taiwan Provincial Consultative Council from 1989 to 1999, when she took a seat on the Legislative Yuan, representing Taipei County, until 2002. She studied foreign languages at Tunghai University.
