= Kuo-En Chang =

Taiwanese academic administrator

Kuo-En Chang (Chinese: 張國恩; pinyin: Zhāng Guóēn, born 1958) is the president of Tunghai University and former president of National Taiwan Normal University.

== Life ==
Born in 1958, Chang grew up in a fishing village of Keelung, Taiwan. He graduated from the National Taiwan University of Science and Technology with a Bachelor of Science in electronics engineering in 1984 and earned his M.S. in electrical engineering in 1986 and his Ph.D. in electrical engineering in 1990, both from National Taiwan University.

After obtaining his doctorate, Chang joined NTNU, where he integrated computation with education and launched virtual learning, digital learning, and mobile learning. His endeavor in Elearning has also won him a patent in "The Software Structure for Interactive Learning on the Internet" (網際網路互動式教學軟體架構) in Taiwan.

At NTNU, Chang had been the director of Computer Center (Aug. 1990-July 1993), the director of the NTNU Library (Aug. 2004-July 2007), and the vice president (Aug. 2007-Feb. 2010). His excellence in academic research has won him numerous awards from the National Science Council (now the Ministry of Science and Technology) and the Ministry of Education. He has been the principal of NTNU since 22 February 2010.

== Education ==
- Ph.D., Electrical Engineering, National Taiwan University (1986 -1990)
- M.S.C., Electrical Engineering, National Taiwan University (1984 -1986)
- B.S.C., Electronic Engineering, National Taiwan University of Science and Technology (1982 -1984)

== Positions ==
- Professor, Grad. Institute of Information and Computer Education, NTNU (Aug. 1997–Present)
- President of NTNU (Feb. 2010 – Feb. 2018)
- Vice President of NTNU (Aug. 2007 - Feb. 2010)
- Director of the NTNU Library (Aug. 2004 - July 2007)
- Founder and Consultant, eLearning Quality Service Center (2005)
- Consultant of Digital Learning at The Industrial Technology Research Institute (ITRI) (2004)
- Assessment Committee, Program for Science and Technology for Learning in the Promotion of University Academic Excellence, National Central University (2003, 2004, 2005)
- Convener of the first subproject, National Science & Technology Program for ELearning (2003 - 2008)
- Development Committee of Information Education for Elementary and Junior High Students, Taichung City Government (Mar.2002 - Feb. 2005)
- Consultant, Computer Softwarebased Skill Test and Certification, Bureau of Employment and Vocational Training (Jan. 2002 - Dec. 2004)
- Director of Grad. Institute of Information and Computer Education, NTNU (Aug. 2000 - July 2002)
- Visiting Scholar at Bond University in Australia (Aug. 2000 - Jan. 2001)
- Preparatory Committee of Department of Information Education at National Taitung University (Aug. 1999 - July 2000)
- Director of Computer Center, NTNU (Aug. 1990 - July 1993)
- Associate Professor, Dept. of Information and Computer Education, NTNU (Feb. 1990 - July 1997)
- Lecturer, Dept. of Information and Computer Education, NTNU (Aug. 1987 - Jan. 1990)
- Lecturer, Dept. of Electronic Engineering, HsinPu Private Junior College of Industry (St. John’s University) (Aug. 1986 - July 1987)
- Reviewing Committee, Department of Science Education at National Science Council (1999–Present)
