= Huang Teng-hui =

Taiwanese artist and businessman (born 1959)

Teng-Hui Huang (Robert Huang)
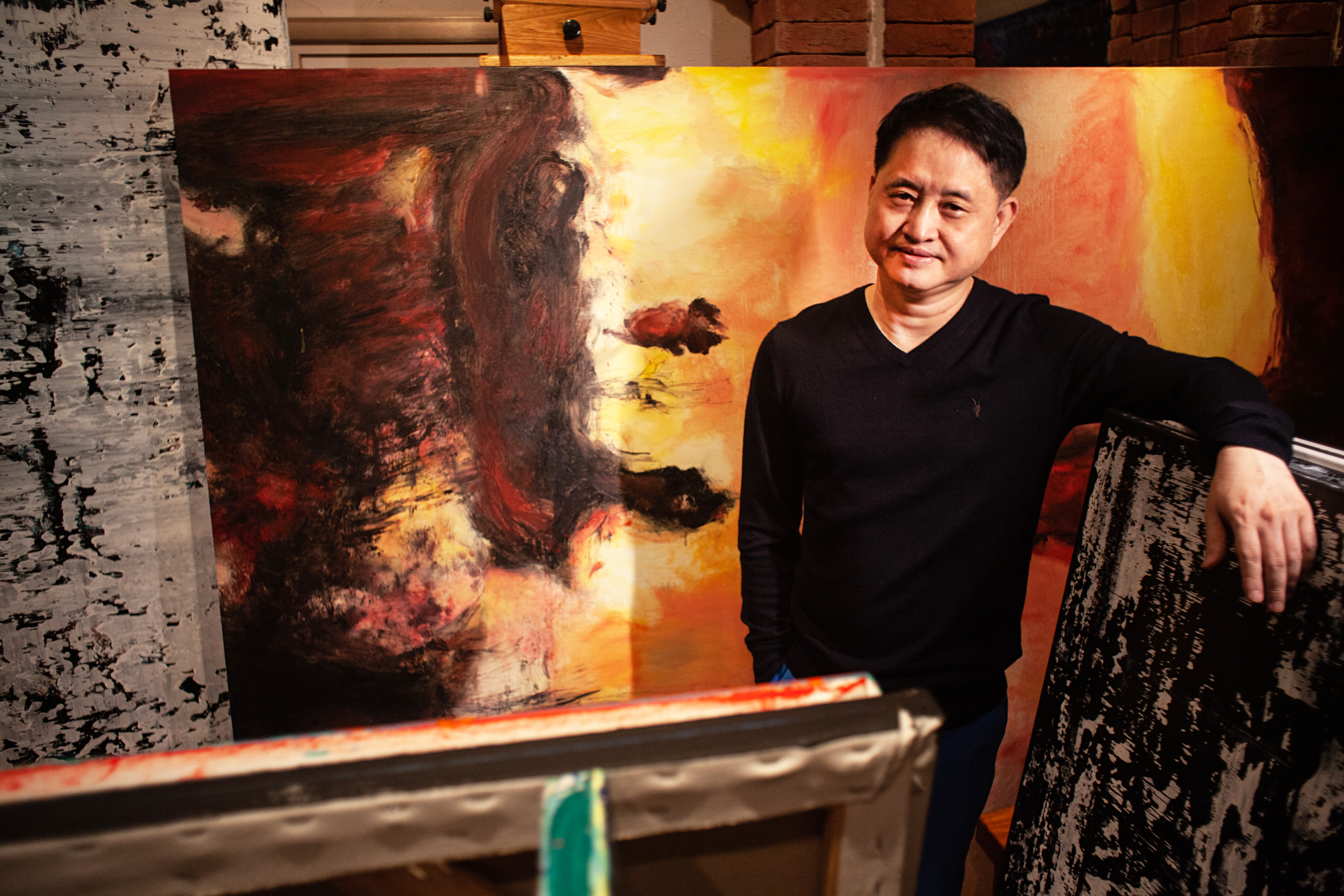
- Born: December 5, 1959 (age 66); Hualien, Taiwan
- Education: Tunghai University，Tsinghua University master's degree of aesthetics，Tsinghua University doctoral candidate of aesthetics

Teng-Hui Huang (a.k.a. Robert Huang) was born on December 5, 1959. He is a Taiwanese artist and entrepreneur. He graduated from Tunghai University, and also holds a master's degree, and Ph.D candidacy from Tsing Hua University in Beijing. From 1985 to 1990, Robert Huang was one of the cofounders of the Utopia, the earliest communal complex rebuild project in Taichung. The project transformed an obsolete complex into one that is aesthetically pleasing.

Because Huang was very interested in the classic book The Little Prince, by Antoine de Saint-Exupéry, he founded Rose House, a rose-themed afternoon tea store in 1990. Huang's early paintings are predominantly about Roses, and thus he is named the "Rose" artist, but he gradually shifted toward abstraction in 2010.

In 2003, his artwork was approved by the Visa cover commission board, and he became the first Chinese artist whose artwork is shown on the cover of a Visa credit card. He then had several paintings covers on Mastercard and JCB cards.

Huang is also a porcelain designer. He was commissioned by Aynsley to design the 2010 Prince William and Kate Middleton commemorative wedding collection and the Queen's coronation collection.
