= Chen Long-bin =

Taiwanese sculptor

- 陳龍斌
- Born: 1964 (age 61–62); Taipei, Taiwan
- Education: Tunghai University (BFA); School of Visual Arts (MFA)
- Occupation: Sculptor

Chen Long-bin (Chinese: 陳龍斌; pinyin: Chén Lóngbīn) is a Taiwanese contemporary sculptor.

== Biography ==
Chen Long-bin was born in 1964 in Taipei, Taiwan. He received a BFA from the Fine Arts Department at Tunghai University, and an MFA from the School of Visual Arts in New York. He is known for incorporating legacy print media — discarded books, newspapers, phonebooks, and magazines — into his sculptures, a style he developed an interest in following the growing popularity of personal computers in the 90s. He uses chainsaws, drills, band saws, sanders, and scissors, along with other carpenter's tools, to shape his busts and figures, which appear stone-like or even marble-like from a distance.

Chen who has won prizes in Europe, Taipei, and Japan, has exhibited extensively at galleries and museums for many years in Japan, Korea, France, (Germany), Hong Kong, Italy, London, Singapore, Taiwan, and the United States, and can also be found in numerous international public and private collections. He has been awarded artist fellowship grants from Taiwan's National Endowment for the Arts, the Joan Mitchell Foundation in New York and the Freeman Foundation. In 1995, he received the Visitor's Prize of the Sixth Triennial of Small Scale Sculpture in Stuttgart, Germany. And in 1998, he received the Silver Prize at the Osaka Triennial in Japan.

For Chen, using recycled materials to make art stresses the challenges presented by endless human consumption and waste, as well as the tantamount ecological problems of waste accumulation and disposal, the destruction of forests, and the mindless use of nonrenewable resources. The reams of used computer paper disprove the assurance of the electronic paper-less office, which instead augments the use of paper, as printing is made much easier. Furthermore, his choice of medium also poses as a commentary on the loss of books as aesthetic objects, which have been replaced by mass-produced cheaply made paperbacks. Books are extremely important to Chen. However, it is not the book itself, but its educational heritage, literary importance, historical knowledge, and the sacredness of the written word that he treasures most.

The type of materials he acquires in a sense determines the sculpture he creates. While in New York, he scoured the streets of Manhattan collecting discarded refuse, scouted offices for their rejected reams of paper, visited brownstone streets to gather cast off telephone books when new ones were distributed. And now, living in Taipei, Chen obtains his material from university libraries and bookstores, publishing companies, archeological museums, and telephone companies.

The special quality of Chen's works is that people can still read the pages. “I try to make sculptures that are appropriate for the content of the books. In my concept, the form and content is united together; the content gives me the idea of the form. Yellow Pages give me one kind of idea; books discarded from libraries inspire different styles…" Often, his art reflects the content of the pages within, such as one hanging installation featuring spirals of books with peepholes in which one can view a scene from the story within the original pages.

== Solo exhibitions ==
• Continental Express, Frederieke Taylor Gallery, New York, 2008
• Chen Long-Bin: Reading Sculpture – Culture Warrior, Plum Blossoms Gallery, Hong Kong, 2006
• Buddha Hurricane, Frederieke Taylor Gallery, 2006
• Reading Sculpture-Los Angeles project, The Lowe Gallery, Santa Monica, CA, 2005
• Reading Sculpture-Kids project, Kidspace at MassMoca, North Adams, MA, 2004
• Reading Sculpture-Atlanta project, The Lowe Gallery, Atlanta, GA, 2004
• Reading Sculpture-Roma project, Galleria Ca'a d'Oro, Rome, Italy, 2004
• Reading Sculpture-Milan project, Galleria Ca'a d'Oro, Milan, Italy, 2004
• Reading Sculpture-Vermont project, Vermont Studio Center, VT, 2004
• Reading Sculpture, Frederieke Taylor Gallery, 2003
• Alternative Study, Eslite Bookstore, Taiwan, 1999
• Taiwan Study, Cultural Affairs Department of Taiwan Provincial Government, Taiwan, 1998
• Humanity, Taipei Fine Arts Museum, Taipei, Taiwan, 1997
• Reading Sculpture, Eight Floor Gallery, New York, 1995
• Culture Empire, American Institute in Taiwan, Taipei, Taiwan, 1994
• Tools, Space 2 Gallery, Taipei, Taiwan, 1992

== Group exhibitions ==
• Rebound, Halsey Gallery, College of Charleston, SC, 2013
• Transformation: From ordinary to extraordinary, various Museums across U.S.A and one in Israel, Curate By Barbara J. Bloemink, 2009
• Holland Paper Biennial, Museum Rijswijk, Holland, 2008
• CODA Museum, Apeldoorn, Holland, 2008
• Outside In: A New Focus on Taiwanese Art, Columbia University and TECO, Taipei Cultural Center, 2008
• Text Messaging, Islip Museum of Art, New York, 2008
• Second Lives: remixing the ordinary, Museum of Arts and Design, New York, 2008
• Pulp Function, Fuller Craft museum, Brockton, MA, U.S.A, 2007
• Thermocline of Art-New Asian Waves, Germany, 2007
• Dalai Lama Portrait Project, Dalai Lama Foundation, Travel Show – Morio Art Museum in Tokyo, Cartier Foundation in Paris and Museum in London, Taipei, Berlin, New York, LA, 2006
• Extreme Materials, Memorial Art Gallery, University of Rochester, New York, 2006
• Miami Art Fair, Frederieke Taylor Gallery, Florida, 2005
• Do a Book: Asian Artists Summer Project 2004, Plum Blossoms Gallery, New York, NY, 2004
• The Invisible Tread – Buddhist Spirit in Contemporary Art, Snug Harbor Cultural Center, New York, NY, 2003
• The Gravity of the Immaterial, Total Museum of Contemporary Art, Seoul, 2002
• Absolut-2001 Los Angeles International, Biennial Art Invitational, Robert Berman Gallery, Santa Monica, CA, 2001
• New Minds – Artistic Creations in Motion, Taipei Fine Arts Museum, the International Artists’ Village, Planning Office, CCA, Executive Yuan, 2001
• The Gravity of the Immaterial, MoCA Taipei, Taipei, 2001
• Osaka Triennial 2001, the Contemporary Art Space Osaka (CASO), Osaka, 2001
• Landscape on the Shelf, American Cultural Center, Taipei, 2000
• Mondo Tiara, Sculpture to Wear Gallery, Santa Monica, U.S.A., 2000
• San Francisco Art Fair, Robert Berman Gallery, San Francisco, CA, 2000
• Volume & Form Singapore 1999, Singapore City, National Library, Singapore, 1999
• Play, Paper factory-International Paper Art Festival, Cheng Chuen Cotton Paper Foundation & Cultural Affairs Department Taiwan Provincial Government, Taiwan, 1999
• Vision of Pluralism – Contemporary Art in Taiwan, 1988–1999, China Art Museum, Beijing. Mountain Art Museum, Kaohsiung, 1999
• New Voice: Contemporary art Dialogue Among Taipei, Hong Kong, and Shanghai, National Taiwan Arts Education Institute, Taipei, Hong Kong Art Fair, Fubon Art Foundation, Taipei, 1998
• Reflection and Reconsideration 2.28 Commemorative Exhibition, Taipei Fine Arts Museum, Taipei, 1998
• The Art Season of Taipei Rapid Train Station, National Art Institute, Taipei, 1998
• Osaka Trienniale 1998-Sculpture, Osaka Contemporary Art Center, Osaka Gateway to Wisdom, Fubon Art Foundation, Taiwan University, Taipei, 1998
• Feast of Mind, Buffet of Art, Fubon Art Foundation, Taipei, 1997
• Our Deities, ISE Art Foundation, New York Personal Best, Chassie Post Gallery, Atlanta, Georgia, 1996
• A Dialogue of Contemporary Sculpture in Asia, Taipei Fine Arts Museum, Taipei, 1995 • Object Orbit, Chinese-American Arts Council, New York, 1995
• obCkession, TZ'art & Co., New York, 1995
• Triennial der Kleinplastik 1995, Europe-Ostaien, Stuttgart, Germany, 1995
• America vs China, Window Dressing, TZ'art & Co., New York, 1995
• New York Area MFA Exhibition, Hunter College, Co-Sponsored by CAA, New York, 1994
• The Entering Show of Taipei Fine Arts Museum Biannual, Taipei, Taiwan, 1994
• Ross Chambers, Long-Bin Chen and John Lavin, SVA Gallery, New York, 1994
• Taiwan Map, Window Dressing, Dimension Art Center, Taipei, 1994
• Curious Structures, Visual Art Gallery, New York, 1993
• Play, Work, Think, Visual Art Gallery, New York, 1993
• Time Duration, Dimension Art Center, Taipei, Taiwan, 1992
• Selling Specialty, Go Go Gallery, Taipei, Taiwan, 1992
• Can Art Be Heritable? Space 2 Gallery, Taipei, Taiwan, 1992
• The 5th International Print Biennial of Taiwan, Taipei Fine Arts Museum, Taipei, 1991
• Vernacular, Space 2 Gallery, Taipei, Taiwan, 1991
• Shih Hsing New Artist, Shih Hsing Gallery, Taipei, Taiwan, 1987

== Awards ==
• Freeman Foundation Fellowship, 2003
• Grant of the Nation Endowment for Arts, Taiwan, 2001
• 1998 Grant of the Nation Endowment for Arts, Taiwan, 1998
• The Silver Prize of Osaka Triennial 1998 (sculpture), Osaka, Japan, 1998
• 1997 Grant of the Nation Endowment for Arts, Taiwan, 1997
• 1996 Grant Award of the Joan Mitchell Foundation, New York, 1996
• Visitors Price of the 6 Triennial of Small Scale Sculpture, Stuttgart, Germany, 1995
• Tung-Hai University Fine Arts Prize, Taiwan, 1988
• 12th Shih Hsing New Artist Prize, Taipei, Taiwan, 1987
• National Print Prize, Taiwan, 1985

== Professional Activities ==
• Sacatar Residency artist, Brazil, 2006
• MassMOCA Residency artist, 2005
• Vermont Studio Center Residency artist, U.S.A., 2004
• Snug Harbor Cultural Center Residency artist, U.S.A., 2003
• 18th Street Art Complex Residency artist, U.S.A., 2000
• Lecturer of Shin-Jan University, Taipei, 1997
• Curator for Incertitude, a group show of Chinese and Taiwanese artist, Eight Floor Gallery, New York, 1996
• Curator for Under Naked, Group show of Chinese and Taiwanese artists, 465 Gallery, New York, 1994
• Program director for Space 2 Gallery, Taipei, 1991

== Collections and Projects ==
• West Collection, Philadelphia, U.S.A., 2004
• Taiwan National Museum, Taiwan, 1999
• Osaka Culture Bureau, Japan, 1998
• Allan Chasanoff, Private Collection, New York, 1995
• Suho Paper Museum, TaipeiLibenn Aroma Inc., South Ban, Indiana, U.S.A., 1994
• Hsiung Shih Fine Art Magazine, Taipei, 1986
