= H. Milton Stewart School of Industrial and Systems Engineering =

Department in Georgia Tech, Public university in Atlanta, Georgia, US

The H. Milton Stewart School of Industrial and Systems Engineering is a department in the Georgia Institute of Technology's College of Engineering dedicated to education and research in industrial engineering. The school is named after H. Milton Stewart, a local philanthropist and successful businessman who formerly graduated from the BSIE undergraduate program.

Unlike similar programs at other schools, the School of Industrial and Systems Engineering at Georgia Tech focuses on core disciplines for both Industrial Engineering (such as manufacturing and quality control) and Systems Engineering (such as global logistics and system optimization). U.S. News & World Report has ranked the undergraduate program at number one for the past 25 consecutive years, and the graduate program at number one for the past 36.

== Founding ==
The "industrial option" for mechanical engineering was first offered at then Georgia School of Technology in 1924. The Department of Industrial Engineering was created in 1945 with Frank Groseclose as its first director and professor. In 1948, the department was elevated to its current status of School of Industrial Engineering with Groseclose serving as its first dean.
