= Xitun District =

District of Taichung, Taiwan

Coordinates: 24°10′58.5″N 120°37′32.6″E

Xitun 西屯區 Situn
- District
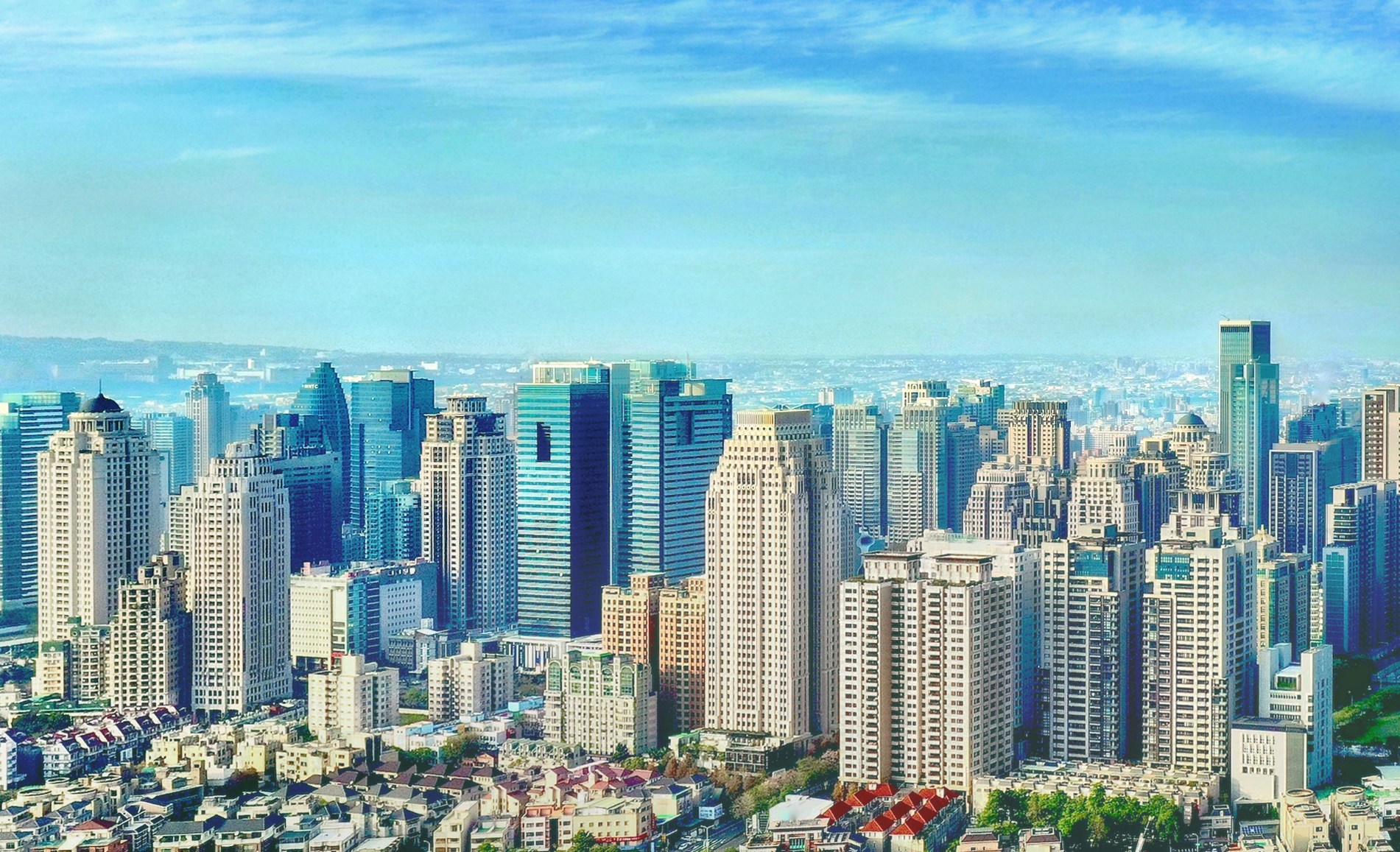

- Xitun District in Taichung City
- Location: Taichung, Taiwan

Government
  - Mayor: 何國裕

Area
  - Total: 39.8 km^{2} (15.4 sq mi)

Population (February 2023)
  - Total: 232,746
  - Rank: 2 out of 29
  - Density: 5,850/km^{2} (15,100/sq mi)
- Website: www.xitun.taichung.gov.tw (in Chinese)

Xitun District or Situn District (Chinese: 西屯區; pinyin: Xītún Qū; lit. 'western settlement') is the second-most populated district of Taichung, Taiwan. It is located on the western side of the city. Once considered part of the countryside, the district has seen rapid growth in recent years with department store and office towers in the redevelopment zone. Taichung City Hall is located in the district.

== History ==
The original inhabitants of the area were the Pazeh people, who inhabited the Taichung Basin. The first Han settlers arrived in 1701, led by Liao Chao Kong (廖朝孔) and Chang Da Jing (張達京). As a result, the Pazeh people were pushed out of the area, and most of them migrated to Puli, Nantou. Many of its prehistory artifacts can be found at the Huilai Monument Archaeology Park.

The district was part of Taichung provincial city before the merger with Taichung County to form Taichung special municipality on 25 December 2010.

== Geography ==
Xitun is located on the western side of Taichung City. It is situated within the Taichung Basin, with the western part of the district on the slopes of the Dadu Plateau. It borders Daya to the north, Shalu and Longjing to the west, Dadu and Nantun to the south, and Beitun, North, and West districts to the east.

== Administrative divisions ==
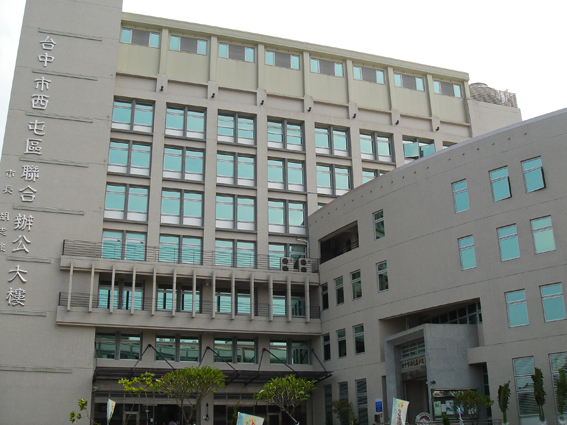
Xitun District Office

List of Villages in Xitun

English name	Chinese name
Lincuo Village	林厝里
Yongan Village	永安里
Fulian Village	福聯里
Furui Village	福瑞里
Fulin Village	福林里
Fuya Village	福雅里
Fuan Village	福安里
Fuen Village	福恩里
Fuzhong Village	福中里
Fuhe Village	福和里
Xiehe Village	協和里
Gangwei Village	港尾里
Pengcheng Village	鵬程里

English name	Chinese name
Shangde Village	上德里
Shangan Village	上安里
Shangshi Village	上石里
Xiping Village	西平里
Xian Village	西安里
Xidun Village	西墩里
Zhishan Village	至善里
Chaoyang Village	潮洋里
Guangfu Village	廣福里
Pengjia Village	逢甲里
Pengfu Village	逢福里
Longtan Village	龍潭里
Huilai Village	惠來里

English name	Chinese name
Hede Village	何德里
Hecheng Village	何成里
Heming Village	何明里
Hefu Village	何福里
Hecuo Village	何厝里
He-an Village	何安里
Heyuan Village	何源里
Heren Village	何仁里
Henan Village	何南里
Dafu Village	大福里
Dapeng Village	大鵬里
Dashi Village	大石里
Dahe Village	大河裡

== Economy ==
- Taichung Science Park
- Taichung Shuinan Economic and Trade Park

== Education ==
- Feng Chia University
- Overseas Chinese University
- Tunghai University
- National Wen-Hua Senior High School

== Hospitals ==
The Taichung Veterans General Hospital and Cheng Ching Hospital Chung Kang Branch is located in Xitun.

== Transportation ==
Xitun is served by the following national roads:

- National Freeway 1: Taichung and Daya Interchanges are located in the district.
- Provincial Highway 74
- Provincial Highway 1B
- Provincial Highway 12: Also known as Taiwan Boulevard; major road of Taichung running straight through Xitun.

The district is served by buses, including a bus lane along Taiwan Boulevard that was the former BRT system. The Taichung MRT Green line, running on Wenxin Road, has 3 stations in the district.

== Tourist attractions ==
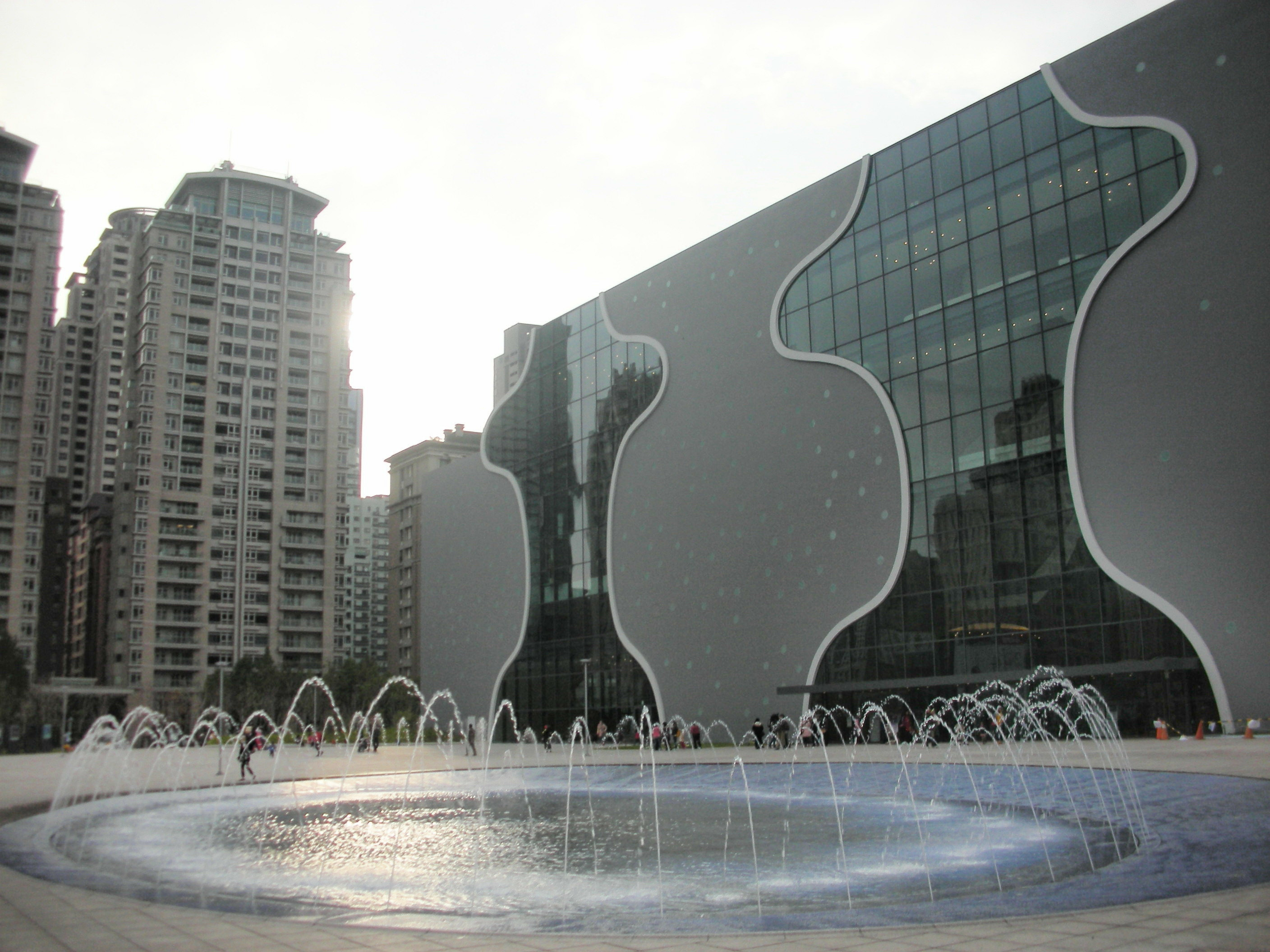
National Taichung Theater

- Fengchia Night Market, one of the most renowned night markets in Taiwan, located adjacent to Feng Chia University
- Huilai Monument Archaeology Park, an archaeological site where Neolithic objects were uncovered
- Luce Memorial Chapel, an iconic chapel located within Tunghai University
- National Taichung Theater
- Taichung Football Field
- Taichung Metropolitan Park, a 217-acre park located on the Dadu Plateau

Xitun Football Field is home to Taichung Blue Whale, Taichung City, Taichung Futuro, Taichung Rock, Taichung San Hai Tun NTUS and Taichung Sakura. The venue was built by the Taichung City Government in 2024.

== See also ==
- Shuikutou, an early name for the western area of the district.
