= Taichung Basin =

Basin in Central Taiwan

Coordinates: 24.0150°N 120.6641°E

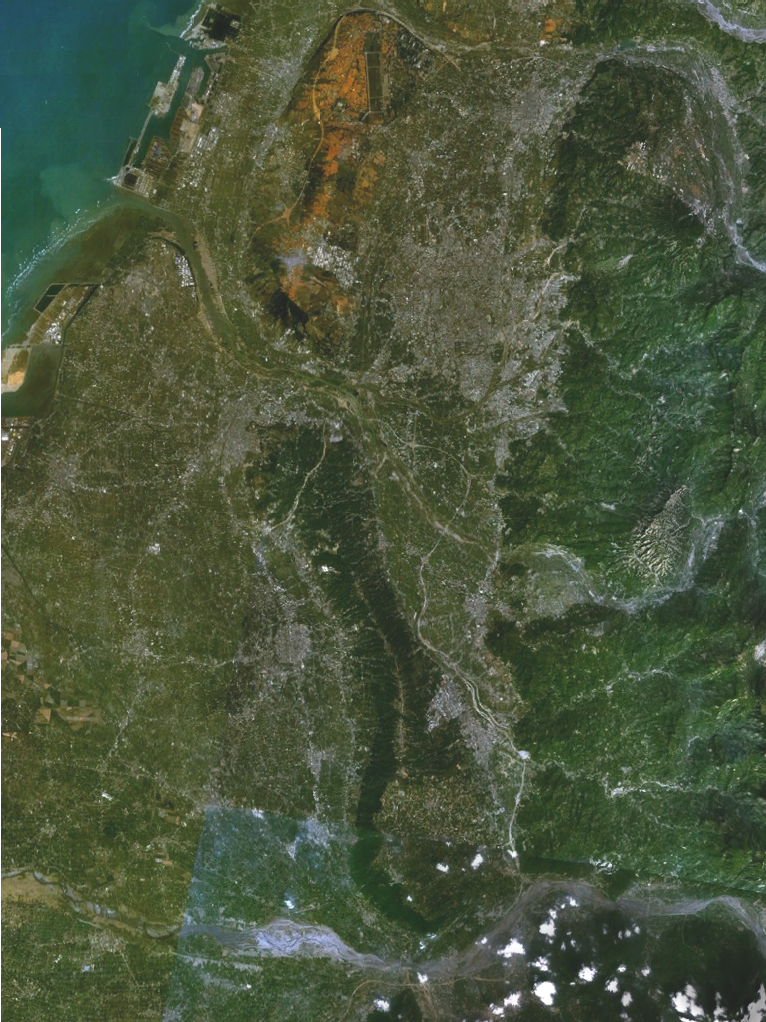
Satellite picture of Taichung Basin.

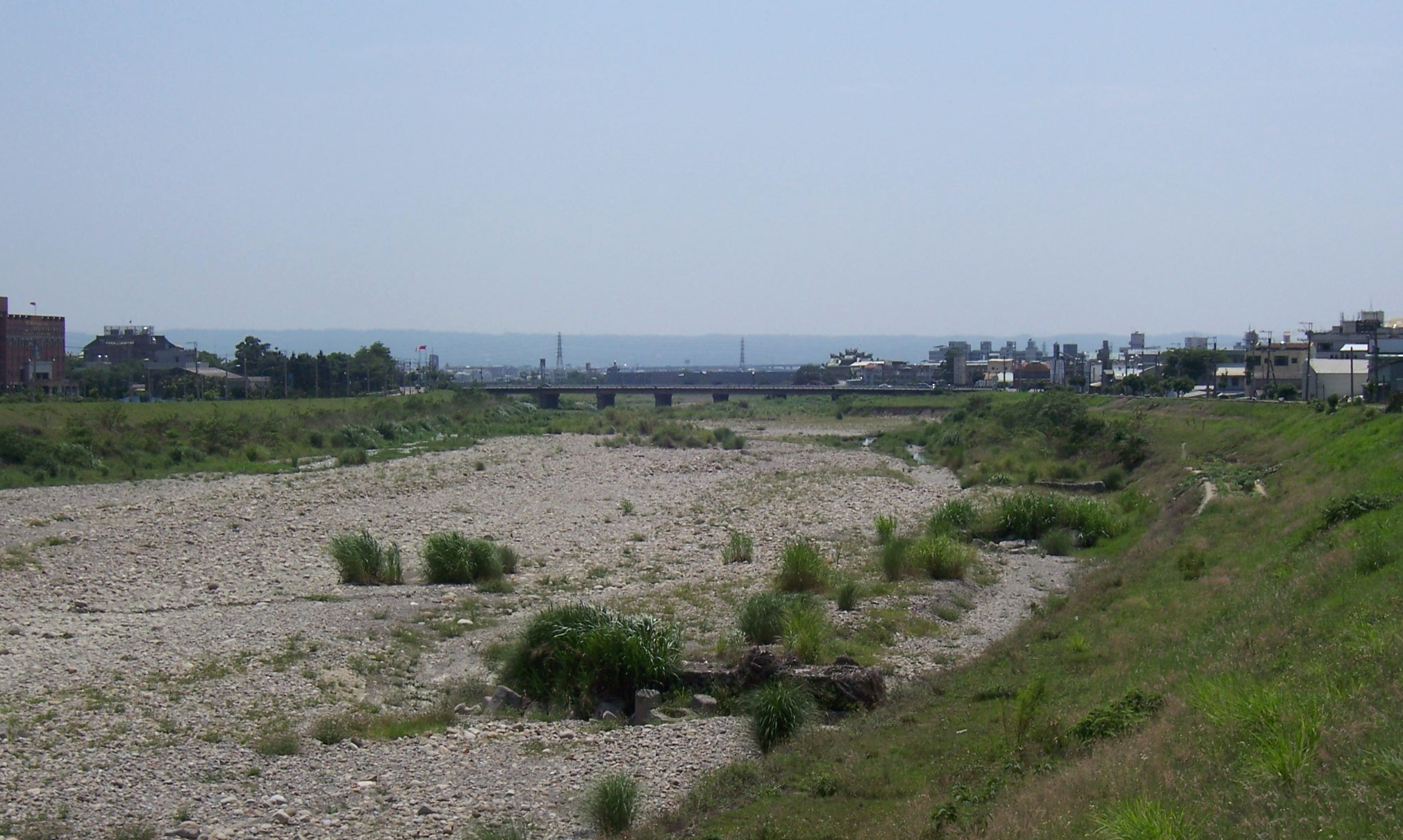
The riverbed of Caohu River in Taichung Basin.

The Taichung Basin (Chinese: 臺中盆地; pinyin: Táizhōng Péndì), located in the central region of western Taiwan, is the third largest metropolitan area in Taiwan. It occupies parts of Taichung City, Nantou County and Changhua County. The basin borders the Choshui River in the south; the hill lands of Nantou in the east; the Tatu Plateau in the northwest; and the Pakua Plateau in the southwest. A notch connecting the Taichung Basin to the seacoast of Taichung City stretches between the two plateaus.

== History ==
Prior to Dutch and Chinese colonization in the 1600s, the Taichung Basin was inhabited by the Pazeh, Babuzabhb, Cou, and Hoanya indigenous Taiwanese peoples.

== Panoramic photography ==
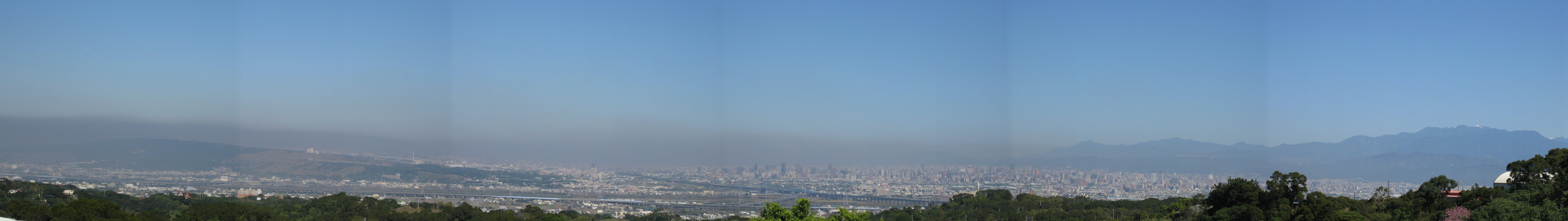
West←Downtown Taichung City is located in the Taichung Basin.→East

== See also ==
- Geography of Taiwan
