= Dadu Plateau =

Plateau in Taichung, Taiwan

Coordinates: 24.1458°N 120.5789°E

Dadu Plateau 大肚台地
- Plateau
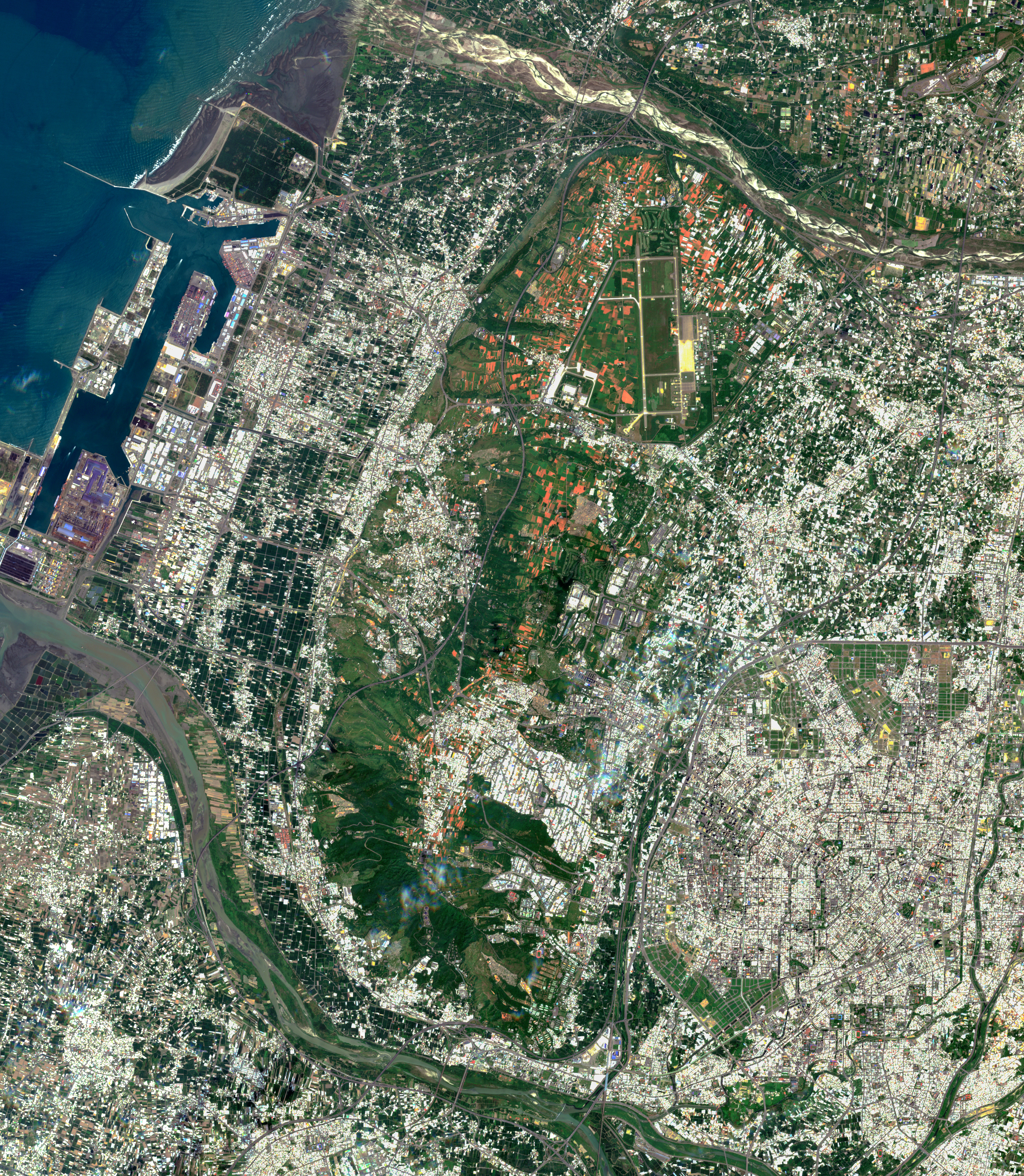
- View from Sentinel-2 satellite in 2020

- Location within Taiwan
- Coordinates
- Location: Taichung, Taiwan
- Geology: Plateau

Dimensions
  - Length: 20 km (12 mi)
  - Width: 7 km (4.3 mi)
- Highest elevation: 310 m (1,020 ft)
- Surface elevation: 151 m (495 ft)

The Dadu Plateau (Chinese: 大肚台地), also known as Dadu Mountain or Dadushan (Chinese: 大肚山; Pe̍h-ōe-jī: Tōa-tō͘-soaⁿ), is a plateau that stretches across Taichung, Taiwan. It borders the Taichung Basin in the east and the seacoast of Taichung in the west, and lies between the Dajia River and the Dadu River. The plateau is long and narrow, with a length of about 20 km north to south and a width of about 7 km east to west. Its average elevation is about 151 m above sea level, with its highest peak at 310 m.

== See also ==
- Dadu, Taichung
- Kingdom of Middag
