= List of defunct international airports =

The following is a list of airports that have had commercial/civil and international air service in the past and no longer have scheduled commercial/passenger operations.

== Africa ==
Airport	City served	Date of closure	Notes
Casablanca–Anfa Airport	(Morocco) Casablanca	2007	Replaced with Mohammed V International Airport in Nouaceur.
Durban International Airport	(South Africa) Durban	30 April 2010	Replaced with King Shaka International Airport in La Mercy.
Eastleigh Airport	(Kenya) Nairobi	1958 (civil)	Commissioned as Moi Air Base. Replaced with Jomo Kenyatta International Airport.
El Nouzha Airport	(Egypt) Alexandria	2024	Replaced with Borg El Arab International Airport in Amreya, which opened in 2010.
Francisco Mendes International Airport	(Cape Verde) Praia	6 October 2005	Replaced with Nelson Mandela International Airport, around 2 kilometers to the north. The former runway became an access road to the new airport.
Inezgane Airport	(Morocco) Agadir	1991	Commissioned as a military airport. Replaced with Al Massira Airport.
Khartoum International Airport	(Sudan) Khartoum	15 April 2023	The airport has been shut down since it was stormed and occupied on 15 April 2023 during the Battle of Khartoum. The current airport is scheduled to be replaced by the New Khartoum International Airport in Omdourman 40 kilometres (25 mi) south of the centre of Khartoum.
Léopold Sédar Senghor International Airport	(Senegal) Dakar	March 2020 (passenger)	Only operating for Charter and Cargo services. Replaced with Blaise Diagne International Airport in Ndiass, Thiès Region.
Lideta Airport	(Ethiopia) Addis Ababa	1962 (?)	The airport had served the nation for nearly three decades. Replaced with Addis Ababa Bole International Airport.
Lusaka City Airport	(Zambia) Lusaka	Unknown (civil)	Replaced with Kenneth Kaunda International Airport.
Matsapha Airport	(Eswatini) Mbabane	29 September 2014	Replaced with King Mswati III International Airport
Mejametalana Airport	(Lesotho) Maseru	1974? (civil)	Commissioned as a military airport. Replaced with Moshoeshoe I International Airport.
Nouakchott International Airport	(Mauritania) Nouakchott	23 June 2016	Replaced with Nouakchott–Oumtounsy International Airport.
Palmietfontein Airport	(South Africa) Johannesburg	1952	Replaced with O. R. Tambo International Airport in Kempton Park.
Port Sudan Old Airport	Port Sudan	1992 (Civil?)	Commissioned as Port Sudan Military Airport. Replaced with Port Sudan New International Airport
Rand Airport	(South Africa) Johannesburg	1948	Replaced with Palmietfontein Airport in Thokoza. Still open today for general aviation.
Sherbro International Airport	(Sierra Leone) Bonthe	2002	Possibly due to the Sierra Leone Civil War.
Sidi Ifni Airport	(Morocco) Sidi Ifni	1969	Iberia once served this airport.
Simi-Simi Airport	(Democratic Republic of the Congo) Kisangani	Year unknown	
Simon Mwansa Kapwepwe International Airport in Itawa	(Zambia) Ndola	7 October 2021	Commissioned as Peter Zuze Air Force Base. Replaced with the new Simon Mwansa Kapwepwe International Airport (adjacent to the Dag Hammarskjöld Crash Site Memorial).
Tripoli International Airport	(Libya) Tripoli	July 2014 (Passenger services?)	Commissioned as a military airport. Replaced with Mitiga International Airport.
Wingfield Aerodrome	(South Africa) Cape Town	1954	Replaced with the new Cape Town International Airport in Matroosfontein.

== Asia ==
Airport	City served	Date of closure	Notes
Abu Dhabi Airfield	(United Arab Emirates) Abu Dhabi	1969	Replaced with Al Bateen Executive Airport.
Adana Şakirpaşa Airport	(Turkey) Cilicia	10 August 2024 (passenger)	Replaced with Çukurova International Airport. Şakirpaşan is now used primarily for pilot training.
Al Bateen Executive Airport	(United Arab Emirates) Abu Dhabi	2 January 1982	Replaced with Zayed International Airport. Still open today for general aviation.
Marka International Airport	(Jordan) Amman	1983 (Passenger services)	Replaced with Queen Alia International Airport. Still open today for general aviation, and moreover as an aviation education and training hub, and also sees freight operations. It serves as the home base for Arab Wings and Jordan International Air Cargo.
Attapeu International Airport	(Laos) Attapeu	October 2016	Commissioned as a military airport.
Bacolod City Domestic Airport	(Philippines) Bacolod	17 January 2008	Replaced with the new Bacolod–Silay Airport in Barangay Bagtic.
Begumpet Airport	(India) Hyderabad	23 March 2008	Replaced with Rajiv Gandhi International Airport in Shamshabad.
Beijing Nanyuan Airport	(China) Beijing	25 September 2019 (civil); 30 September 2019 (military)	Nanyuan was a joint military-civil aerodrome until 2019; in 2019 all commercial traffic was moved to the newly-built Beijing Daxing International Airport. Military operations remained at Nanyuan until 2019, when it too was relocated to Daxing.
Benazir Bhutto International Airport	(Pakistan) Islamabad	3 May 2018	Replaced with the new Islamabad International Airport in Attock.
Old Bintulu Airport	(Malaysia) Bintulu Division	30 March 2003	On 1 July 1968, Malaysia-Singapore Airlines introduced scheduled Fokker 27 services into Bintulu, the airport is replaced by The new Bintulu Airport
Brunei old Airport	(Brunei) Bandar Seri Begawan	1974	Replaced with the new Brunei International Airport.
Buyant-Ukhaa International Airport	(Mongolia) Ulaanbaatar	4 July 2021	Replaced with the new Chinggis Khaan International Airport in Sergelen.
Cha-ian Airport	(Thailand) Nakhon Si Thammarat	1 December 1998 (civil)	Commissioned as a military airport. Replaced with Nakhon Si Thammarat Airport.
Changchun Dafangshen Airport	(China) Changchun	27 August 2005 (civil)	Dafangshen was a joint military-civil aerodrome until 2005; in 2005 all commercial traffic was moved to the newly-built Changchun Longjia International Airport, while Dafangshen was reverted to sole military use.
Changsha Datuopu Airport	(China) Changsha	29 August 1989 (civil)	Datuopu was a joint military-civil aerodrome until 1989; in 1989 all commercial traffic was moved to the newly-built Changsha Huanghua International Airport, while Datuopu was reverted to sole military use.
Chongqing Baishiyi Airport	(China) Chongqing	21 January 1990 (civil)	Baishiyi was a joint military-civil aerodrome until 1990; in 1990 all commercial traffic was moved to the newly-built Chongqing Jiangbei International Airport, while Baishiyi was reverted to sole military use.
Darin Airport	(Saudi Arabia) Eastern Province	1939	Darin Airport, located in eastern Saudi Arabia, is considered the country's first airport, established around 1911 during World War I and served as a military airport.
Dera Ghazi Khan Airport	(Pakistan) Dera Ghazi Khan	Unknown (2017?)	Closed without any reason.
Dhahran International Airport	(Saudi Arabia) Dhahran	1999	Commissioned as King Abdulaziz Air Base. Replaced with King Fahd International Airport.
Eilat Airport	(Israel) Eilat	18 March 2019	Replaced with Ramon Airport.
Fukuoka Airport	(Japan) Fukuoka	1965	Some flights were available to China, Korea, and Southeast Asia nations.
Fuzhou Yixu Airport	(China) Fuzhou	23 June 1997 (civil)	Yixu was a joint military-civil aerodrome until 1997; in 1997 all commercial traffic was moved to the newly-built Fuzhou Changle International Airport, while Yixu was reverted to sole military use.
Gangneung Airport	(South Korea) Gangwon	2 April 2002 (civil)	Commissioned as Gangneung Air Base. Replaced with Yangyang International Airport
Ganzhou Huangjin Airport (former)	(China) Ganzhou	25 March 2008	Replaced with the new Ganzhou Huangjin Airport in Nankang.
Gia Lam Airport	(Vietnam) Hanoi	2 January 1978	Replaced with Noi Bai International Airport in Sóc Sơn.
Gongxingdun Airport	(China) Lanzhou	26 July 1970	Replaced with Lanzhou Zhongchuan International Airport.
Guangzhou Baiyun International Airport (former)	(China) Guangzhou	5 August 2004	Replaced with the new Guangzhou Baiyun International Airport in Huadu.
Guilin Qifengling Airport	(China) Guilin	1 October 1996 (civil)	Qifengling was a joint military-civil aerodrome until 1996; in 1996 all commercial traffic was moved to the newly-built Guilin Liangjiang International Airport, while Qifengling was reverted to sole military use.
HAL Airport	(India) Bengaluru	24 May 2008	Replaced with Kempegowda International Airport in Devanahalli.
Hangzhou Jianqiao Airport	(China) Hangzhou	29 December 2000 (civil)	Jianqiao was a joint military-civil aerodrome until 2000; in 2000 all commercial traffic was moved to the newly-built Hangzhou Xiaoshan International Airport, while Jianqiao was reverted to sole military use.
Hankow Airfield	(China) Wuhan	25 December 2007	Replaced with Wuhan Tianhe International Airport.
Hefei Luogang Airport	(China) Hefei	30 May 2013	Replaced with Hefei Xinqiao International Airport. Site redeveloped into Luogang Park.
Hiroshima–Nishi Airport	(Japan) Hiroshima	29 October 1993	Replaced with the new Hiroshima Airport in Mihara.
Hodeida International Airport	(Yemen) Hodeida	2015?	there are no longer any scheduled services at the airport after Yemenia suspended all routes in 2015 due to the ongoing regional conflict, the airport is also damaged due to Battle of Hudaida
Ishigaki Airport (former)	(Japan) Ishigaki	6 March 2013	Replaced with the new Ishigaki Airport.
Jefman Airport	(Indonesia) Sorong	20 March 2004	Replaced with Domine Eduard Osok Airport.
Jerusalem International Airport	(Israel) / (Palestine) Jerusalem	October 2000	
Juhu Aerodrome	(India) Mumbai	1948	
Kai Tak Airport	Hong Kong	6 July 1998	Replaced with the new Hong Kong International Airport in Chek Lap Kok. Site redeveloped as the Kai Tak Development Area.
Kallang Airport	Singapore	21 August 1955	Replaced with Paya Lebar Airport. The airport’s terminal still exists today.
Kandara Airport	(Saudi Arabia) Jeddah and Mecca	May 1981	Replaced with King Abdulaziz International Airport. Being known for being the first airport to be built in Saudi Arabia
Kemayoran Airport	(Indonesia) Jakarta	31 March 1985	Replaced with Soekarno–Hatta International Airport in Tangerang. Site redeveloped into Jakarta International Expo.
Kokura Airport	(Japan) Kitakyushu	16 March 2006	Until 2005, Kokura Airport was originally called Kitakyushu Airport. It was then renamed to Kokura Airport until the aerodrome closed in 2006 and replaced with the new Kitakyushu Airport.
Kunming Wujiaba International Airport	(China) Kunming	28 June 2012	Replaced with Kunming Changshui International Airport.
Lahug Airport	(Philippines) Cebu	27 April 1966	Replaced with Mactan–Cebu International Airport. Site redeveloped into Cebu IT Park.
Legazpi Airport	(Philippines) Legazpi	7 October 2021	Replaced with Bicol International Airport.
Lianyungang Baitabu Airport	(China) Lianyungang	2 December 2021 (civil)	Baitabu was a joint military-civil aerodrome until 2021; in 2021 all commercial traffic was moved to the newly-built Lianyungang Huaguoshan International Airport, while Baitabu was reverted to sole military use.
Lumbia Airport	(Philippines) Cagayan de Oro	15 June 2013 (civil)	Commissioned as Lumbia Airfield. Replaced with Laguindingan Airport in Barangay Moog.
Lutong Airport	(Malaysia) Miri	1980s	Replaced with the new Miri Airport.
Luzhou Lantian Airport	(China) Luzhou	10 September 2018 (civil); June 2021 (military)	Lantian was a joint military-civil aerodrome until 2018; in 2018 all commercial traffic was moved to the newly-built Luzhou Yunlong Airport. Military operations remained at Lantian until 2021, when it too was relocated to Yunlong. Site redeveloped into Luzhou Linyu Yangtze River Bridge.
Malaybalay Airport	(Philippines) Malaybalay	1990s	
Mandurriao Airport	(Philippines) Iloilo	14 June 2007	Replaced with the new Iloilo International Airport in Cabatuan. Site redeveloped into Iloilo Business Park and Iloilo Convention Center.
Maria Cristina Airport	(Philippines) Iligan	15 June 2013 (civil)	Replaced with Laguindingan Airport in Barangay Moog. Still open today for general aviation.
Mazzeh Airport	(Syria) Damascus	Early 1960s (Civil)	Commissioned as Mezzeh Air Base. Replaced with Damascus International Airport.
Mokpo Airport	(South Korea) Mokpo	November 2007 (civil)	Commissioned as Mokpo Air Base. Replaced with Muan International Airport.
Nanchang Xiangtang Airport	(China) Nanchang	10 September 1999 (civil)	Xiangtang was a joint military-civil aerodrome until 1999; in 1999 all commercial traffic was moved to the newly-built Nanchang Changbei International Airport, while Xiangtang was reverted to sole military use.
Nanjing Dajiaochang Airport	(China) Nanjing	28 June 1997 (civil); 30 July 2015 (military)	Dajiaochang was a joint military-civil aerodrome until 1997; in 1997 all commercial traffic was moved to the newly-built Nanjing Lukou International Airport. Military operations remained at Dajiaochang until 2015, when it was moved to the newly-built Luhe-Ma'an Air Base.
Nicosia International Airport	(Cyprus) Nicosia	1974	Nicosia Airport was closed after the Turkish invasion of Cyprus: As such, the U.N. Buffer Zone between Cyprus and Northern Cyprus was formed, in which the airport is located on. All civil traffic moved to Larnaca International Airport in the Republic of Cyprus, and Ercan International Airport in Northern Cyprus.
Nielson Field	(Philippines) Manila	1948	
Old Chiang Rai Airport	(Thailand) Chiang Rai	5 August 1992	Replaced with the new Chiang Rai International Airport.
Paya Lebar Airport	Singapore	29 December 1981 (civil)	Commissioned as Paya Lebar Air Base. Replaced with Changi Airport.
Phnom Penh International Airport	(Cambodia) Phnom Penh	8 September 2025	Replaced with Techo International Airport.
Pingtung Airport	(Taiwan) Pingtung	August 2011 (civil)	Now becoming a part of Pingtung AFB.
Polonia International Airport	(Indonesia) Medan	25 July 2013	Commissioned as Soewondo Air Force Base. Replaced with Kualanamu International Airport in Deli Serdang Regency.
Qingdao Liuting International Airport	(China) Qingdao	12 August 2021	Replaced with Qingdao Jiaodong International Airport.
Quilon Aerodrome	(India) Thiruvananthapuram	1932	Replaced with the new Thiruvananthapuram International Airport in Chacka.
Qui Nhơn Airfield	(Vietnam) Quy Nhon	1975	Replaced with Phu Cat Airport.
Rajkot Airport	(India) Rajkot	10 September 2023	Replaced with the new Rajkot International Airport in Hirasar. Still open today for general aviation.
Riyadh International Airport	(Saudi Arabia) Riyadh	16 November 1983 (civil)	Commissioned as Riyadh Air Base. Replaced with King Khalid International Airport.
Safdarjung Airport	(India) New Delhi	1962 (civil)	Replaced with Indira Gandhi International Airport in Palam. Closed for public use in 2002, it is now used for maintenance runs and helicopter rides. During the 2010 Commonwealth Games it was used as an airstrip for the VVVIP movement of Govt. of India officials.
Şanlıurfa Airport	(Turkey) Şanlıurfa	17 June 2007	Replaced with Şanlıurfa GAP Airport in Gölgen.
Sde Dov Airport	(Israel) Tel Aviv	30 June 2019	
Selaparang Airport	(Indonesia) Mataram–Lombok	30 September 2011	Replaced with Zainuddin Abdul Madjid International Airport in Central Lombok Regency.
Shanghai Jiangwan Airport	(China) Shanghai	June 1994	Replaced with Shanghai Pudong International Airport, which opened on 1 October 1999. Site turned over to the city of Shanghai in 1997 for redevelopment as a residential area and a park.
Shanghai Longhua Airport	(China) Shanghai	August 1966	Replaced with Shanghai Hongqiao International Airport, which originally opened on 8 July 1929.
Shantou Waisha Airport	(China) Shantou	15 December 2011 (civil)	Shantou Waisha was a joint military-civil aerodrome until 2011; in 2011 all commercial traffic was moved to the newly-built Jieyang Chaoshan International Airport, while Shantou Waisha was reverted to sole military use.
Shuinan Airport	(Taiwan) Taichung	5 March 2004 (civil); August 2012 (military)	Replaced with the new Taichung International Airport. Site redeveloped into Taichung Shuinan Economic and Trade Park.
Siem Reap International Airport	(Cambodia) Siem Reap	16 October 2023	Replaced with the new Siem Reap–Angkor International Airport in Soutr Nikom.
Sra Pathum Airfield	(Thailand) Bangkok	27 March 1914	Replaced with Don Mueang International Airport. Site redeveloped into a horse racing venue as the Royal Bangkok Sports Club.
Sungai Besi Airport	(Malaysia) Kuala Lumpur	30 August 1965 (civil); 16 March 2018 (military)	Sungai Besi Airport was a joint military-civil aerodrome until 1965; in 1965 all commercial traffic was moved to Sultan Abdul Aziz Shah Airport in Subang. Military operations remained at Sungai Besi until 2018, when it was moved to Bandar Sri Sendayan in Negeri Sembilan.
Surin Bhakdi Airport	(Thailand) Surin	Year unknown	The airport was open from 2002 to 2003 when the now defunct Air Andaman was the sole airline operating there, and reopened in 2013. The airport was briefly served by Nok Air. As of January 2020, there is no scheduled airline service at the airport. Nok Air now offers air service to nearby Buriram Airport with a bus connection to Surin.
Suzhou Guangfu Airport	(China) Suzhou	29 October 2002 (civil)	Suzhou Guangfu was a joint military-civil aerodrome until 2002; in 2004 all commercial traffic was moved to the newly-built Wuxi Shuofang Airport, while Suzhou Guangfu was reverted to sole military use.
Tachikawa Airfield	(Japan) Tokyo	25 August 1931 (civil)	Replaced with Haneda Airport.
Tagbilaran Airport	(Philippines) Tagbilaran	27 November 2018	Replaced with Bohol–Panglao International Airport in Barangay Tawala.
Taiz International Airport	(Yemen) Taiz	2015	Closed due to Siege of Taiz
Tejgaon Airport	(Bangladesh) Dhaka	1981	Replaced with Hazrat Shahjalal International Airport in Kurmitola.
Temindung Airport	(Indonesia) Samarinda	24 May 2018	Replaced with Aji Pangeran Tumenggung Pranoto Airport in Sungai Siring.
Walton Airport	(Pakistan) Lahore	1962	Replaced with Allama Iqbal International Airport. Site redeveloped into CBD Punjab.
Wuhan Nanhu Airport	(China) Wuhan	15 April 1995	Replaced with Wuhan Tianhe International Airport.
Xi'an Xiguan Airport	(China) Xi'an	1 September 1991	Replaced with Xi'an Xianyang International Airport. Site redeveloped into a civil park.
Yantai Laishan Airport	(China) Yantai	28 May 2015 (civil)	Laishan was a joint military-civil aerodrome until 2015; in 2015 all commercial traffic was moved to the newly-built Yantai Penglai International Airport, while Laishan was reverted to sole military use.
Yasser Arafat International Airport	(Palestine) Gaza Strip	8 October 2000	The closest public airports in the area are the Ben Gurion Airport in Israel and the El Arish Airport in Egypt.
Yeouido Airport	(South Korea) Seoul	30 January 1958 (civil); February 1971 (military)	Yeouido was a joint military-civil aerodrome until 1958; in 1958 all commercial traffic was moved to the newly-renovated Gimpo International Airport. Military operations remained at Yeouido until 1971, when it was moved to the newly-built Seoul Air Base in Seongnam.
Zhanjiang Airport	(China) Zhanjiang	24 March 2022	Replaced with Zhanjiang Wuchuan International Airport.
Zhengzhou Dongjiao Airport	(China) Zhengzhou	28 August 1997	Replaced with Zhengzhou Xinzheng International Airport. Site redeveloped into Zhengdong New Area.

== Europe ==
Airport	City served	Date of closure	Notes
Atatürk Airport	(Turkey) Istanbul	6 April 2019 (passenger); 5 February 2022 (cargo)	Replaced with the new Istanbul Airport in Arnavutköy.
Bălți City Airport	(Moldova) Bălți	2010	Replaced with the new Bălți International Airport in Corlăteni, Rîșcani District, which opened in 1989.
Berck-sur-Mer	(France) Pas-de-Calais	Year unknown	
Berlin Schönefeld Airport	(Germany) Berlin	25 October 2020; November 2022 (as Berlin Brandenburg Airport Terminal 5)	Large parts of Schönefeld's infrastructure, including a runway, were incorporated into Berlin Brandenburg Airport; conversely, in Schönefeld's final years of operation, it utilized the new airport's infrastructure, such as the new southern runway and the air traffic control tower. Schönefeld's terminal briefly operated as Berlin Brandenburg Airport's Terminal 5.
Berlin Tegel Airport	(Germany) Berlin	8 November 2020	Replaced with Berlin Brandenburg Airport. Site redeveloped into Urban Tech Republic.
Berlin Tempelhof Airport	(Germany) Berlin	30 October 2008	Site redeveloped into Tempelhofer Feld.
Blackbushe Airport	(United Kingdom) Yateley	1958	Eclipsed since 1958 by the growth of Heathrow and Gatwick airports, Blackbushe was once a significant airport for passenger and cargo charter flights for the London area, but is now used for general aviation.
Blackpool Airport	(United Kingdom) Blackpool	15 October 2014	Blackpool is now used for general aviation.
Böblingen Airport	(Germany) Stuttgart	1939 (civil); 1993 (military)	Replaced with the new Stuttgart Airport in Leinfelden-Echterdingen and Filderstadt, which opened in 1948.
Bozhurishte Airport	(Bulgaria) Sofia	2005	Replaced with Sofia Airport.
Bristol Filton Airport	(United Kingdom) Bristol	31 December 2012	
Bristol (Whitchurch) Airport	(United Kingdom) Bristol	1 May 1957	Replaced with the new Bristol Airport in Lulsgate Bottom.
Brive–La Roche Airport	(France) Brive-la-Gaillarde	February 2011 (Passenger services, not final closure)	Replaced by Brive–Souillac Airport, Ryanair once served this airport.
Budaörs Airport	(Hungary) Budapest	7 May 1950	it was once Hungary's only international airport, Replaced by Budapest Ferenc Liszt International Airport, Budaörs is now an active general aviation airport.
Bykovo Airport	(Russia) Moscow	18 October 2010	Mostly demolished, the area turned into logistical center, the runaway is used for drag-racing.
Calais-Dunkerque Airport	(France) Calais	Year unknown	
Cologne Butzweilerhof Airport	(Germany) Cologne	31 December 1995	Replaced with Cologne Bonn Airport in Porz.
Coventry Airport	(United Kingdom) Coventry	9 November 2008 (Passenger)	Since October 2017, Coventry Airport has been undergoing transition to a general aviation aerodrome offering a flight information service.
Croydon Airport	(United Kingdom) London	1959	Replaced with Heathrow Airport in Hillingdon. The airport's former terminal building and a de Havilland Heron still exists today.
Derby Airport	(United Kingdom) Derby	1990	Replaced with East Midlands Airport in Castle Donington.
Doncaster Sheffield Airport	(United Kingdom) Finningley	4 November 2022 (Passenger)	
Donetsk International Airport	(Ukraine) Donetsk	26 May 2014	Destroyed by the first and second battles.
Dnipro International Airport	(Ukraine) Dnipro	15 March 2022	Destroyed during the 2022 Dnipro missile strikes, as part of the 2022 Russian invasion of Ukraine.
Ellinikon International Airport	(Greece) Athens	28 March 2001	Replaced with the new Athens International Airport in Spata. Site redeveloped into Hellenikon Metropolitan Park.
Frankfurt-Rebstock Airfield	(Germany) Frankfurt	27 March 1945	Replaced with the new Frankfurt Airport, which opened on 8 July 1936.
Galway Airport	(Republic of Ireland) Galway	31 October 2011	
Gressholmen Airport	(Norway) Oslo	1939 (civil); 1946 (military)	Gressholmen was a joint military-civil water aerodrome until 1939; in 1939 all commercial traffic was moved to Fornebu Airport. Military operations remained at Gressholmen until 1946, when it was converted into a marina.
Haren Airport	(Belgium) Brussels	1950s	Replaced with Brussels Airport in Zaventem.
Havryshivka Vinnytsia International Airport	(Ukraine) Vinnytsia	6 March 2022	Destroyed during the 2022 Vinnytsia attacks, as part of the 2022 Russian invasion of Ukraine.
Helsinki-Malmi Airport	(Finland) Helsinki	14 March 2021	
Heston Aerodrome	(United Kingdom) London	1947	One of the major airports in london at the time
Ipswich Airport	(United Kingdom) Ipswich	January 1998	
Izmail International Airport	(Ukraine) Izmail	2010	was closed and has not renewed its certification with the State Aviation Administration of Ukraine since being suspended for three years in 2010, Carpatair Once served this airport
Katajanokka Airport	(Finland) Helsinki	16 December 1936	Replaced with Helsinki-Malmi Airport.
Katowice-Muchowiec Airport	(Poland) Katowice	Year unknown	
Kherson International Airport	(Ukraine) Kherson, Mykolaiv	24 February 2022	Damaged on 2022 Chornobaivka attacks
Khodynka Aerodrome	(Russia) Moscow	2003	Starting from 1950s until the aerodrome's closure, it only handled shipping for new Ilyushin aircraft. The airport's metro station, Aeroport, still exists today.
Kraków-Rakowice-Czyżyny Airport	(Poland) Kraków	1964	Replaced with the new Kraków John Paul II International Airport in Balice. Converted into the Polish Aviation Museum.
Kryvyi Rih International Airport	(Ukraine) Kryvyi Rih	8 October 2021(?)	The airport has been shelled during the Russian invasion of Ukraine as part of the Bombing of Kryvyi Rih. On Monday, September 26, the Russians attacked Kryvyi Rih with a X-59 missile. As a result of the missile strike, the infrastructure of the airport was damaged.
La Palma Airport Buenavista de Arriba	(Spain) Santa Cruz de la Palma	14 April 1970	Relocated farther South close to sea level due to dangerous wind and weather conditions at the old site at an elevation of 350m MSL.
Luhansk International Airport	(Ukraine) Luhansk	11 June 2014	Destroyed during the war in Donbas.
Lympne Airport	(United Kingdom) Lympne	1984	
Lyon–Bron Airport	(France) Lyon	12 April 1975	Replaced with Lyon–Saint-Exupéry Airport. Still open today for general aviation.
Malmö Bulltofta Airport	(Sweden) Malmö	2 December 1972	Replaced with the new Malmö Airport in Svedala. Site redeveloped into Bulltoftaparken.
Manchester (Wythenshawe) Aerodrome	(United Kingdom) Manchester	1930	Replaced with the new Manchester Barton Aerodrome in Barton upon Irwell.
Manston Airport	(United Kingdom) Ramsgate	15 May 2014	
Minsk-1 Airport	(Belarus) Minsk	23 December 2015	Replaced with Minsk National Airport, which opened on 1 July 1983.
Moss Airport, Rygge	(Norway) Moss	1 November 2016 (Civil services ended)	
Munich-Riem Airport	(Germany) Munich	16 May 1992	Replaced with the new Munich Airport in Erding and Freising. Site redeveloped into Messestadt Riem.
Murcia–San Javier Airport	(Spain) Region of Murcia	14 January 2019 (civil)	Currently operating as an Airbase, was mostly used by leisure and low-cost carriers such as Jet2.com and Ryanair.
Northolt Airport	(United Kingdom) London	1954	Commissioned as RAF Northolt. Replaced with Heathrow Airport.
Nutts Corner	(United Kingdom) Belfast	1963	Replaced with Belfast International Airport in Aldergrove.
Oslo Airport, Fornebu	(Norway) Oslo	7 October 1998	Replaced with Gardermoen Airport. Site redeveloped into an information technology and telecommunications centre, including the headquarters of Telenor.
Palermo–Boccadifalco Airport	(Italy) Palermo	1 January 2009 (Passenger services)	It was Palermo's main airport and the third busiest in Italy, replaced by Palermo International Airport, today the airport is used by one of the local Aeroclub and for general aviation.
Paris–Le Bourget Airport	(France) Paris	1977	All commercial airline traffic was relocated to Orly Airport and Charles de Gaulle Airport. Still open today for general aviation, including business jet operations. It also hosts air shows, most notably the Paris Air Show (which was first held at Le Bourget in 1953).
Pipera Airport	(Romania) Bucharest	1958	
Plymouth City Airport	(United Kingdom) Plymouth	23 December 2011	
Poti International Airport	(Georgia (country)) / (Soviet Union) Poti	1990s	It has been closed since the collapse of the USSR
Prague–Kbely Airport	(Czech Republic) Prague	5 April 1937	Kbely Airport was built in 1918 and was Prague's only airport until the construction of Ruzyně Airport, now its a military Airport.
Renfrew Airport	(United Kingdom) Glasgow	2 May 1966	Replaced with the new Glasgow Airport in Abbotsinch.
Rhodes Maritsa Airport	(Greece) Rhodes	1977	Commissioned as military airbase. Replaced with the new Rhodes International Airport in Paradeisi.
Rome Urbe Airport	(Italy) Rome	Year unknown	
Rostov-on-Don Airport	(Russia) Rostov-on-Don	1 March 2018	Replaced with Platov International Airport, which opened on 27 November 2017.
Saratov Central Airport	(Russia) Saratov	20 August 2019	Pegas Fly once had a flight to Antalya Airport
Säve Airport	(Sweden) Gothenburg	18 January 2015	Replaced with Göteborg Landvetter Airport.
Sevastopol International Airport	(Ukraine) / (Russia) Sevastopol	2007 (Civil)	following the start of the Russo-Ukrainian War and the annexation of Crimea by the Russian Federation, the base has been operated by the Russian Ministry of Defence.
Sheffield City Airport	(United Kingdom) Sheffield	30 April 2008	The last scheduled airline pulled out of Sheffield City in 2002. Replaced with Doncaster Sheffield Airport, which opened on 28 April 2005.
Sligo Airport	(Republic of Ireland) Sligo	21 July 2011	
Słupsk-Redzikowo Airport	(Poland) Słupsk	2016	
Son Bonet Aerodrome	(Spain) Palma de Mallorca	1959	Replaced with Palma de Mallorca Airport. Still open today for general aviation.
Spilve Airport	(Latvia) Riga	1986	Replaced with the new Riga International Airport in Mārupe.
Stanley Park Aerodrome	(United Kingdom) Blackpool	1947	Some flights were available to Dublin
Stavanger Airport, Forus	(Norway) Stavanger	1989	
Tatoi Airport	(Greece) Athens	19?? (Passenger services)	Athens first airport, now only used for military and aeroclubs
Torslanda Airport	(Sweden) Gothenburg	3 October 1977	Replaced with Göteborg Landvetter Airport.
Toulouse-Montaudran Airport	(France) Toulouse	18 December 2003	Replaced with Toulouse–Blagnac Airport.
Tushino Airfield	(Russia) Moscow	1991	
Sukhumi Babushara Airport	(Georgia (country)) / (Abkhazia) Sukhumi	1990s (?)	The airport was heavily damaged during the Georgian Civil War, the airport formerly classified as an international airport
Vajnory Airport	(Slovakia) Bratislava	1951 (passenger); January 2007 (general aviation)	Replaced with Milan Rastislav Štefánik Airport in Ivanka pri Dunaji. Used by the local flying club until Vajnory was officially closed in January 2007.
Vicenza Airport	(Italy) Vicenza	2008	VoliRegionali S.p.A. ("Regional Flights" SpA) was an airline based at Vicenza Airport, VoliRegionali began service on 30 May 2005 with a demonstration flight to Olbia, Forlì, and Munich making it an international airport
Waalhaven	(Netherlands) Rotterdam	October 1956	Replaced with Rotterdam The Hague Airport in Zestienhoven.
Wien-Aspern Airport	(Austria) Vienna	30 April 1977	Replaced with Vienna International Airport in Schwechat. Site redeveloped into Seestadt Aspern.
Wrzeszcz	(Poland) Gdańsk	1974	

== North America ==
Airport	City served	Date of closure	Notes
Barbuda Codrington Airport	(Antigua and Barbuda) Codrington	2 October 2024	The airport closed permanently in the evening of 2 October 2024. It was replaced by Burton–Nibbs International Airport the following morning, Some charter flights were available to Saint Barthélemy and Anguilla
Bowman Field	(United States) Louisville, Kentucky	1947 (passenger services)	Replaced by Louisville International Airport, now a general aviation airport and used for flight schools.
Capital City Airport	(United States) Harrisburg, Pennsylvania	1968 (passenger services)	Replaced by Harrisburg International Airport, now a general aviation airport.
Cayo Coco Airport	(Cuba) Cayo Coco	2002	Replaced by Jardines del Rey Airport
Charles B. Wheeler Downtown Airport	(United States) Kansas City, Missouri	1972 (passenger services)	Replaced by Kansas City International Airport, now a general aviation reliever airport.
Ciudad Libertad Airport	(Cuba) Havana	1930	it was Cuba's main airport until 1930, when it was replaced by José Martí International Airport.
Coleman A. Young International Airport	(United States) Detroit	18 September 2000 (passenger services)	Currently used for general aviation
Edmonton City Centre Airport	(Canada) Edmonton	November 30, 2013	In 1950, the airport was a stop on an international route operated by Northwest Airlines between the United States and Asia. In the 70s and 80s it was a hub for short-haul regional travel. The site is currently being reclaimed for high density residential housing.
E.T. Joshua Airport	(Saint Vincent and the Grenadines) Kingstown	14 February 2017	St. Vincent's main and only airport in the 1960s, replaced by Argyle International Airport.
Greater Southwest International Airport	(United States) Fort Worth, Texas	1974	Replaced by Dallas Fort Worth International Airport
Herrera International Airport	(Dominican Republic) Santo Domingo	February 23, 2006	Replaced by La Isabela International Airport,
Henderson Hillsborough International Airport	(United States) Tampa, Florida	1950s	Previously as Hillsborough Army Airfield, After World War II, Hillsborough was reused as a civilian airport, however it was closed in the late 1950s.
Houlton International Airport	(United States) Houlton, Maine	Unknown (passenger services)	It once had scheduled airline service on Northeast Airlines, now it's only for general aviation.
Ilopango International Airport	(El Salvador) San Salvador	1980 (passenger services)	Replaced by Comalapa International Airport, Ilopango is now serving as a general aviation airport.
Jacksonville Imeson Airport	(United States) Jacksonville, Florida	1968	Replaced by Jacksonville International Airport.
Ing. Fernando Espinoza Gutiérrez International Airport	(Mexico) Querétaro	2004	Replaced by Querétaro International Airport
International Pan American Airport	(United States) Miami, Florida	1945	It was one of the world's largest airports and the main hub for air traffic between North and South America.
Marquette County Airport	(United States) Marquette, Michigan	1999	Replaced by Sawyer International Airport
Montréal–Mirabel International Airport	(Canada) Greater Montreal	October 31, 2004 (passenger services)	used for daily flights transporting employees for various mining companies by the Nolinor airline company and for some International Cargo Deliveries.
Old Kona Airport	(United States) ( (Hawaii) ) Kailua Kona	1970	Replaced by Kona International Airport
Panama City–Bay County International Airport	(United States) Panama City, Florida	October 1, 2010	Replaced by Northwest Florida Beaches International Airport.
Pearls Airport	(Grenada) Grenville	1984	It was the country's first airport, replaced by Maurice Bishop International Airport.
Robert Mueller Municipal Airport	(United States) Greater Austin	June 22, 1999	Replaced by the new Austin-Bergstrom International Airport.
Santiago Municipal Airport	(Dominican Republic) Santiago de los Caballeros	2002	On March 18, 2002, the two American Eagle flights to San Juan were transferred to the new Cibao International Airport, ceasing passenger operations in Santiago Municipal Airport. A Year later the Santiago Air Base became unnecessary for the FAD, and a cost that they could not handle by themselves, so they moved all operations to the Puerto Plata Air Base (located in Gregorio Luperon International Airport). Santiago Municipal was now completely closed, with no operations at all.
Sloulin Field International Airport	(United States) Williston, North Dakota	October 10, 2019	Officials decided to build Williston Basin International Airport. Sloulin Field Airport closed to the public on October 10, 2019.
Stapleton International Airport	(United States) Denver metropolitan area	February 27, 1995	Replaced by Denver International Airport
W. H. Bramble Airport	Montserrat	25 June 1997	The airport was abandoned on 25 June 1997 due to approaching negative effects of the eruption of the nearby Soufrière Hills volcano, which obliterated much of the southern part of the island.

== Oceania ==
Airport	City served	Date of closure	Notes
Canton Island Airport	(Kiribati) Canton Island	1976 (Every Commercial services)	Once a major stop on commercial trans-Pacific airline routes, today the airport is available for emergency use only, although after closure, Air Tungaru used it as an occasional refuelling stop on its Tarawa-Kiritimati-Honolulu route well into the 1990s until the airline closes down
Daly Waters Airfield	(Australia) Daly Waters	1970	
Eagle Farm Airport	(Australia) Brisbane	19 March 1988	Eagle Farm Airport was expanded into the former neighbouring suburb of Cribb Island to become Brisbane Airport, with some of Eagle Farm's infrastructure were incorporated into today's Brisbane Airport.
Essendon Fields Airport	(Australia) Melbourne	1 July 1970	Replaced with Melbourne Airport in Tullamarine. Still open today for general aviation.
Fagaliʻi Airport	(Samoa) Fagaliʻi	31 December 2019	All flights were transferred to Faleolo International Airport, there once an international flights to Pago Pago, American Samoa.
Lae Airfield	(Papua New Guinea) Lae	1987 (Civil) 1992 (Final)	Some major Australian airlines served this airport, replaced by Lae Nadzab Airport
Rabaul old Airport	(Papua New Guinea) Rabaul	1994 (destroyed)	The airport was destroyed by the 1994 eruption that destroyed the town of Rabaul and subsequently a new airport was built and opened at Tokua, on the opposite side of the Rabaul caldera. The former airport was located at 04°13′S 152°11′E, Ansett Australia once served this Airport
Mount Iron Aerodrome	(New Zealand) Wānaka	1986	Replaced with Wānaka Airport in Luggate.
Parafield Airport	(Australia) Adelaide	February 1955 (Passenger services)	Parafield was Adelaide's only civil airport until Adelaide Airport was opened, currently used for small aircraft, pilot training and recreational aviation.

== South America ==
Airport	City served	Date of closure	Notes
Augusto Severo International Airport	(Brazil) Natal	31 May 2014	Commissioned as Natal Air Force Base. Replaced with Greater Natal International Airport.
Bartolomeu de Gusmão Airport	(Brazil) Rio de Janeiro	12 February 1942	Commissioned as Santa Cruz Air Force Base.
Caiari Airport	(Brazil) Porto Velho	16 April 1969	Replaced with Governador Jorge Teixeira de Oliveira International Airport.
Campo de Marte Airport	(Brazil) São Paulo	1936	Replaced by Congonhas-São Paulo Airport, Now its the base for São Paulo Air Force Base, and also available for Flying club, helicopters and general aviation services.
Carlos Drummond de Andrade Airport	(Brazil) Belo Horizonte	March 1984 (for passenger services)	Possibly replaced by Belo Horizonte International Airport, military services probably still exists, the airport is possibly still active but no scheduled flights are available
El Trompillo Airport	(Bolivia) Santa Cruz de la Sierra	2019	Commissioned as a military aerodrome. Replaced with Viru Viru International Airport, which opened in 1983.
General Manuel Serrano Airport	(Ecuador) Machala	2009	Replaced by Santa Rosa International Airport
Gómez Niño Airport	(Colombia) Bucaramanga	August 1974	Replaced with Palonegro International Airport.
Grano de Oro International Airport	(Venezuela) Maracaibo	16 November 1969	Replaced with La Chinita International Airport.
Juana Azurduy de Padilla International Airport	(Bolivia) Sucre	15 May 2016	Commissioned as a military aerodrome. Replaced with Alcantarí Airport.
Limatambo International Airport	(Peru) Lima	29 October 1960	Replaced with Jorge Chávez International Airport in Callao.
Lago Argentino Airport	(Argentina) El Calafate	2006	Replaced by Comandante Armando Tola International Airport
Lieutenant Bergerie airport	(Peru) Iquitos	Unknown (Civil)	Replaced by Coronel FAP Francisco Secada Vignetta International Airport, now operating as a military airport
Los Cerrillos Airport	Santiago de Chile	9 February 1967 (civil); 8 February 2006 (general)	Replaced with Arturo Merino Benítez International Airport in Pudahuel.
Morón Airport	(Argentina) Morón	1944? (Passenger services)	Replaced by Ministro Pistarini International Airport, it was then the home of the Argentine Air Force from 1951 to 1988; there is also a flying school operated by the Aero Club Argentino
SCADTA Muzú International Airport	(Colombia) Bogotá	1924	Replaced with SCADTA Vergel International Airport in Puente Aranda.
Old Luisa Caceres de Arismendi National Airport	(Venezuela) Porlamar	Year unknown	
Old Mariscal Sucre International Airport in Chaupicruz	(Ecuador) Quito	19 February 2013	Replaced with the new Mariscal Sucre International Airport in Tababela.
Ponta Pelada Airport	(Brazil) Manaus	31 March 1976	Commissioned as Manaus Air Force Base. Replaced with Eduardo Gomes International Airport.
Presidente Médici International Airport	(Brazil) Rio Branco	22 November 1999	Replaced with Plácido de Castro International Airport.
Lansa Santa Cecilia International Airport	(Colombia) Bogotá	1954	Replaced with Avianca Techo International Airport in Kennedy City.
Santarém old Airport	(Brazil)	1977~	Replaced by Santarém–Maestro Wilson Fonseca International Airport
Soledad International Airport	(Colombia) Barranquilla	7 April 1981	Replaced with Ernesto Cortissoz International Airport.
Avianca Techo International Airport	(Colombia) Bogotá	10 December 1959	Replaced with El Dorado International Airport in Fontibón.
Ushuaia Old International Airport	(Argentina) Ushuaia	1995 (Passenger)	The Aeroclub previously served as Ushuaia's international airport before the opening of Ushuaia – Malvinas Argentinas International Airport in 1995
SCADTA Vergel International Airport	(Colombia) Bogotá	1928	Replaced with Avianca Techo International Airport in Kennedy City.

== See also ==
- List of cities with more than one commercial airport
- List of Defunct Flag Carrier Airlines
