= Aerolíneas Argentinas Flight 648 =

Aerolíneas Argentinas Flight 648 may refer to:

- Aerolíneas Argentinas Flight 648 (1966), a flight was hijacked while en route from Buenos Aires to Río Gallegos
- Aerolíneas Argentinas Flight 648 (1988), a flight was involved in an accident at the Ushuaia Aeroclub

== See also ==
- Flight 648
