= Colombian Aerospace Museum =

- Museo Aeroespacial Colombiano
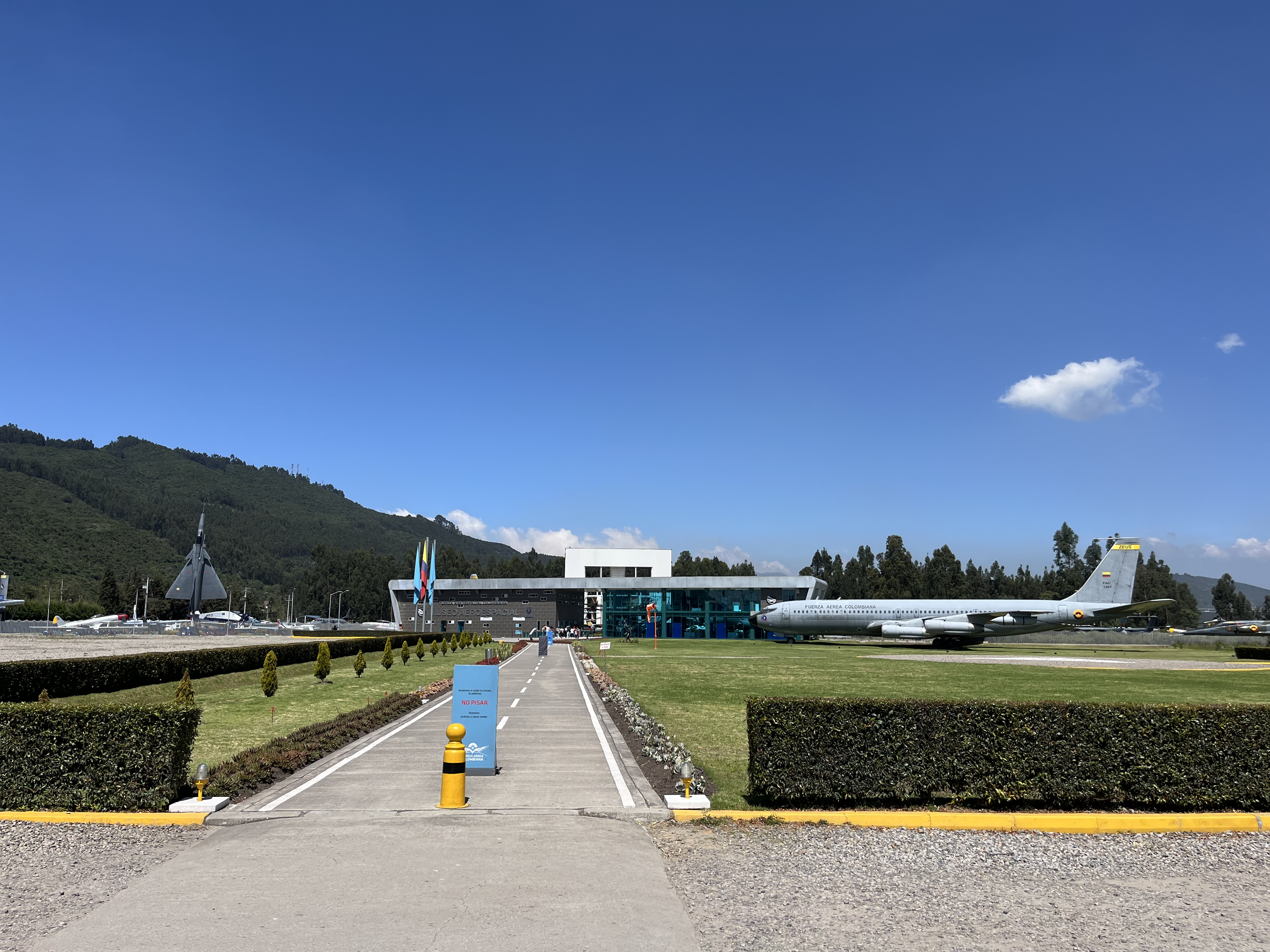
- Entrance to the museum in 2025.

- Location within Colombia
- Established: 1968
- Location: Tocancipá, Cundinamarca
- Coordinates: 4.950°N 73.961°W
- Type: Aviation museum
- Website: www.museofac.mil.co/museo-aeroespacial-colombiano-0

The Colombian Aerospace Museum is an aerospace museum located near Tocancipá, Cundinamarca.

== History ==
Founded in 1968, the museum was originally located at Techo International Airport. In 1972 it was moved to the Military Transport Air Command at El Dorado International Airport. In 1999, the museum took over the newly refurbished Military Transport Air Command offices and opened to the public in April 2001. The museum moved again to a location across from Jaime Duque Park, where it opened in November 2017.

== Collection ==
- Beechcraft T-34 Mentor
- Bell UH-1B Iroquois
- Boeing 707
- Cessna A-37B Dragonfly
- Dassault Mirage 5COAM
- Douglas A-26 Invader
- Douglas C-54 Skymaster
- Gavilán G358
- Junkers Ju 52/3m
- Junkers W 34
- Lockheed C-60A Lodestar
- Lockheed C-130 Hercules
- Lockheed F-80 Shooting Star
- Lockheed T-33
- North American T-6 Texan
- Republic P-47 Thunderbolt

== See also ==
- List of aerospace museums
