= Jaime Duque Park =

Amusement park in Colombia

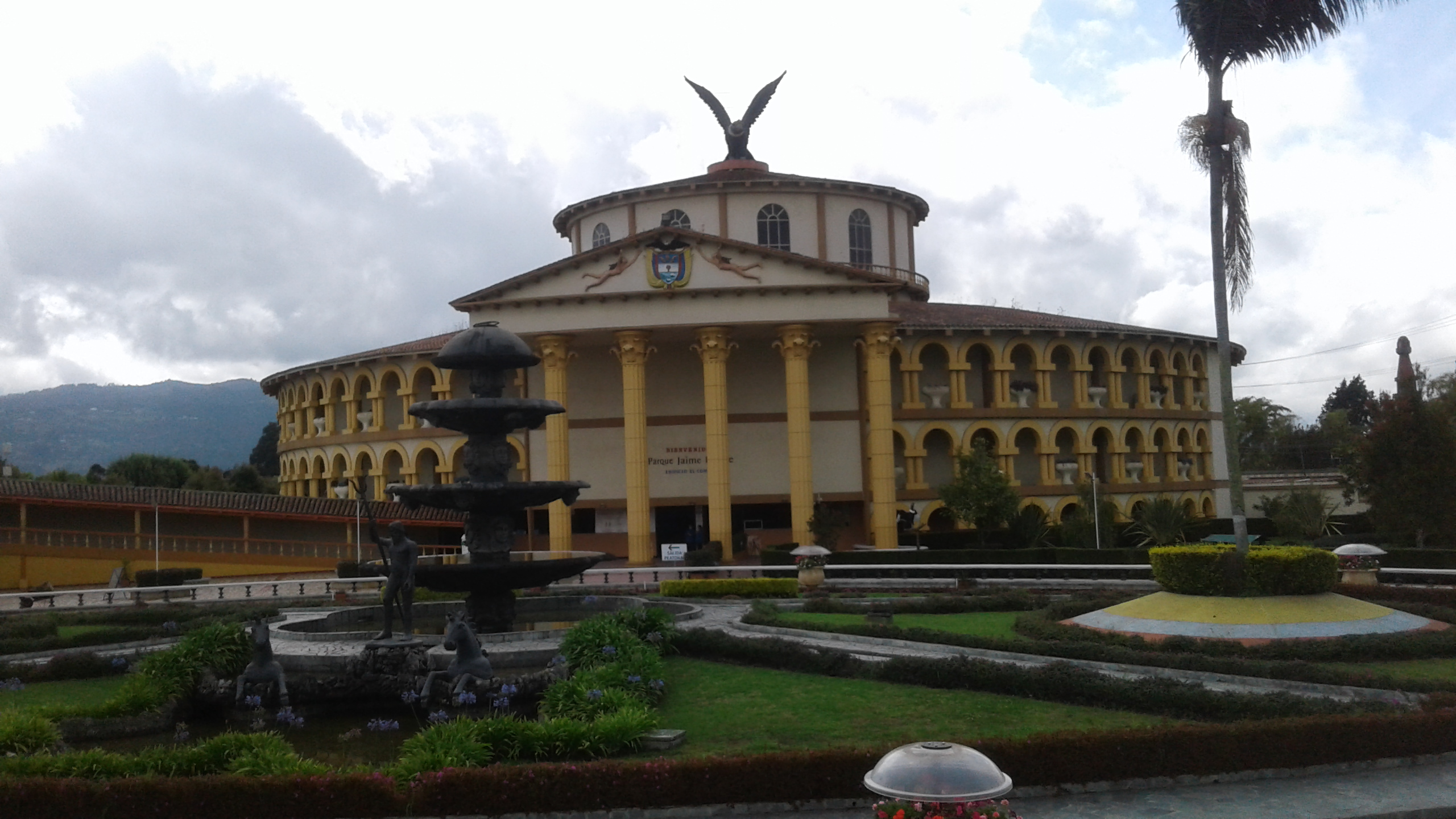
- El Cóndor building, access to the Park
- Interactive map of Jaime Duque Park
- Location: Tocancipá, Colombia
- Coordinates: 4.9477°N 73.9631°W
- Status: Operating
- Opened: February 27, 1983
- Website: www.parquejaimeduque.com

Jaime Duque Park is a family-oriented amusement park located in the Tocancipá municipality of the Metropolitan Area of Bogotá, Colombia. The park contains the Jaime Duque Zoo, the Museum of Mankind, as well as replicas of several major locations and buildings from around the world. A monorail runs through the park to help get guests from one area to another. The monorail has been recently upgraded as a panoramic train.

The park also has an outdoor stage for live performances. Here, the park has hosted performances by musicians such as Kylie Minogue, Guns N' Roses, Jamiroquai, The Killers, David Guetta, Paulina Rubio and Evanescence.

== History ==
The park first opened on February 27, 1983 and was founded by Jaime Duque Grisales (1917 - 2007), a personality of Colombian civil aviation and the first Colombian head of the Avianca airline pilots. He wanted to create a cultural and recreational space for the whole family, with the aim of generating profits to help institutions serving families.

== Attractions ==
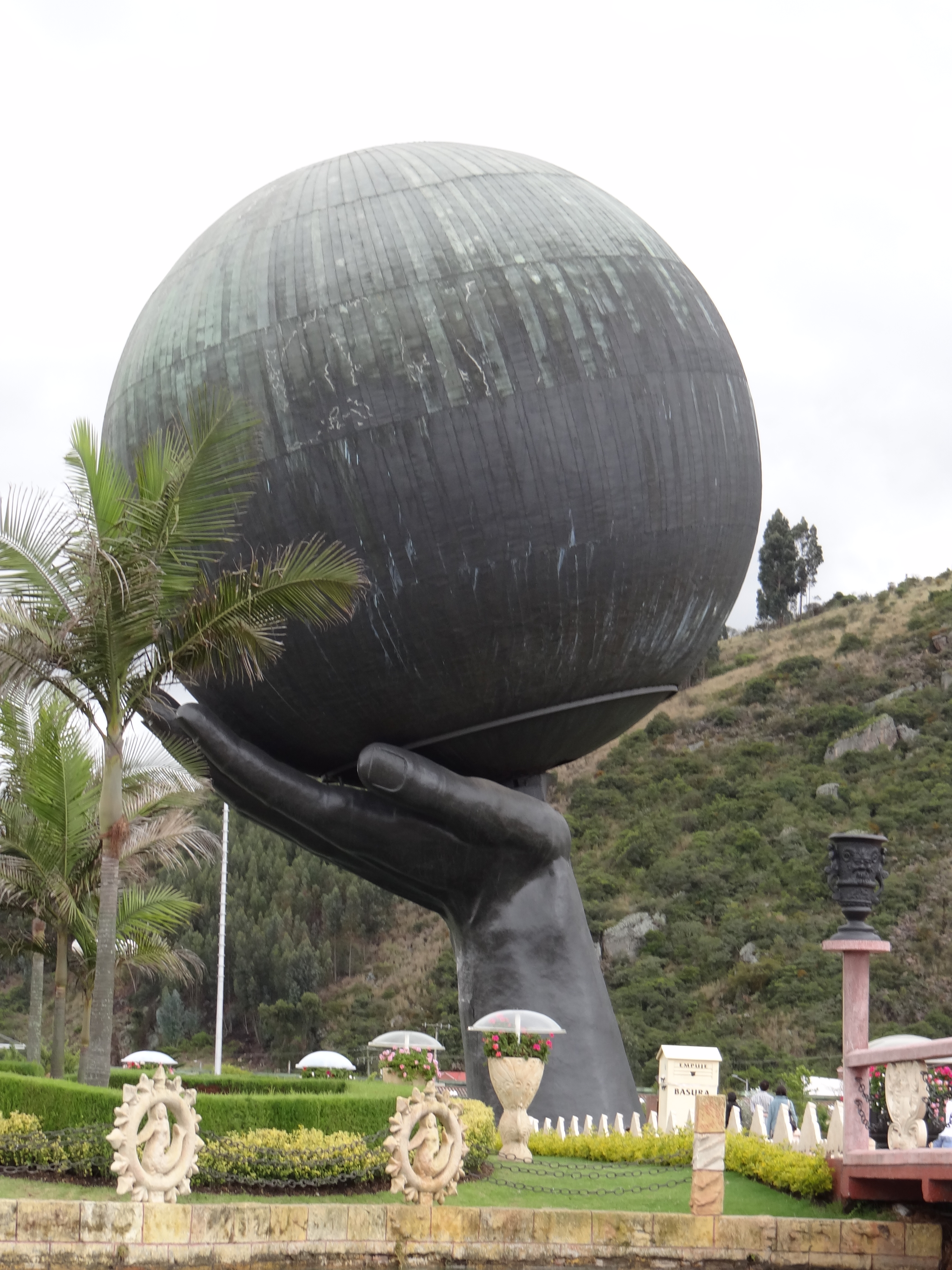
Hand of God monument

=== Maps and replicas ===
The park contains replicas of the Taj Mahal in India, as well as replicas of the Seven Wonders of the Ancient World. It also has several monuments, including a large hand holding a globe, which is the emblem of the park, meant to represent the hand of God. Inside the replica of Taj Mahal, there are reproductions painted in ceramic of great works of world art and the Cyclorama of Colombian Independence (in Spanish: Ciclorama de la Independencia Colombiana), a 165-meter-long and 7-meter-high mural that represents the entire process of that country's independence since the Revolution of the Comuneros in 1781, the Cry of Independence and the Battles of the Vargas Swamp and the Boyacá Bridge in 1819.

There is a relief map of Colombia on a scale of 1:25000, complemented with an aviary. There is also a map of the Caribbean Sea in which ARC Córdoba, a ship that was used during World War II, and a replica of the Independiente brig, a ship used by the National Navy during the war of Independence, are on display. Inside the replica of the Independiente brig, there are dioramas with representations of the most important naval battles that Colombia has fought throughout its history.

=== Zoo ===
The park's zoo contains several birds and monkeys as well as species native to South America, such as the capybara. It has specimens of about 200 species.

=== Wakatá Bio-Park ===
This park was inaugurated in 1991. It is managed by Jaime Duque Park under technical and professional supervision from La Salle University. Wakatá is a unit dedicated to conservation activities and environmental education. It trains students from different professions in the study and management of wild species and serves to support environment by providing a foster home for animals that have been confiscated by authorities.

=== Other attractions ===
- The World's Costumes Exhibition.
- The fantasy of a thousand and one nights. Tales Ali Baba and the 40 thieves and Cinderella.
- Dante's Castle with scenes from the Divine Comedy, a classic work of world literature written by Dante Alighieri, in a journey through scenes that represent Virgil's passage through the circles of hell.
- Low impact family rides.
- The Panoramic Train, which takes a panoramic tour through the park and the zoo.
- The museum of man in the universe. In 113 settings, the most important moments in the history of man and the universe from its origin to the conquest of the moon are presented through paintings and sculptures in a guided tour, divided into two stages with an average duration of 40 minutes.
- The Colombian Aerospace Museum

== Gallery ==
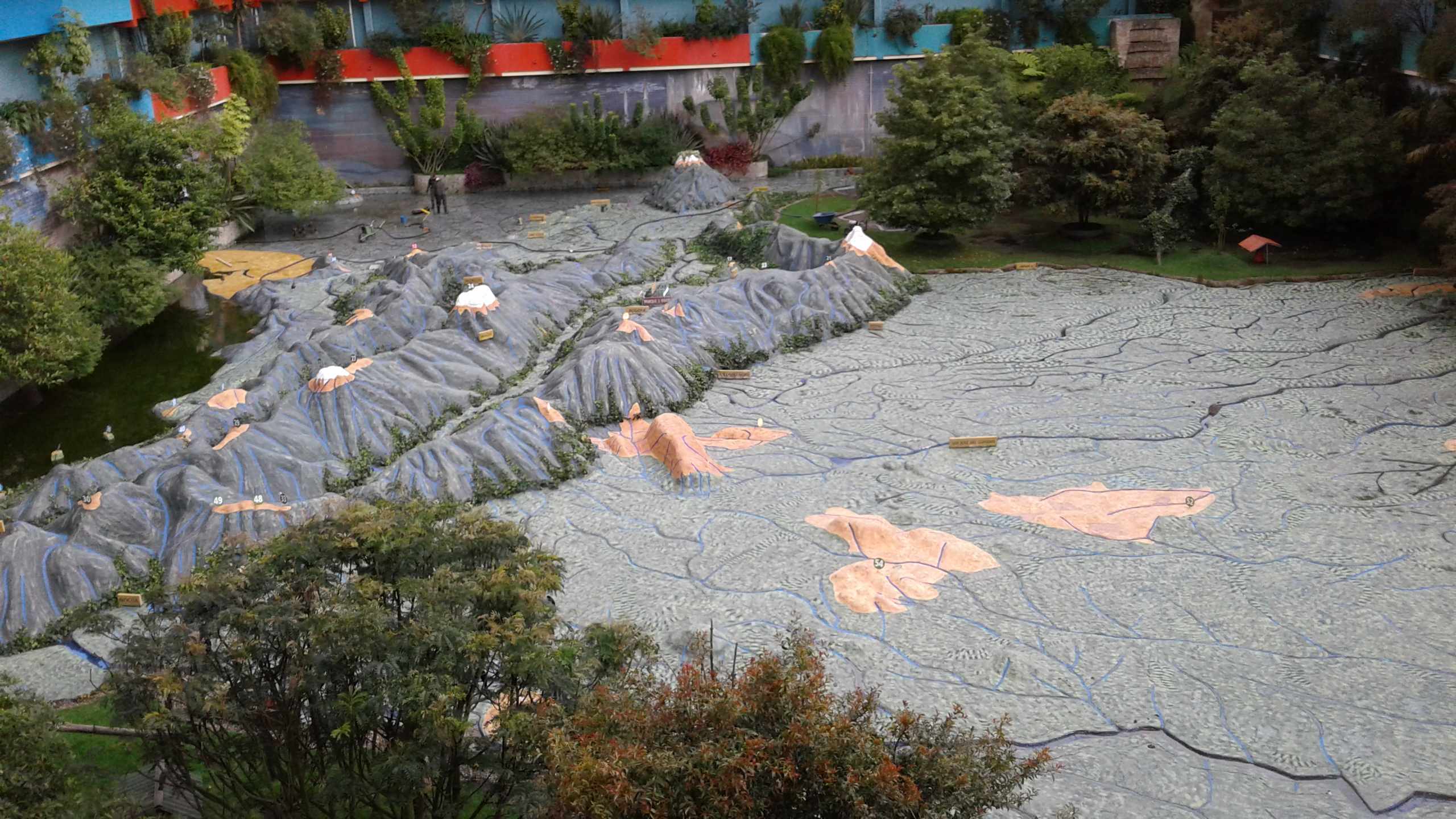
map of Colombia in relief

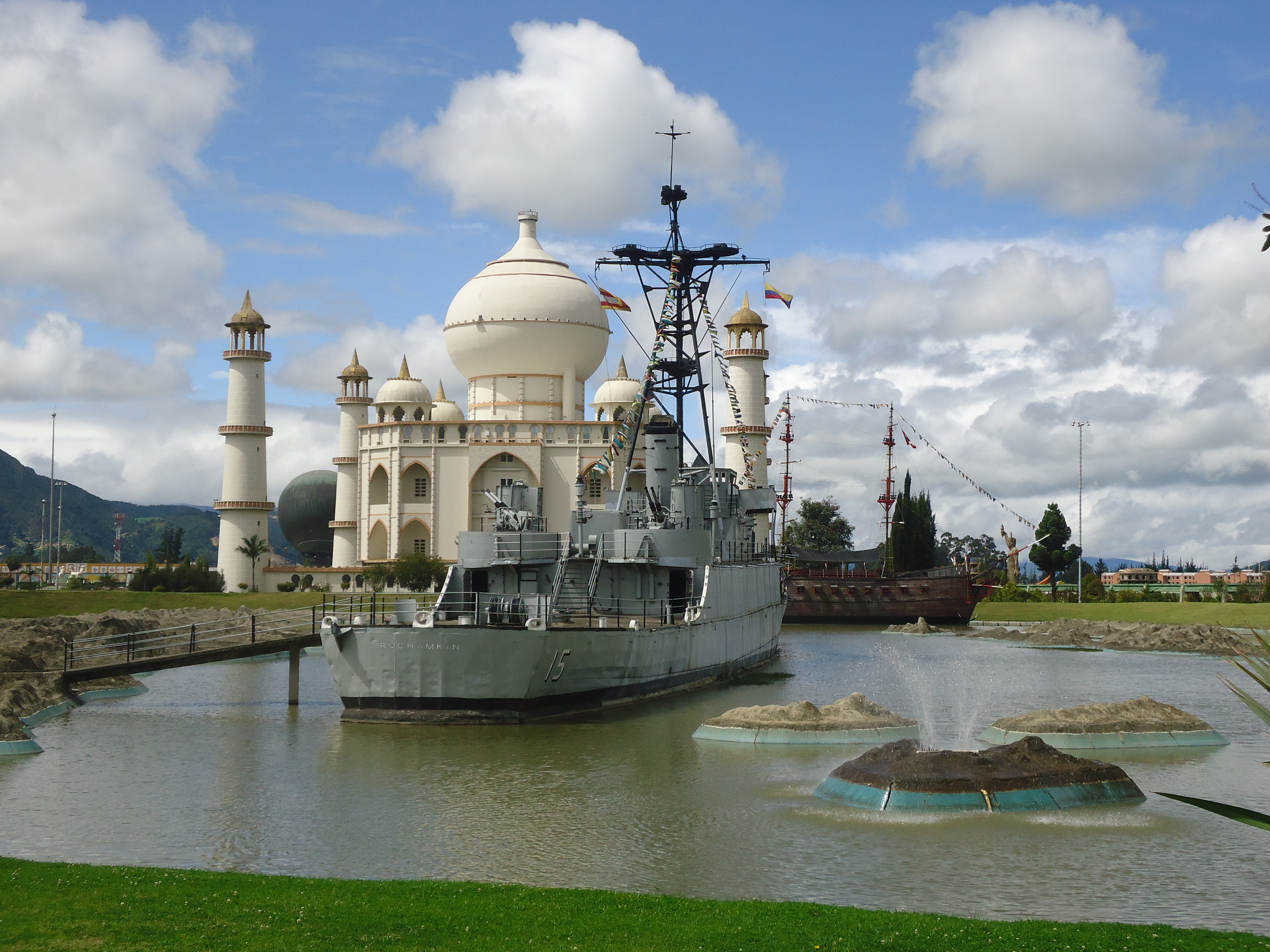
Caribbean Sea, with the replica of Taj Mahal in the background

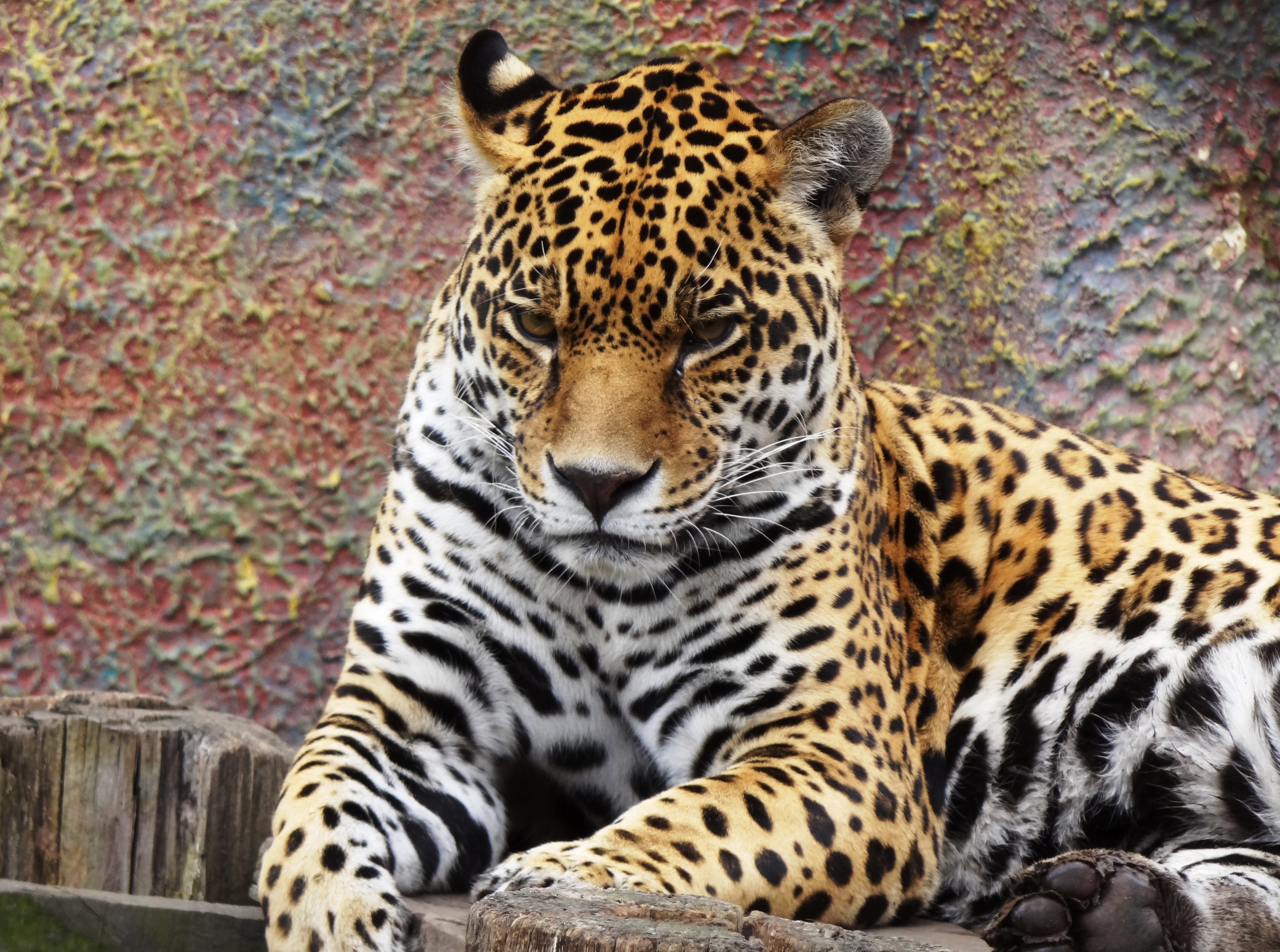
A Jaguar at the zoo

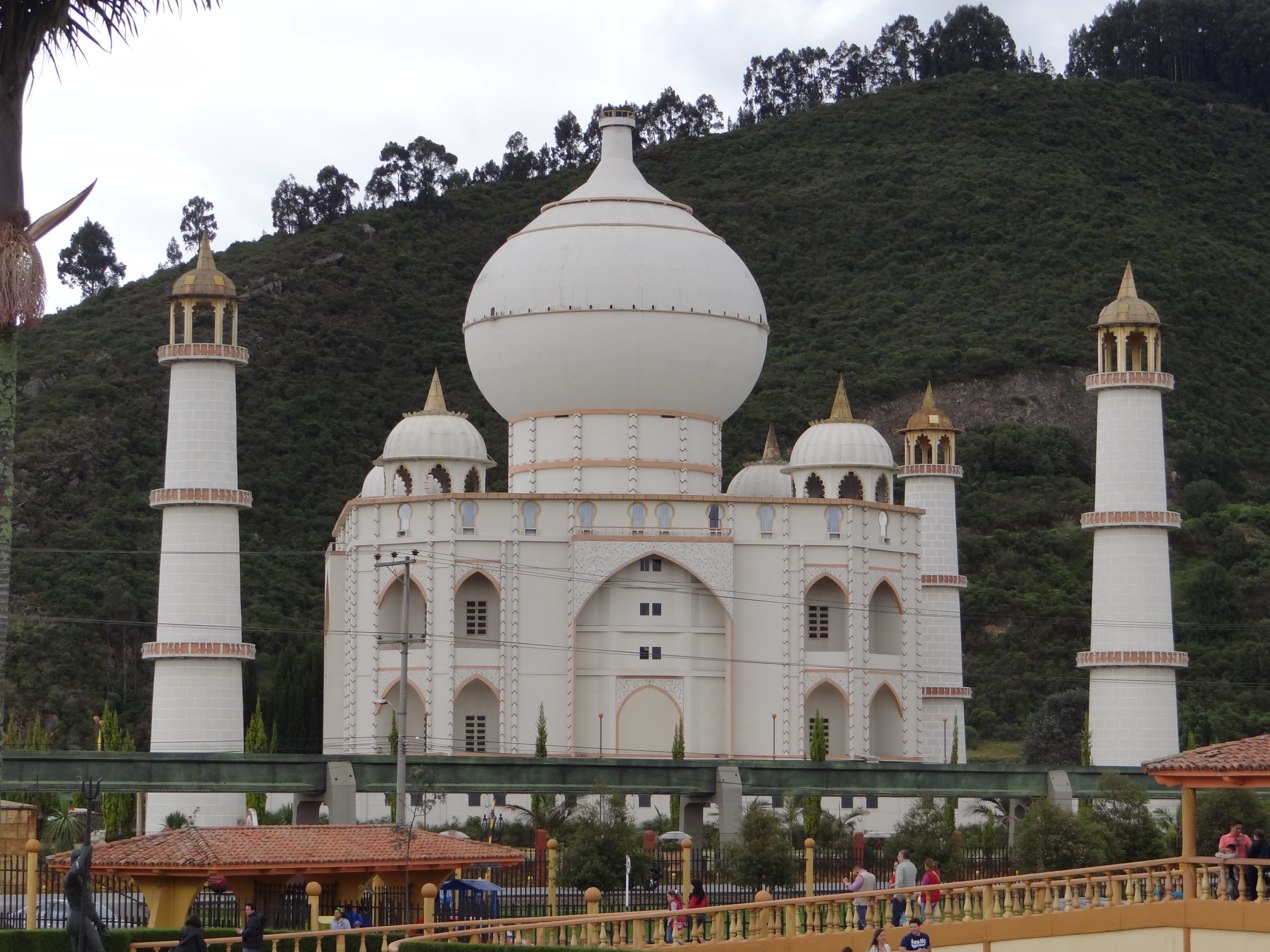
Replica of Taj Mahal

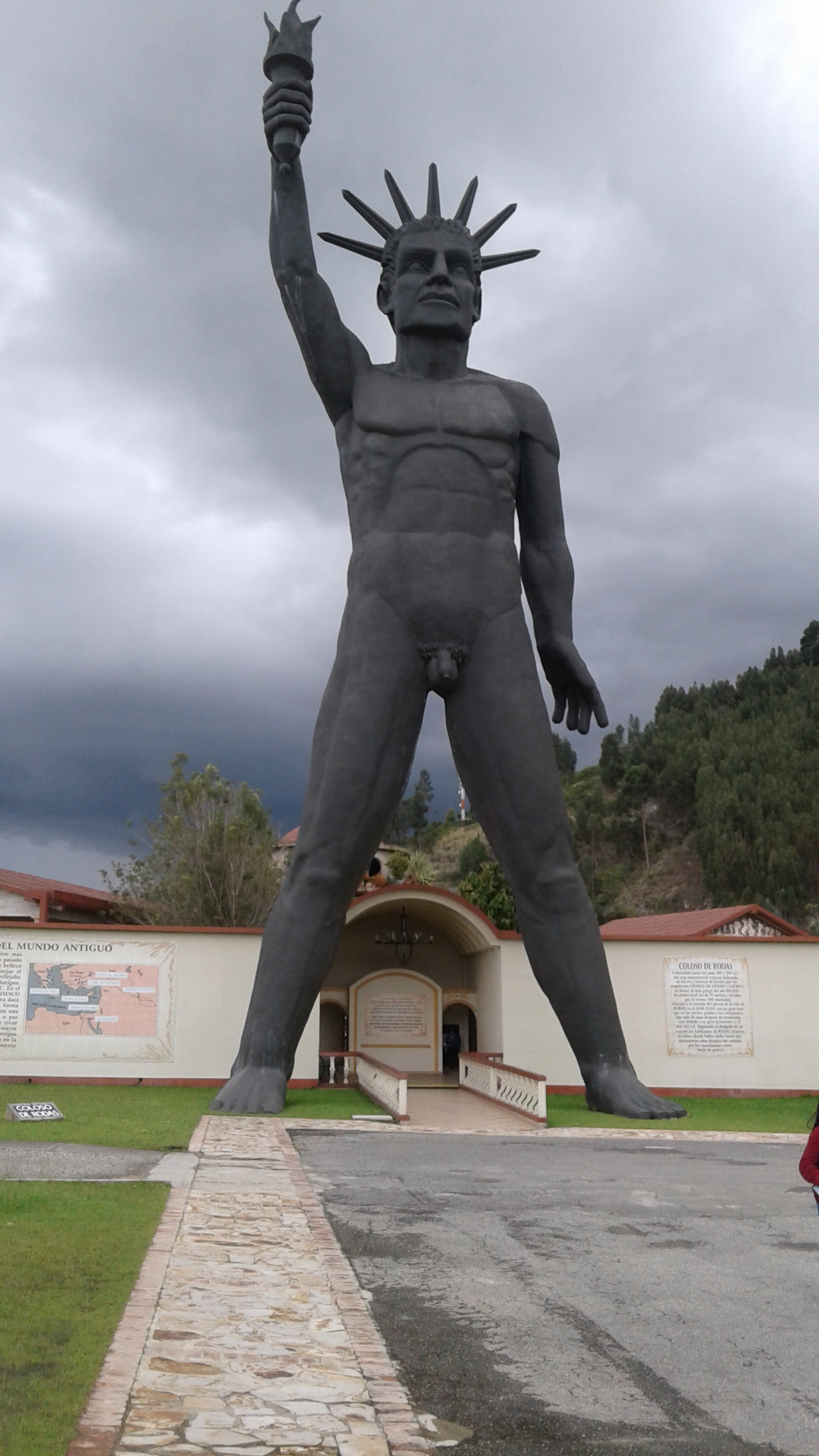
Replica of the Colossus of Rhodes, which is the entrance to the exhibition of the Seven Wonders of the Ancient World

== See also ==
- Tourism in Colombia
