= Flight 648 =

Flight 648 may refer to:

- Aerolíneas Argentinas Flight 648 (1966), a flight that was hijacked while en route from Buenos Aires to Río Gallegos
- Aerolíneas Argentinas Flight 648 (1988), a flight that was involved in an accident at the Ushuaia Aeroclub
- EgyptAir Flight 648, hijacked on 23 November 1985
