= Katajanokka Airport =

Former airport in Helsinki, Finland

Katajanokka Airport Katajanokan lentosatama
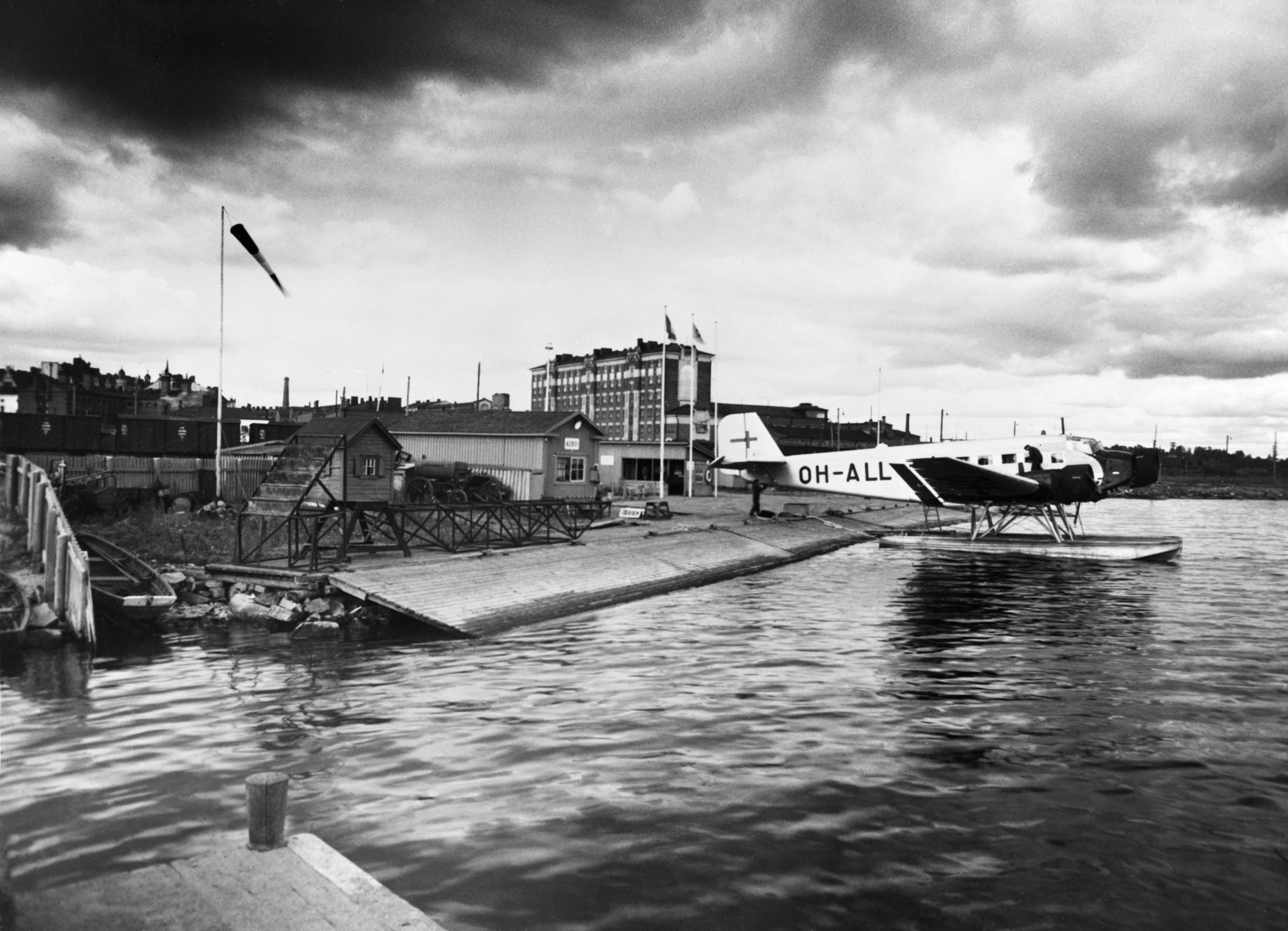
- A Junkers Ju 52 passenger aircraft Kaleva (OH-ALL) of Aero O/Y at Katajanokka Airport (1936)
- IATA: none; ICAO: none

Summary
- Airport type: Seaplane base
- Serves: Helsinki
- Location: Katajanokka, Helsinki, Finland
- Opened: 1924
- Closed: 1936
- Time zone: EET (GMT+02:00)
- Elevation AMSL: 0 ft (0 m)
- Coordinates: 60°09′52″N 024°58′20″E

Map
- Location within Finland

The Katajanokka Airport (Finnish: Katajanokan lentosatama) was the first airport in Finland, located in the Katajanokka neighbourhood in Helsinki. It functioned as a seaplane base in the south-eastern shore of Katajanokka during the years 1924–1936. Its history ended when the Helsinki-Malmi Airport was inaugurated on 16 December 1936.

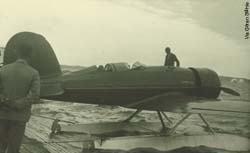
Charles Lindbergh at Katajanokka Airport in 1933 when he was advising Finns on founding a new airport.

Aero Oy began its flights from Katajanokka on 20 March 1924 at 15:40 with a Junkers F 13 D-335 aircraft. The crew consisted of a German pilot and a mechanic. The first Finnish pilot, Gunnar Lihr, began his flights during the summer of the same year. The routes of Aero went to Stockholm, Tallinn and Riga. From the very start, the company had two flights to Tallinn on every day of the week. Stockholm was not as popular as Tallinn, with six flights a week. The flight to Stockholm took three hours, but in the event of contrary winds, the flight time could be up to half an hour longer.

With its partners, Aero could offer flights to Königsberg, from where passengers could continue to Berlin by train.

Other companies also used the Katajanokka airport, and there were also sightseeing flights operated from there.

During the summer, the planes had floats, and during the winter either skis or wheels were used for landing and taking off. At the time when ice was only forming or it was melting away, the flights were not operated. This period could last for up to two months each spring and autumn.

In 1928, there was an attempt to move the airport to Kellosaari, now part of Ruoholahti, but this venture was not successful, and Katajanokka remained the only airport in Helsinki.
