= Aerolíneas Argentinas Flight 648 (1988) =

1988 runway overrun in Ushuaia, Argentina

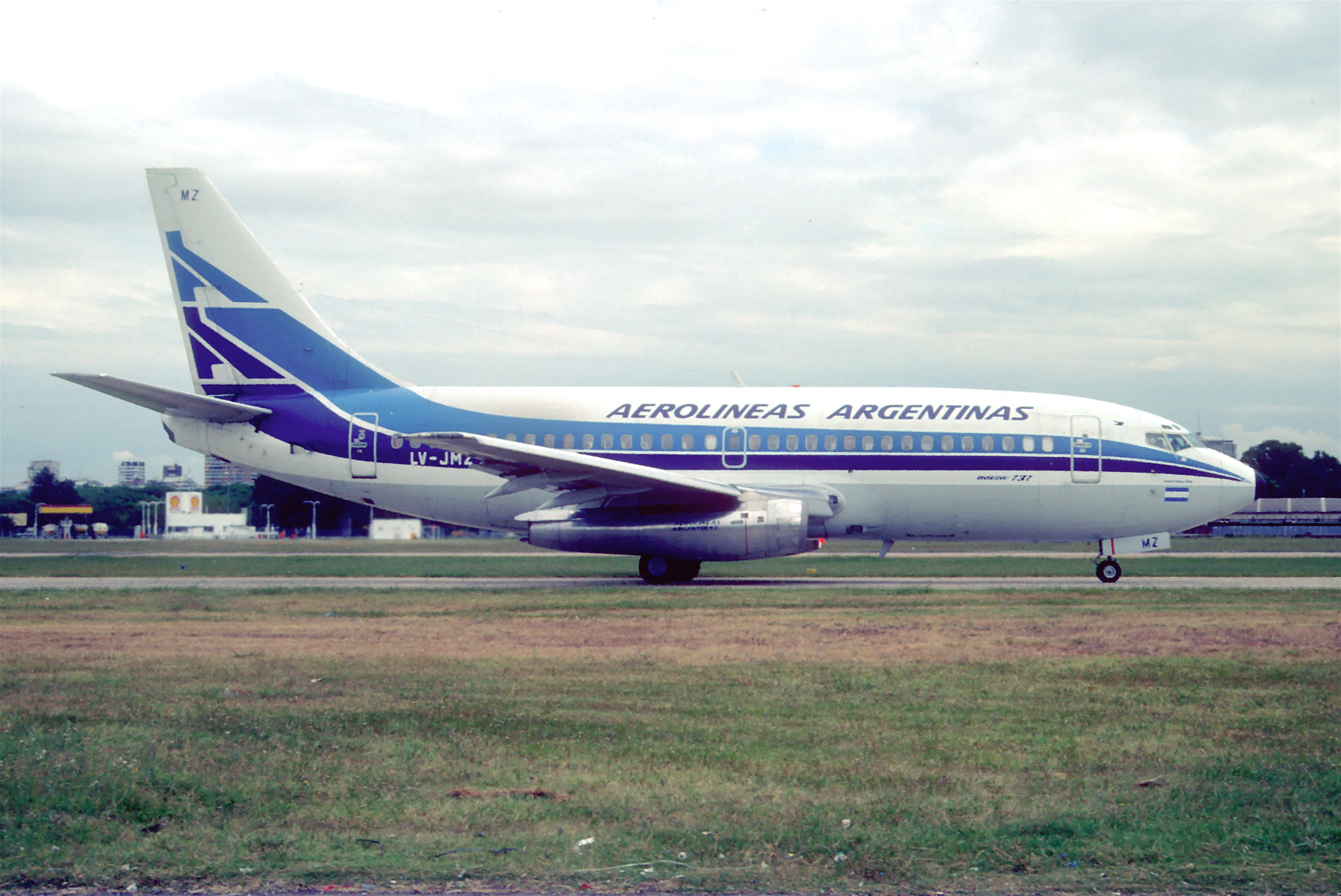
- An Aerolíneas Argentinas Boeing 737-287 similar to the one involved

Accident
- Date: September 26, 1988
- Summary: Runway excursion due to crosswind
- Site: Beagle Channel, near Ushuaia Aeroclub, Ushuaia, Argentina

Aircraft
- Aircraft type: Boeing 737-287
- Operator: Aerolíneas Argentinas
- Registration: LV-LIU
- Flight origin: Aeroparque Jorge Newbery, Buenos Aires, Argentina
- 1st stopover: Comandante Espora Airport, Bahía Blanca, Argentina
- Last stopover: Hermes Quijada International Airport, Río Grande, Argentina
- Destination: Ushuaia Aeroclub, Ushuaia, Argentina
- Occupants: 62
- Passengers: 56
- Crew: 6
- Fatalities: 0
- Injuries: 13
- Survivors: 62

Aerolíneas Argentinas Flight 648 was a domestic flight in Argentina en routing Buenos Aires - Bahía Blanca - Río Grande - Ushuaia. On September 26, 1988, the Boeing 737-287 overran the runway and went into the Beagle Channel, injuring 13 of the 56 passengers and 6 crew members on board, but no one died.

== Accident ==
As the plane began to descend, wind started to pick up. The first contact with the local airport was at 11:20, when the wind speed was 22 km/h (12 knots). Minutes later, it increased to 37 km/h (20 knots), and the wind direction shifted by about 160°. At 11:36 AM, the aircraft landed at 259 km/h (140 knots), too fast for the indicated speed (237 km/h, 128 knots). It bounced violently against the tarmac as the touchdown had the force of 1,89 G and veered off the runway, collided with an embankment and came to rest at water 22 second after touchdown. Five occupants sustained severe injuries, eight with minor and the aircraft was destroyed.

A passenger laid motionless at the right side of the aircraft, so the option was excluded. The rear door was also closed due to Boeing flight manual. The slides had failed on impact, so the passengers evacuated through the front left door and the window on the same side. The co-pilot was knocked unconcious, so he was treated personally by the assistant flight attendant.

== Investigation ==
In this accident, the pilot was fully qualified to fly, holding a TLA license, and of his 7,000 flight hours, approximately 1,500 were on a Boeing 737. The co-pilot was also experienced in handling unforeseen situations. Wind was the primary cause of the accident. When the aircraft touched down, in addition to excessive speed, it was destabilized by strong winds that were constantly shifting in direction and intensity.

== Aftermath ==
Due to its dangerous nature and accidents related to the area, it was replaced in 1995 for Ushuaia – Malvinas Argentinas International Airport with a new runway, which is longer and more comfortable for landing.
