= Taichung Shuinan Economic and Trade Park =

Industrial park in Xitun, Taichung, Taiwan

Shuinan Economic and Trade Park 臺中水湳經貿生態園區
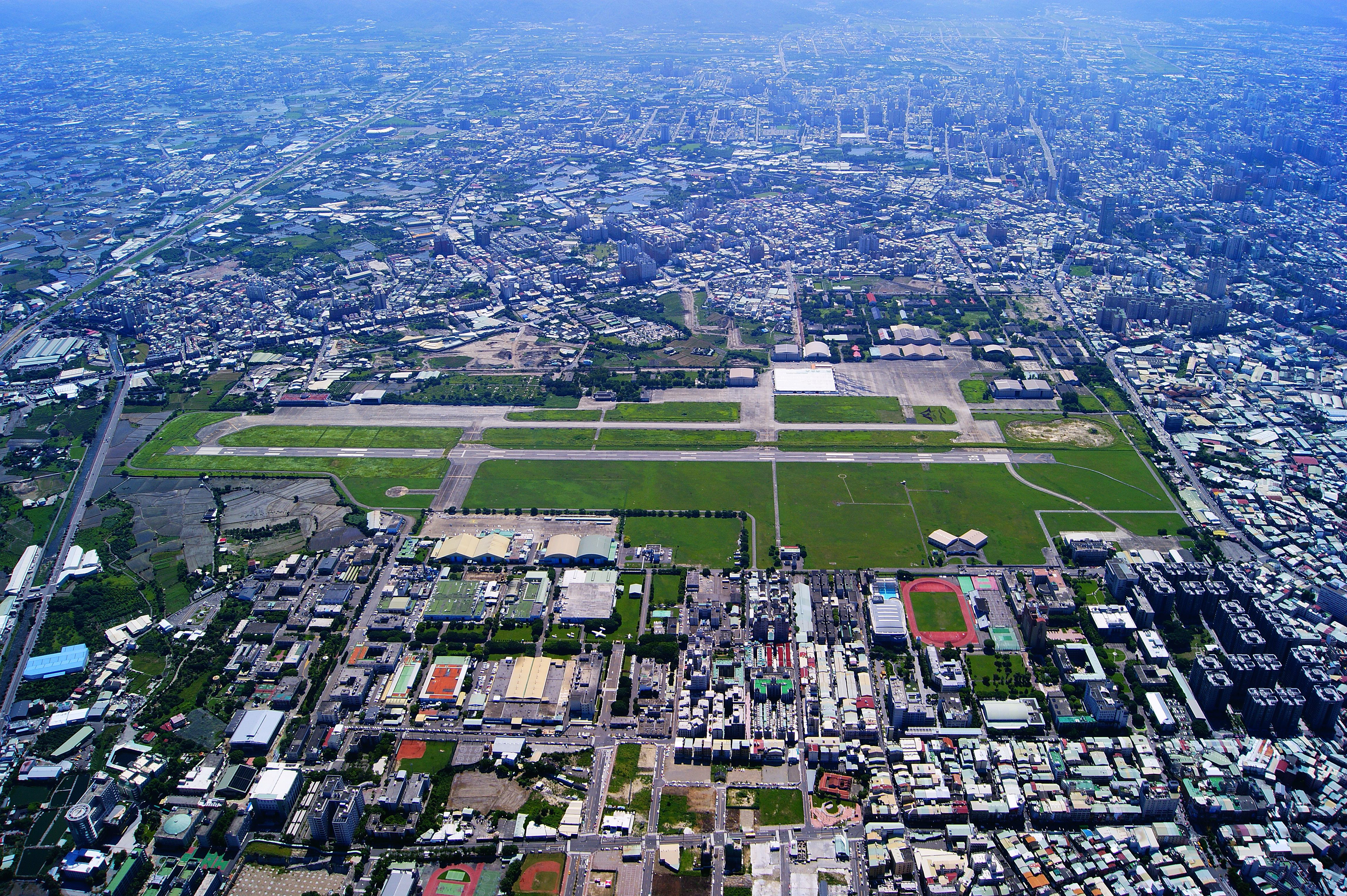

- Location within Taichung
- Location: Xitun, Taichung, Taiwan
- Coordinates: 24°11′12.8″N 120°39′11.1″E
- Opening date: 2004
- Size: 250 ha (620 acres)

The Shuinan Economic and Trade Park (traditional Chinese: 臺中水湳經貿生態園區; simplified Chinese: 台中水湳经贸生态园区; pinyin: Táizhōng Shuǐnǎn Jīngmào Shēngtài Yuánqū) is an industrial park in Xitun District, Taichung, Taiwan.

== History ==
The industrial park was built on the former Taichung Shuinan Airport site, which also included decommissioned air force base and agricultural lands. The construction phase was completed in 2004. The park was created by Stan Allen Architects in collaboration with the city of Taichung, Taiwan. The park utilizes a variety of techniques for salvaging the grey site into a usable urban space.

== Architecture ==
The industrial park spans over an area of 250 hectares and consists of cultural district, college town and canal district. The park was designed by Stan Allen Architects.

== See also ==
- Economy of Taiwan
- Taichung International Convention and Exhibition Center
- Taichung’s 7th Redevelopment Zone
