= Bulltoftaparken =

Park in Malmö, Sweden

Coordinates: 55.599986°N 13.066798°E

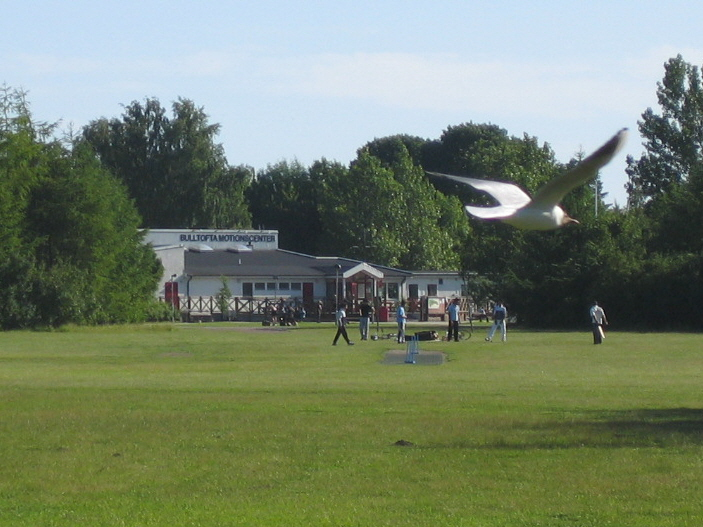
View from Bulltoftaparken

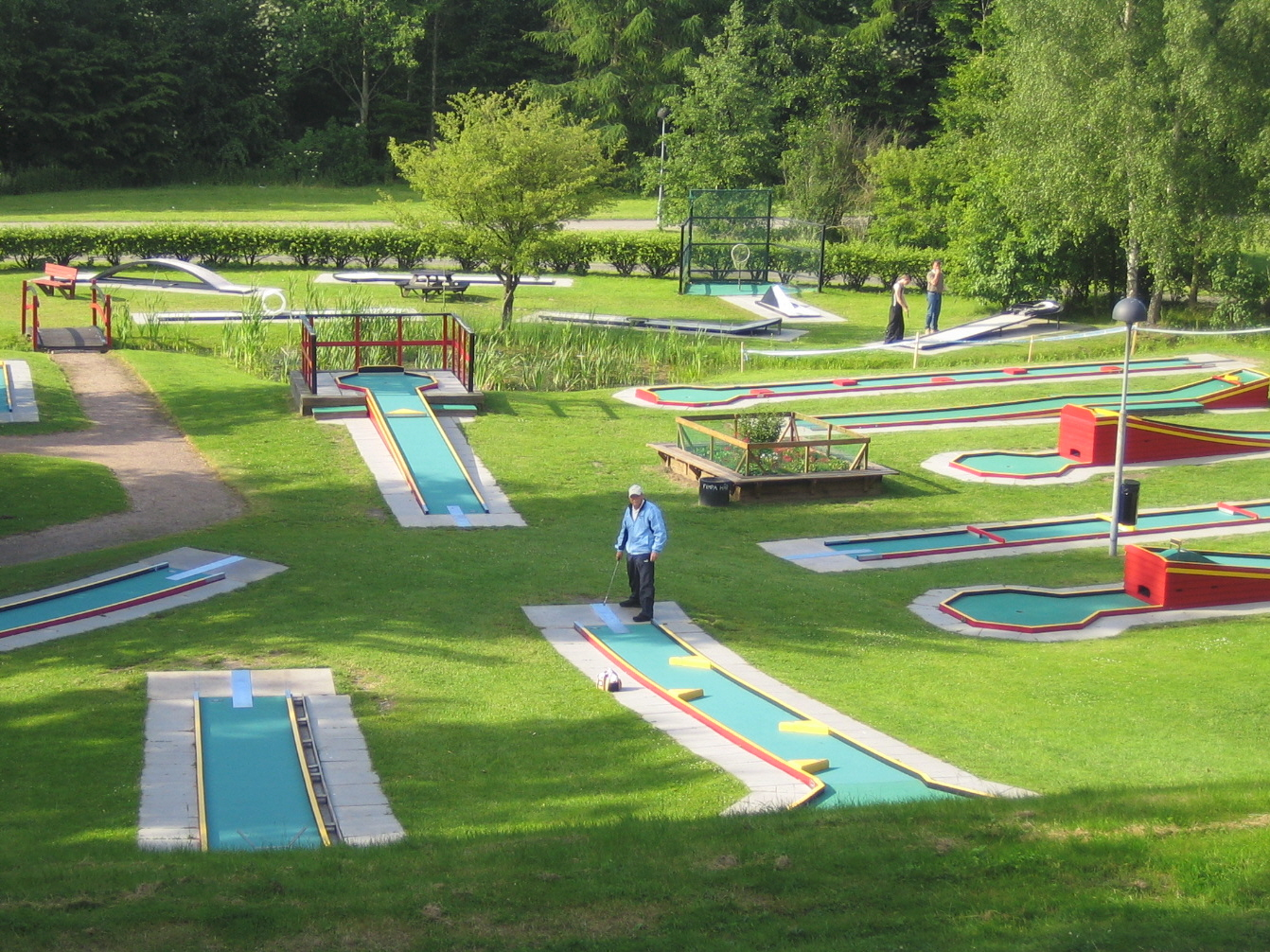
View from Bulltoftaparken

Bulltoftaparken is a park in Malmö, Sweden.
