= Shuinan Airport =

Former airport that served Xitun, Taichung, Taiwan (1911–2012)

Taichung Shuinan Airport
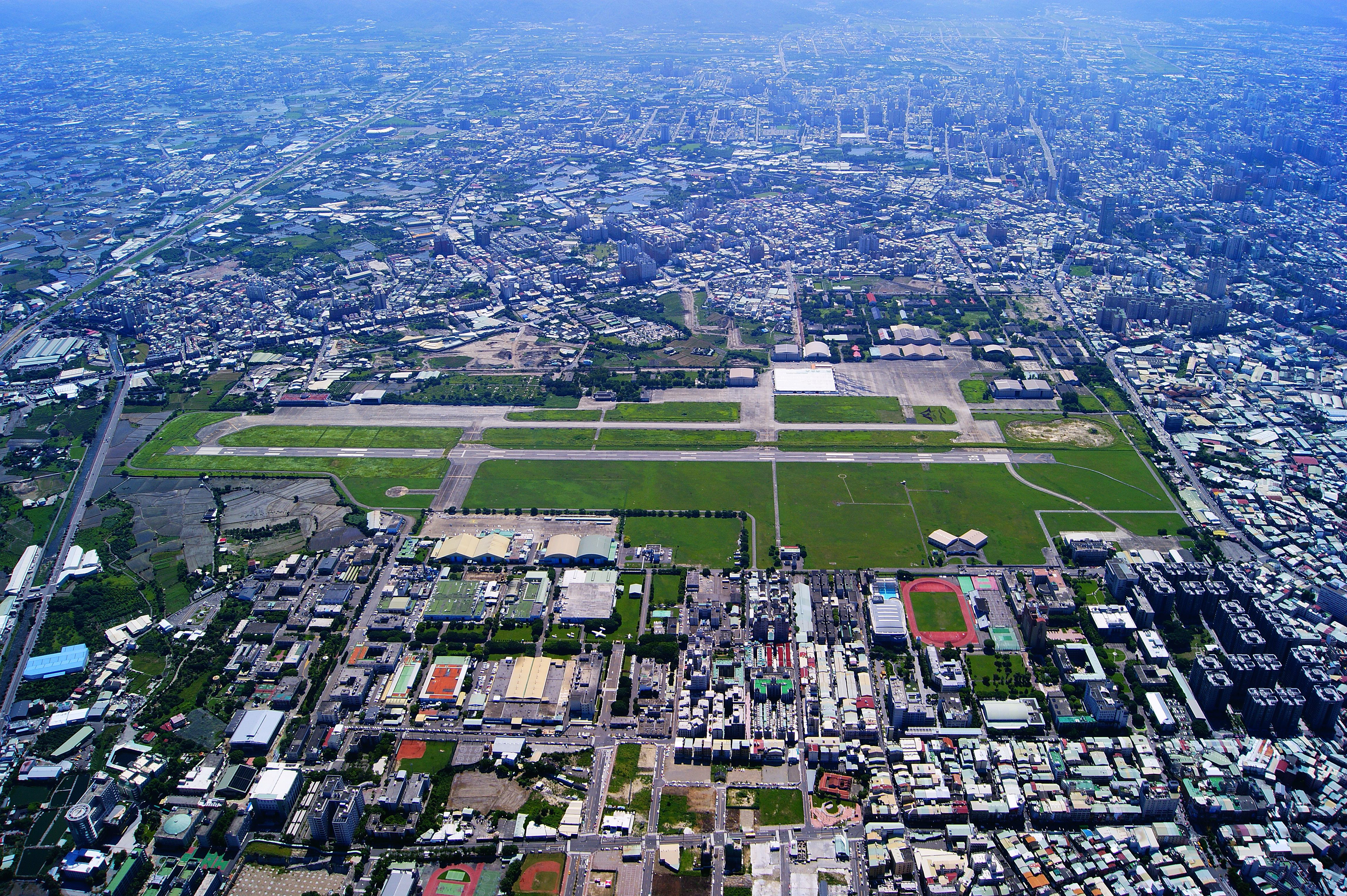
- Aerial view of Shuinan Airport before its closure
- IATA: ~~TXG~~; ICAO: ~~RCLG~~

Summary
- Airport type: Defunct
- Owner: Civil Aeronautics Administration, Republic of China Air Force
- Operator: Civil Aeronautics Administration
- Serves: Taichung
- Location: Xitun District
- Opened: 1911
- Closed: August 2012
- Passenger services ceased: March 5, 2004
- Occupants: Republic of China Air Force
- Time zone: National Standard Time (UTC+08:00)
- Coordinates: 24°10′55″N 120°39′23″E
- Interactive map of Taichung Shuinan Airport

Runways
Direction	Length		Surface
Direction	ft	m	Surface
~~18/36~~	~~5,315~~	~~1,620~~	~~Asphalt~~

Statistics (2003)
- Aircraft: 27,940
- Passengers: 944,839
- Cargo: 2035.8 tonnes

Taichung Shuinan Airport ~~(IATA: TXG, ICAO: RCLG)~~ (Chinese: 臺中水湳機場; pinyin: Táizhōng Shuǐnǎn Jīchǎng) was an airport located in Xitun District, Taichung, Taiwan. It had an area of 250 hectares. The name originates from Shuinan, a village in nearby Beitun District.

== History ==
Shuinan Airport was built during the Japanese rule of Taiwan for the Imperial Japanese Army, while also provided commercial flights, the only airport in Taichū Prefecture to do so. The airport provided scheduled flights directly to Japan. During World War II, Shuinan Airport was also used for kamikaze missions.

After the Surrender of Japan, the Republic of China Air Force took control of the airport. The airport was the only military site in Taichung not taken by civilians during the February 28 Incident. Between 1950 and 1980, Shuinan Airport became an important hub for Taiwan's aerospace industry, being home to the Aerospace Industrial Development Corporation.

Between 1946 and 1970, the airport was only used for military purposes. However, commercial flights were first offered in 1971 with the construction of a passenger terminal. The airport also saw increased traffic with the Taiwan Provincial Government's move to Zhongxing New Village in central Taiwan.

With the rapid development of Taichung City, the airport was gradually surrounded with buildings, limiting its growth. To facilitate for international flights, all flights were moved to Ching Chuan Kang Airport on March 5, 2004. The site of Shuinan Airport and its surrounding land were developed into the Taichung Shuinan Economic and Trade Park. With the National Airborne Service Corps moving to Ching Chuan Kang in August 2012, Shuinan Airport officially ceased operations.

The world's largest self-generating wave tank ever built for a motion picture, with a capacity of 1.7 million imperial gallons (7.7 Ml), was built on the site to film the ocean scenes of Life of Pi.
