= Ushuaia Aeroclub =

Airport in Argentina

Ushuaia Aeroclub Aeroclub Ushuaia
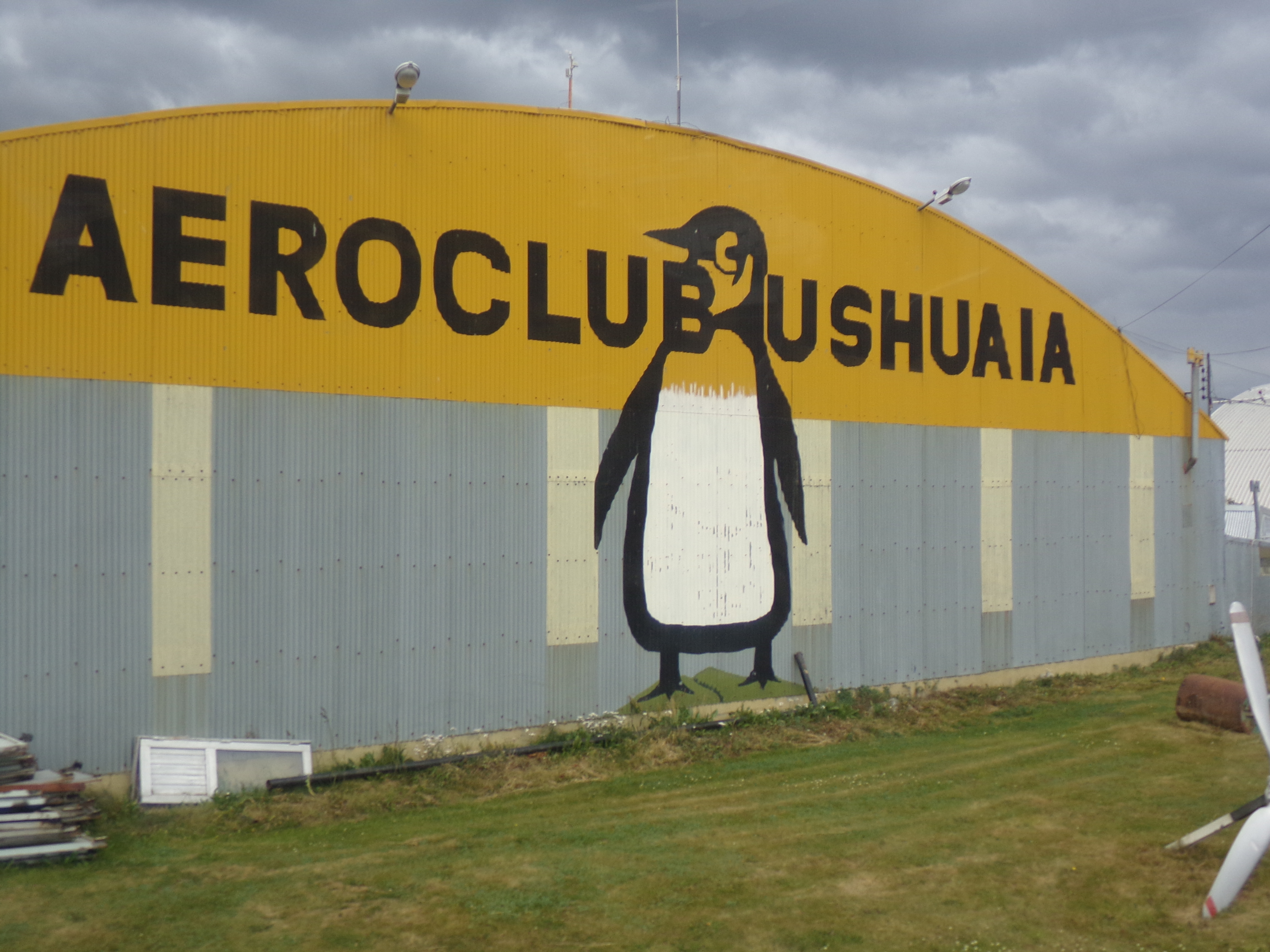
- Mural on one of the airfield's hangars
- IATA: none; ICAO: SAWO; LID: EAU

Summary
- Airport type: Public
- Serves: Ushuaia, Argentina
- Elevation AMSL: 19 ft / 6 m
- Coordinates: 54°49′22″S 68°18′15″W

Map
- Location of Ushuaia Aeroclub in Argentina

Runways
Direction	Length		Surface
Direction	m	ft	Surface
16/34	1,615	5,299	Asphalt
- Source: GCM, DoD FLIP

Ushuaia Aeroclub (Spanish: Aeroclub Ushuaia, ICAO: SAWO) is a public use airport serving Ushuaia, a city in the Tierra del Fuego Province of Argentina.

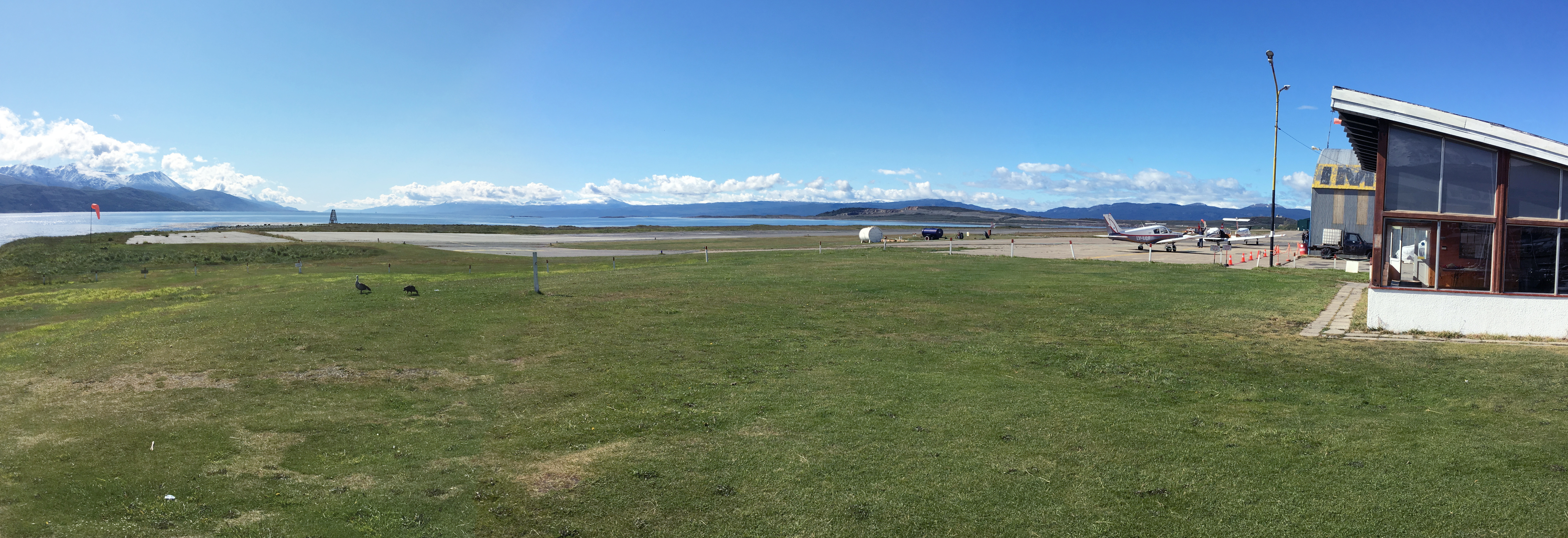
Ushuaia Aeroclub

In 1949 a Piper PA 12 with the argentinian aircraft pioneers Alberto Vico and Gerardo Lorenzo landed on a meadow where today the Aeroclub is located. The aeroclub was founded in 1954. In 1959 a pilot training school opened.

The airport is along the western shore of Ushuaia Bay, a harbor on the northern coast of the Beagle Channel. The runway has 50 metres (160 ft) paved overruns on each end. Approach and departures will be partially over the water. The Aeroclub previously served as Ushuaia's main airport before the opening of Ushuaia – Malvinas Argentinas International Airport in 1995, whose east–west runway is only 1.6 kilometres (1 mi) directly south of the Aeroclub runway. The airport is infamous for pilots having to make sharp turns during landings. A video has gone viral of a Aerolineas Argentinas Boeing 737-200 attempting to land at the airport. Pictures of planes that have crashed while trying to land have also gone viral. The sharp turn needed to land at the airport has been compared to Kai Tak Airport.

The Ushuaia VOR (Ident: USU) is located 1.2 nautical miles (2 km) southeast of the airport. The Puerto Williams VOR-DME (Ident: PWL) is located 24.5 nautical miles (45 km) east-southeast of the Aeroclub Airport.

== See also ==
- Transport in Argentina
- List of airports in Argentina
