= Techo International Airport (Colombia) =

Former airport of Bogotá, Colombia (1930–1959)

Techo International Airport Aeropuerto Internacional de Techo
- IATA: ~~BOG~~; ICAO: ~~SKBO~~

Summary
- Airport type: Defunct
- Location: Bogotá, Colombia
- Opened: 7 August 1930
- Closed: 10 December 1959
- Coordinates: 4°37′44″N 74°08′45″W

Map
- Shown within Colombia

Runways
Direction	Length		Surface
Direction	ft	m	Surface
			Asphalt (Closed)

Techo International Airport ~~(IATA: BOG, ICAO: SKBO)~~ was the first airport in Bogotá, Colombia, which was in operation from 1930 to 1959, when it was replaced by El Dorado International Airport. It was adjacent to the current Monumento a las Banderas, on Avenida de Las Américas.

== History ==
After the founding of the Colombian Air Navigation Society and the German Colombian Society to provide air transport services, the initial steps to plan the construction of the Techo aerodrome were taken. The then manager of the Colombian American Society, Herman Kuehl, was the key man for the negotiation and construction of the aerodrome in the Techo premises. After meticulous work on the space, by 1928, this space already had a landing strip for light aircraft.

On August 7, 1930, the Techo aerodrome was completely inaugurated during the Government of Enrique Olaya Herrera. The airport was then fully operational for regular flights. Located on the site of the current Monumento a las Banderas, the aerodrome was strategically equipped with a runway estimated to be 40 meters wide, control and communication towers, buildings, broadcast towers, and a passenger platform. The founding of El Dorado International Airport in December 1959 led to the closure and subsequent demolition of Techo Airport.
