= Taichung BRT =

Former BRT system in Taichung, Taiwan

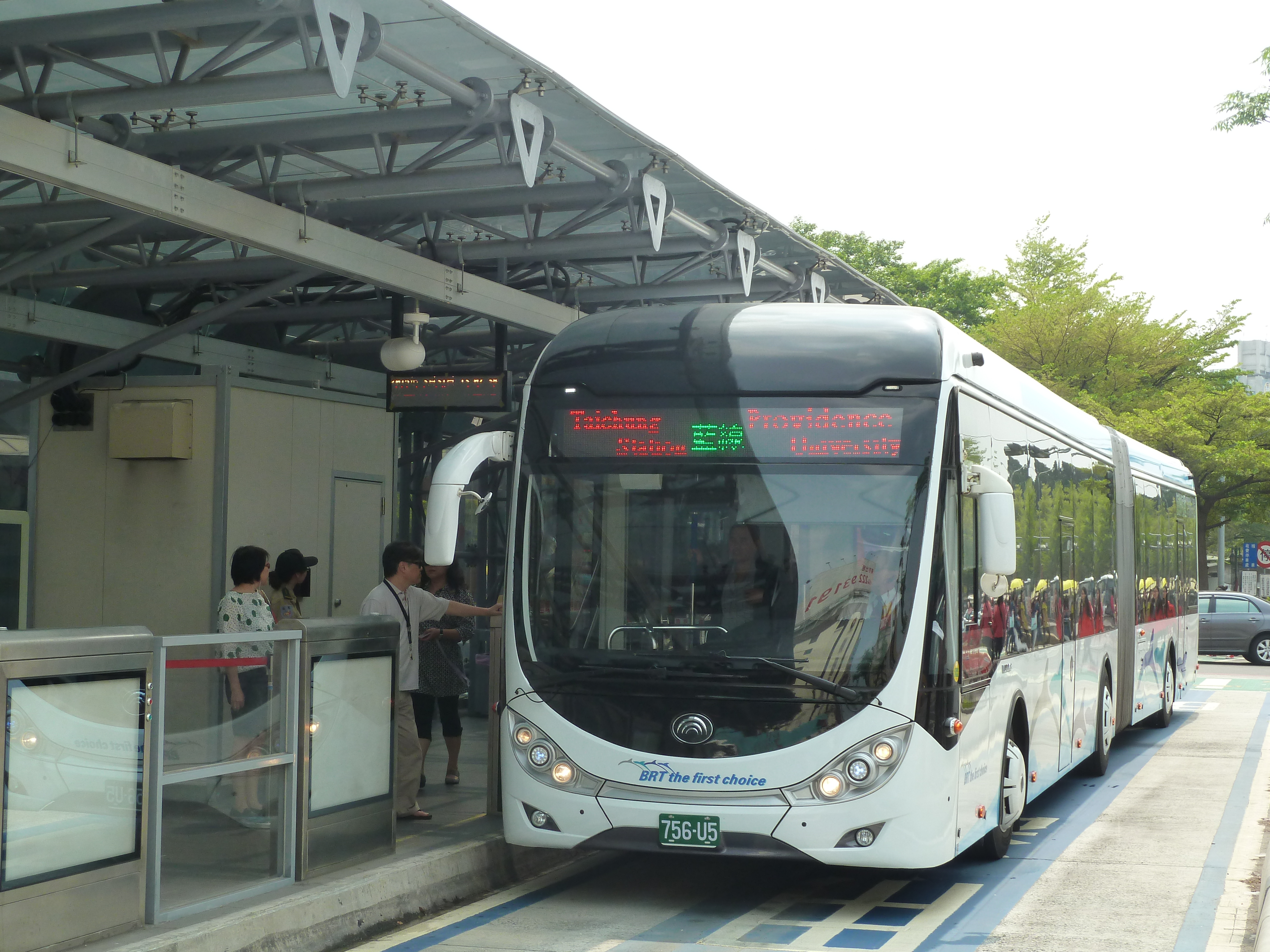
- A BRT bus at Taichung railway station. The platform has been removed.

Overview
- Status: Closed
- Began service: 28 July 2014
- Ended service: 8 July 2015

Route
- Route type: Bus rapid transit
- Locale: Taichung, Taiwan
- Length: 17.1 km (10.6 mi)
- Stations: 21

Service
- Frequency: 5–10 minutes

The Taichung BRT (Chinese: 臺中快捷巴士) was a bus rapid transit (BRT) system located in Taichung which stretched from Taichung TRA station to Providence University via Taiwan Boulevard, a major thoroughfare. The line was 17.1-kilometer (10.6 mi) in length with 21 stations. It was the first BRT line in Taiwan. After its discontinuation in 2015, the line was converted to a dedicated bus lane for conventional buses.

== Design and construction ==
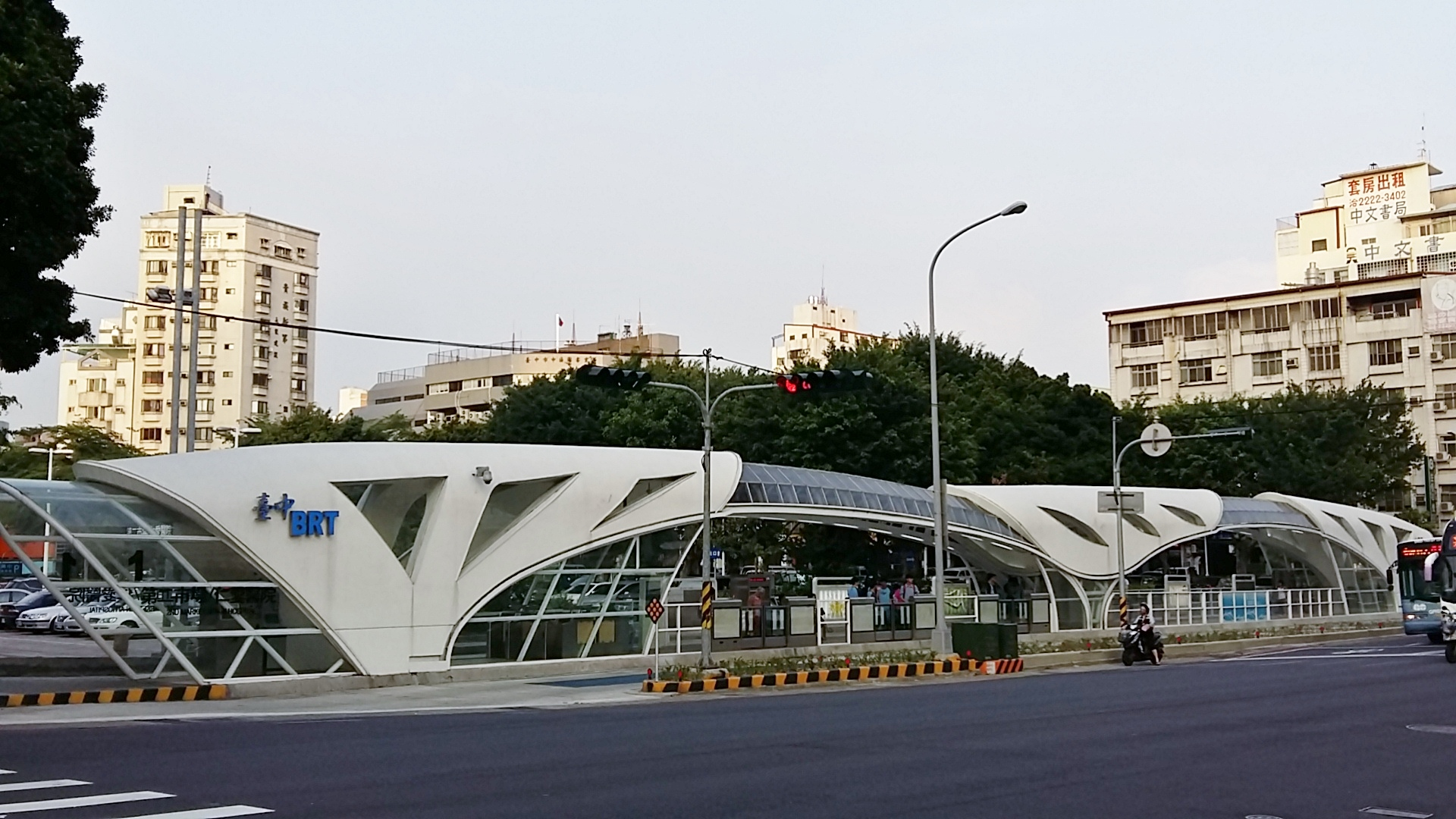
Second Market Place/Jen-Ai Hospital Station

An MRT system in Taichung has been planned since 1990; however, because of the high cost of building MRT system, the plan was never carried out. The Taichung City Government began planning for a BRT system in place of a MRT primarily because it would cost 25 times less. The BRT was promoted as an alternative during rush hour, since it ran on a designated lane.

The system was entirely composed of articulated buses. Unlike conventional buses, the fare was to be paid at the stations, not on the bus. The stations featured ticket gates at the entrance of the station, as well as automatic platform gates that would open and close simultaneously with bus doors. Signal priority was to be given to the buses to save travel time.

The director of Taichung Bureau of Transportation, Mr. Lin, also stated that if one day MRT is constructed, BRT will still be operating instead of being replaced by MRT.

Articulated buses were legalized in Taiwan in February 2012, and construction of BRT blue line started in November 2013. The line opened for the public on July 27, 2014.

== Operation ==
The line opened for the public on July 27, 2014. The Blue Line operated between the Taichung TRA Station in Central District and Providence University in Shalu District, with a control center located in Shalu. It took 40 minutes to get from one terminal to another. The route had a dedicated on both sides, except for the section on Taiwan Boulevard Sect. 1 and between the stations Fu'an and Maple Valley Park. A bus arrived approximately every 5–10 minutes to a station. Operation began at 6:00 AM and ended at 11:00 PM at the Taichung Train Station, and began at 5:00 and ended at 10:00 PM at Providence University.

=== Features ===
- All buses are articulated buses.
- Unlike conventional buses, BRT fares are charged in BRT stations, not on the buses.
- All BRT stations are fitted with automatic platform gates open or close simultaneously with the bus doors.
- Signal priority are installed at the intersection of BRT route to shorten traveling time.
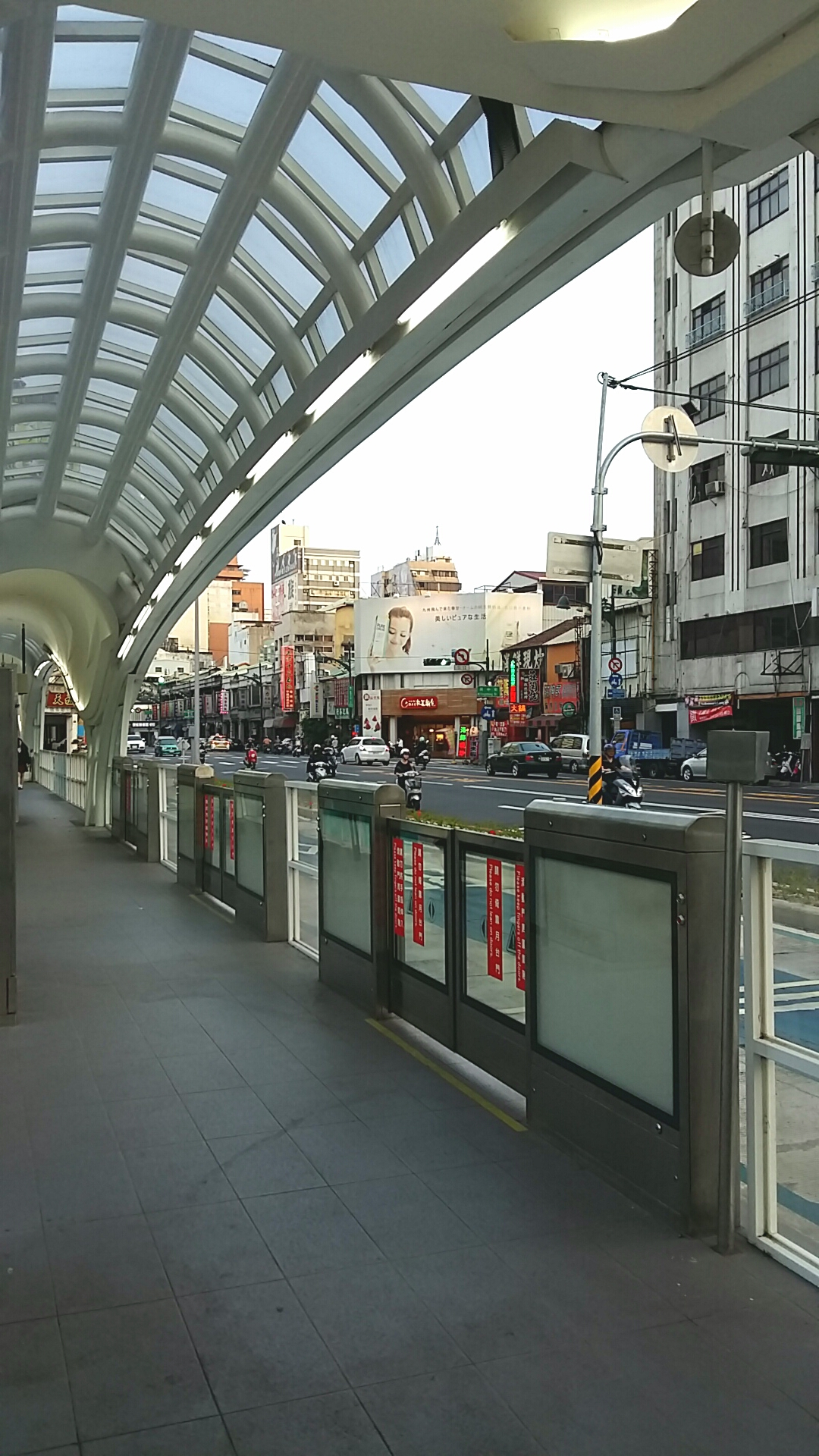
Platform gates at BRT Jen-ai Hospital station

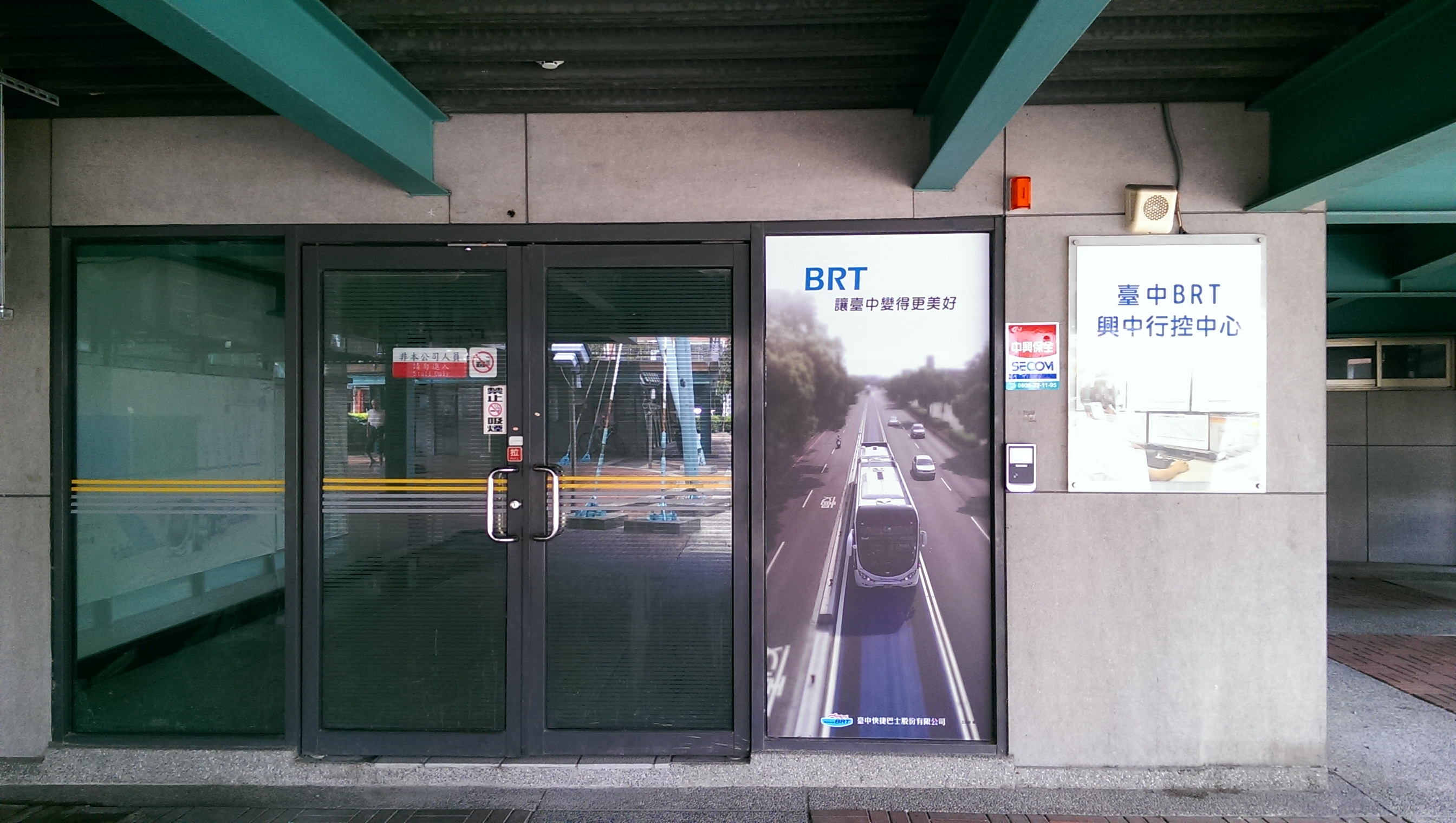
BRT control center

=== Criticism ===
Taichung BRT blue line was open to the public on July 28; however, many of the facilities were still under construction, which prompted much criticism. Based on a poll conducted in August 2014, only 16.9% of the passengers were satisfied with the system, and only 25.5% of the passengers said that they would change how they travel based on the new service. However, on September 13, according to the poll carried out by the Taichung Youth City Government (台中青年市政府), 51% of the passengers were satisfied with the BRT system, 37% felt indifferent, and 12% were dissatisfied with the system. Proponents of the system stated that because of the BRT lane's signal priority and designated lane, travel time became much shorter.

== List of stations ==
Code	Station Name	Station Name (Chinese)	Location		Transfer
BRT Blue Line
A01	Taichung Railway Station	臺中火車站	Central	Taichung City	TRA █ MRT Red Line (due 2016) █ BRT Orange Line (Planned)
A02	Chang Hwa Bank (planned)	彰化銀行	Central	Taichung City	
A03	Second Market Place / Jen-Ai Hospital	第二市場 / 仁愛醫院	Central	Taichung City	
A05	Qiedongjiao	茄苳腳	West	Taichung City	
A06	Chung-Cheng Elementary School	中正國小	West	Taichung City	
A07	National Museum of Natural Science	科博館	West	Taichung City	
A08	Chung-Ming Elementary School	忠明國小	West	Taichung City	
A09	Dinghecuo	頂何厝	Xitun	Taichung City	
A10	Taichung City Hall	市政府	Xitun	Taichung City	█ MRT Green Line (due 2018)
A11	Shin Kong Mitsukoshi/Top City Dept. Store	新光/遠百	Xitun	Taichung City	
A12	Maple Valley Park	秋紅谷	Xitun	Taichung City	
A13	Fu-an	福安	Xitun	Taichung City	
A14	Zhonggang New Community	中港新城	Xitun	Taichung City	
A15	Cheng Ching Hospital	澄清醫院	Xitun	Taichung City	
A16	Yumen Rd.	玉門路	Xitun	Taichung City	
A17	Taichung Veterans General Hospital/Tunghai University	榮總/東海大學	Xitun	Taichung City	
A18	Donghai Villa	東海別墅	Xitun	Taichung City	
A19	Pingding	坪頂	Longjing	Taichung City	
A20	Zhengying Rd.	正英路	Shalu	Taichung City	
A21	Hungkuang University	弘光科技大學	Shalu	Taichung City	
A22	Jinjiangliao	晉江寮	Shalu	Taichung City	
A23	Providence University	靜宜大學	Shalu	Taichung City	

Code	Station Name	Station Name	Location		Transfer
BRT Blue Line West Extension (Planned)
A24	Hongzhu Lane	紅竹巷	Shalu	Taichung City	
A25	Sha-Lu Industrial High School	沙鹿高工	Shalu	Taichung City	
A26	Zhonggang Elementary School	中港國小	Wuqi	Taichung City	
A27	Qiucuozhuang（Tungs MetroHarbor Hospital (Wuci Branch)）	邱厝庄（童綜合醫院）	Wuqi	Taichung City	
A28	Wuci Elementary School	梧棲國小	Wuqi	Taichung City	
A29	Taichung Harbor Bureau	港務大樓	Wuqi	Taichung City	
A30	Taichung Harbor Passenger Service Center	臺中港旅客服務中心	Wuqi	Taichung City	
		梧棲機廠	Wuqi	Taichung City	

== Closure ==
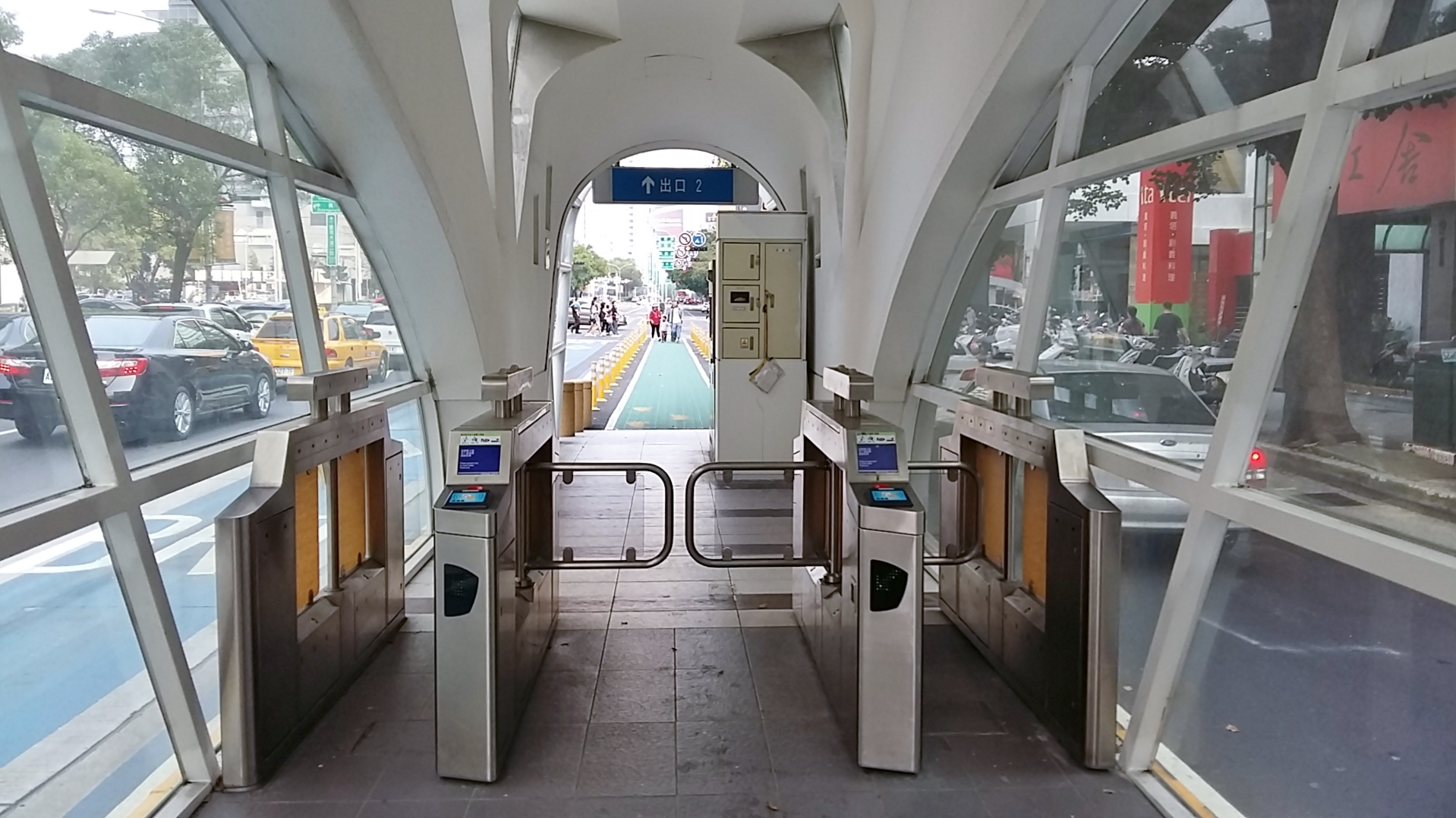
Even though turnstiles were installed at all stations, they were never used.

In November 2014, Taichung elected a new mayor Lin Chia-lung. On December 27, 2014, the newly elected mayor visited the temporary BRT operation center; he criticized the system, calling it a hoax. He pointed out that the 4 billion cost was unjustified and identified the five main deficiencies of the system. He called a total demolition of the system. The decision did not come without opposition; on Jan 24, almost all of the citizens participating in a public forum were against abolishing the system, stating that the system was a lot more efficient than standard buses and the government should just improve on existing facilities. However, despite the opponents of abolishing the BRT, it ceased operations on July 8, 2015.

Following the discontinuation of the BRT system and conversion into a standard bus lane, the articulated buses and stations continued to be used. The buses were renamed as bus routes 300, 309, and 310, and now share the lane with conventional low-floor buses. Smart cards now have to be swiped on the bus and the BRT equipment at the stations has been deactivated.

== See also ==
- Chiayi Bus Rapid Transit
- Blue line (Taichung MRT)
