= Former Hua Nan Bank Taichung Branch =

Coordinates: 24°08′28″N 120°40′53″E

- 華南銀行台中分行舊址
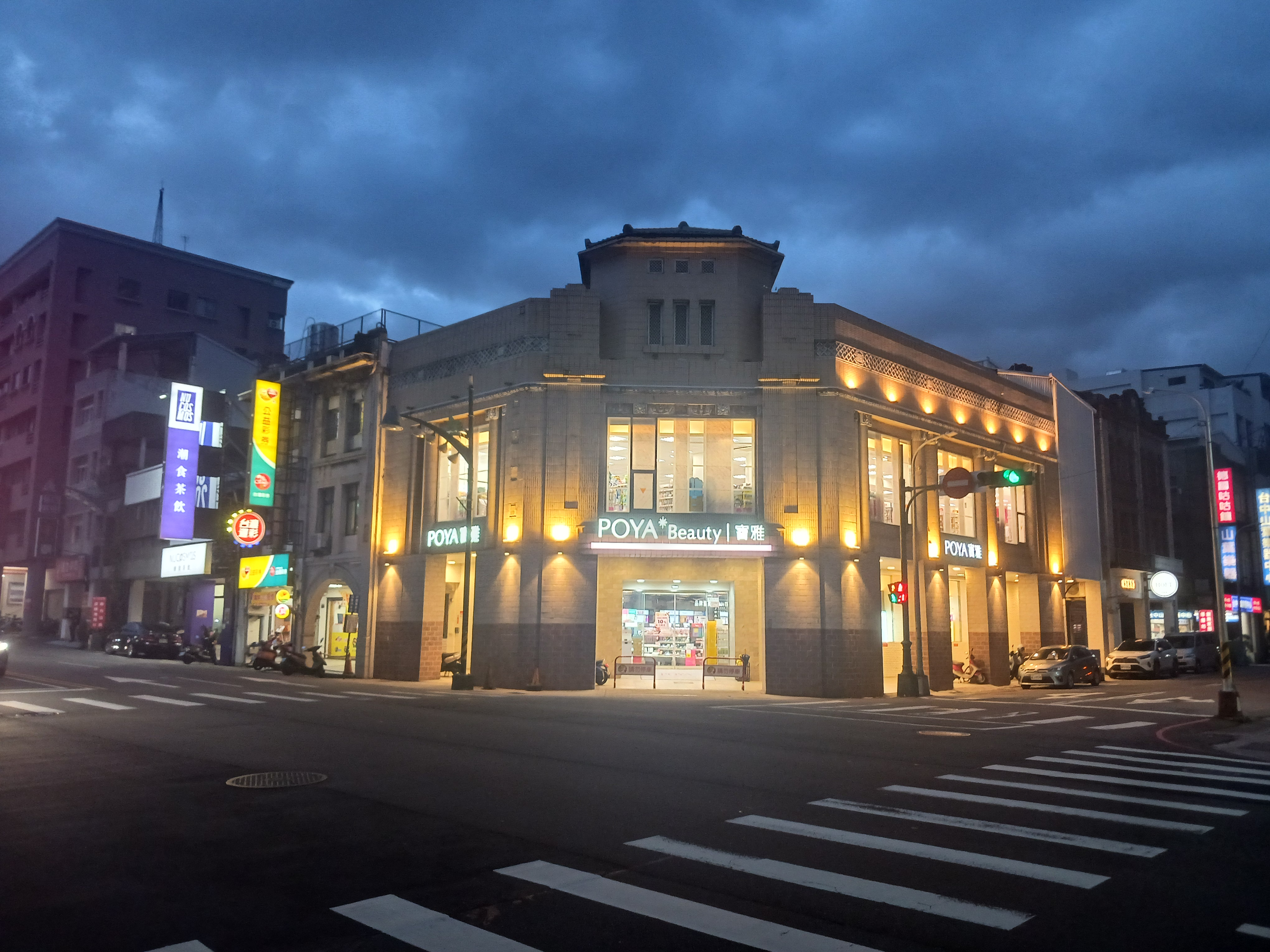
- The building in June 2026
- Interactive map of the Former Hua Nan Bank Taichung Branch area
- Former names: Mei Hua Tai Zhongzheng Store
- Alternative names: Poya Taichung Zhongzheng Store

General information
- Status: Completed
- Type: Commercial
- Architectural style: Eclecticism, Imperial Crown Style
- Location: No. 238, Section 1, Taiwan Boulevard, Central District, Taichung, Taiwan
- Current tenants: Poya
- Completed: October 1952
- Opened: October 1952
- Renovated: June 2020
- Owner: Hua Nan Commercial Bank

The Former Hua Nan Bank Taichung Branch (Chinese: 華南銀行台中分行舊址) is a commercial building situated at the junction of Taiwan Boulevard and Shifu Road in the Central District of Taichung, Taiwan. Completed in October 1952, the building blends the eclectic design vocabulary that persisted from the Japanese colonial era with an Imperial Crown Style tower (興亞式) at its apex. The property remains under the ownership of Hua Nan Commercial Bank and currently operates as the Poya Taichung Zhongzheng Store, a branch of the island-wide Poya retail chain.

The building's architectural appearance was largely unknown to the public for over thirty years, during which the cosmetics retailer Mei Hua Tai concealed the entire façade behind steel-framed advertising hoardings. When Poya took over the lease in June 2020 and stripped away the cladding during renovations, the original exterior was unexpectedly revealed, sparking a public campaign that urged the new tenant to preserve the building's historic appearance. Poya's subsequent decision to abandon its signature pink branding in favour of a design sympathetic to the surrounding streetscape attracted widespread praise, and the outlet was widely described by Taiwanese media and internet users as the "most beautiful Poya in Taiwan". The installation of a pink corporate sign in 2023, however, drew sharp public backlash. Following further negotiations with the Taichung City Government, Poya removed the sign during a 2025 refurbishment and restored the store's 2020 appearance.

== Location and setting ==
The building stands on a wedge-shaped corner plot at the intersection of Taiwan Boulevard and Shifu Road, in the Central District. Directly across the street stands the Central Bookstore, with which the restored building is frequently described as forming a complementary pairing.

== Architecture ==
The building was completed in late October 1952. Its exterior reflects the eclectic architectural vocabulary inherited from the Japanese colonial period, featuring an Imperial Crown Style tower (興亞式) that surmounts the corner of the building, rendered in a warm ochre-yellow finish.

== History ==
=== Construction and early use ===
Hua Nan Commercial Bank opened its Taichung branch in the newly completed building in late October 1952. At a later date, the bank relocated its Taichung operations to a different site, and the original building was left without a permanent tenant.

=== Mei Hua Tai era (1990s–2020) ===
Beginning in the 1990s, the premises were leased to Mei Hua Tai, a Taiwanese cosmetics and personal-care retailer. Mei Hua Tai opened its Zhongzheng store (美華泰中正店) in the building and, in the process, erected a steel-framed external cladding structure supporting large advertising panels that entirely enveloped the façade. From street level, the building's original architectural detailing was invisible; passers-by saw nothing but Mei Hua Tai's commercial signage. This arrangement persisted for more than thirty years, and the building's original architectural appearance was largely forgotten by the general public.

In early 2020, Mei Hua Tai suffered severe financial losses amid the COVID-19 pandemic in Taiwan. In March 2020, the company announced the permanent closure of all fifteen of its remaining stores nationwide. The Zhongzheng store in the former bank building ceased trading on 30 April 2020.

=== Poya takeover and façade rediscovery (2020) ===
Following Mei Hua Tai's departure, Taichung city councillor Chiang Chao-kuo brokered the introduction of a new tenant: Poya, a major Taiwanese retail chain specialising in cosmetics, household goods, and personal-care products. Founded in 1985, Poya is known for a recognisable brand identity centred on the colour pink.

In June 2020, Poya commenced renovation work on the newly leased premises. As part of the fit-out, the steel-framed cladding that Mei Hua Tai had installed decades earlier was dismantled, and the underlying walls were cleaned. The removal of the hoardings exposed the building's original façade in its entirety for the first time in over three decades. The revelation attracted public attention, and a number of members of the public began an online petition urging Poya to preserve the newly uncovered exterior rather than conceal it again behind standard corporate branding.

Councillor Chiang Chao-kuo lent his support to the campaign and, together with officials from the Taichung City Government, entered into negotiations with Poya's management. The discussions culminated in a decision by Poya to break with its standard store format: rather than applying its customary pink colour scheme and branded signage, the company undertook a bespoke design. The renovated shop featured quartz-tiled flooring, warm yellow-toned lighting, and a deliberately muted, low-saturation colour palette intended to complement the historic façade.

The Poya Taichung Zhongzheng Store (寶雅台中中正店) opened to the public on 1 August 2020, representing the first occasion on which Poya had established a retail outlet in a historic building.

=== Public reception (2020) ===
The store's heritage-sensitive design was met with enthusiastic public approval. On social media platforms and internet forums, users praised Poya for prioritising the building's architectural character over its own brand uniformity. Several commentators noted that the restored building complemented the Central Bookstore across the road, lending the intersection a cohesive sense of historical identity. The outlet was widely described by Taiwanese media and internet users as the "most beautiful Poya in all of Taiwan" (全台最美寶雅). Some media outlets compared the adaptive reuse to that of Hayashi Department Store in Tainan, another colonial-era commercial building that had been successfully converted into a retail and cultural venue.

=== 2023 pink sign controversy ===
The Poya Taichung Zhongzheng Store as it appeared in 2024, with the pink signage installed in 2023

In August 2023, Poya installed a large pink sign — consistent with the company's standard corporate branding — on the exterior of the building. The alteration provoked an immediate and largely negative reaction from the public. Councillor Chiang Chao-kuo publicly expressed his disappointment, describing the change as "regrettable" (惋惜). On social media, the majority of commentators condemned the move, and some local residents explicitly called for the removal of the pink sign.

Poya responded by acknowledging public concerns and stating that its design team had endeavoured to preserve the building's original appearance even while incorporating corporate branding elements. The company stated that it accepted the feedback with an open mind and would hold further internal discussions on the matter.

Legal commentator Lin Chih-chun argued that the decision to revert to the pink signage was closely linked to Poya's brand strategy, the colour pink being so central to the chain's visual identity. The Cultural Heritage Office of the Taichung City Government confirmed that the former bank building held no formal cultural heritage designation, so alterations to its exterior were governed by the municipal regulations applicable to advertising fixtures on ordinary buildings. The city's Urban Development Bureau stated that it would conduct further consultations with Poya.

=== 2025 restoration ===
The Poya Taichung Zhongzheng Store as it appeared in 2026, with the pink signage removed in 2025

In 2025, when Poya undertook a refurbishment of the Zhongzheng store, the Urban Development Bureau of the Taichung City Government used the opportunity to coordinate the renovation details with the company, resulting in an agreement to remove the pink sign installed in 2023. Following the refurbishment, the building's exterior was largely restored to the condition it had been in upon the store's original opening in August 2020, with warm-toned lighting once again serving as the primary decorative treatment for the façade.

== Heritage status ==
The building has not been designated as a cultural heritage site, a historical monument, or a registered historic building. The Taichung City Government's Cultural Heritage Office has stated that the structure does not possess any formal heritage classification, and its exterior is therefore regulated under the same municipal ordinances that govern signage and advertising fixtures on standard commercial buildings.

== See also ==
- Eclecticism in architecture
- Imperial Crown Style
- Hayashi Department Store
- Central District, Taichung
- Hua Nan Commercial Bank
- Poya (department store)
