= Miyahara =

Miyahara may refer to:

- Miyahara (surname), a Japanese surname
- Miyahara, Kumamoto, a former town in Yatsushiro District, Kumamoto Prefecture, Japan
- Miyahara Station, a train station in Saitama, Saitama Prefecture, Japan
- Miyahara Ice Cream, a confectionery in Taichung, Taiwan
