= Provincial Highway 12 (Taiwan) =

Provincial highway in Taiwan

Provincial Highway 12
- 台12線
- Taiwan Boulevard

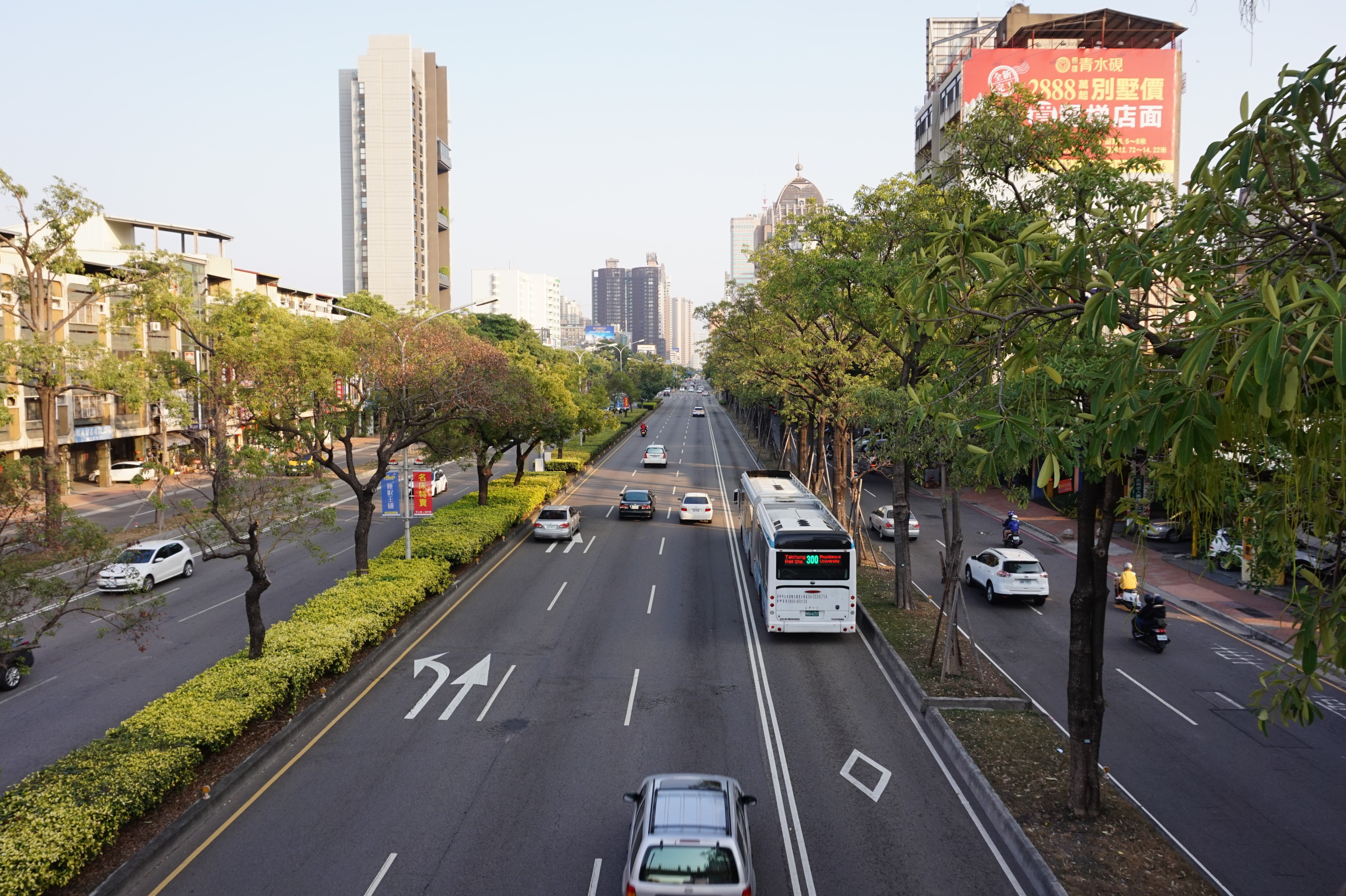
- Provincial Highway 12 in Xitun District. Note the two motorcycle lanes on both edges separated by a median, and the markings for the bus lane.

Route information
- Maintained by Directorate General of Highways
- Length: 23.147 km (14.383 mi)

Major junctions
- West end: Prov 17 in Port of Taichung
- Nat 1 in Xitun District; Prov 61 in Wuqi District
- East end: Taichung railway station

Location
- Country: Taiwan

Highway system
- Highway system in Taiwan
← Prov 11	→ Prov 13

Provincial Highway 12, named as Taiwan Boulevard (台灣大道) for its entire length, is a 23.2 km east–west highway that connects Port of Taichung in Wuqi with downtown Taichung City.

Highway 12 is one of the major thoroughfares of Taichung, connecting the historic downtown at Central District with its newer central business district in Xitun District. The road is also one of three that connect to National freeway 1 in Xitun. Between 2014 and 2015, the Taichung BRT ran on Highway 12 between Taichung railway station and Providence University in Shalu District, and there are plans to build a metro line at the BRT system's former course.

== Route description ==
Highway 12 begins with additional separated motorcycle lanes on each side at the intersection with Highway 17 in Wuqi District, near the gate of the Port of Taichung. The route runs southeast, crossing Highway 61 and Highway 1, before being elevated over the Western Trunk railway line via the Shalu Overpass (沙鹿陸橋). At downtown Shalu District, the route turns south and begins climbing the Dadu Plateau. At Providence University, the two lanes directly adjacent to the motorcycle lane divider become bus lanes, which were formerly dedicated to the Taichung BRT, but now permit conventional buses to run on. Near the peak, the road turns southeast and briefly enters Longjing District as it intersects Zhongxing Road, which connects to County Route 136 for access to National Freeway 3.

The road enters Xitun District as it descends into downtown Taichung. At the bottom, the road crosses the Fazi River, then connects to National Freeway 1 and Highway 74 before the middle lanes are elevated over County Route 127 on an overpass known as Guangming Overpass (光明陸橋). After crossing Highway 1B in West District, Taichung, the road's motorcycle lanes and bus lanes end. The road continues through Central District before ending at the north side of Taichung railway station.

== Major intersections ==
The entire route is in Taichung City.

Location	km	mi	Destinations	Notes
Wuqi	0.0	0.0	Prov 17 (Linggang Road, Section 2 and 3)	Continues as Taiwan Boulevard, Section 10
Wuqi	1.25	0.78	Prov 61 (Gangbu Road, Section 2 and 3)	Ramps to elevated expressway
Wuqi	2.96	1.84	Prov 1 (Zhonghua Road, Section 1 and 2)	Highway 1 crosses over on Zhonghua Overpass
Xitun	15.44	9.59	Cty 125 (Anhe Road)	
Xitun	16.22	10.08	Nat 1 (Taichung Interchange)	Combination interchange
Xitun	16.58	10.30	Prov 74 (Huanzhong Road, Section 2 and 3)	No access to elevated expressway
Xitun	16.96	10.54	Cty 127 (Liming Road, Section 2 and 3)	Middle lanes cross on Guangming Overpass
West	21.51	13.37	Prov 1B (Wuquan Road)	
Central	23.193	14.411	Jiangguo Road	
1.000 mi = 1.609 km; 1.000 km = 0.621 mi
