= Chang Hwa Bank Headquarters and Museum =

Bank and museum in Taichung, Taiwan

- 彰化銀行總行及行史館
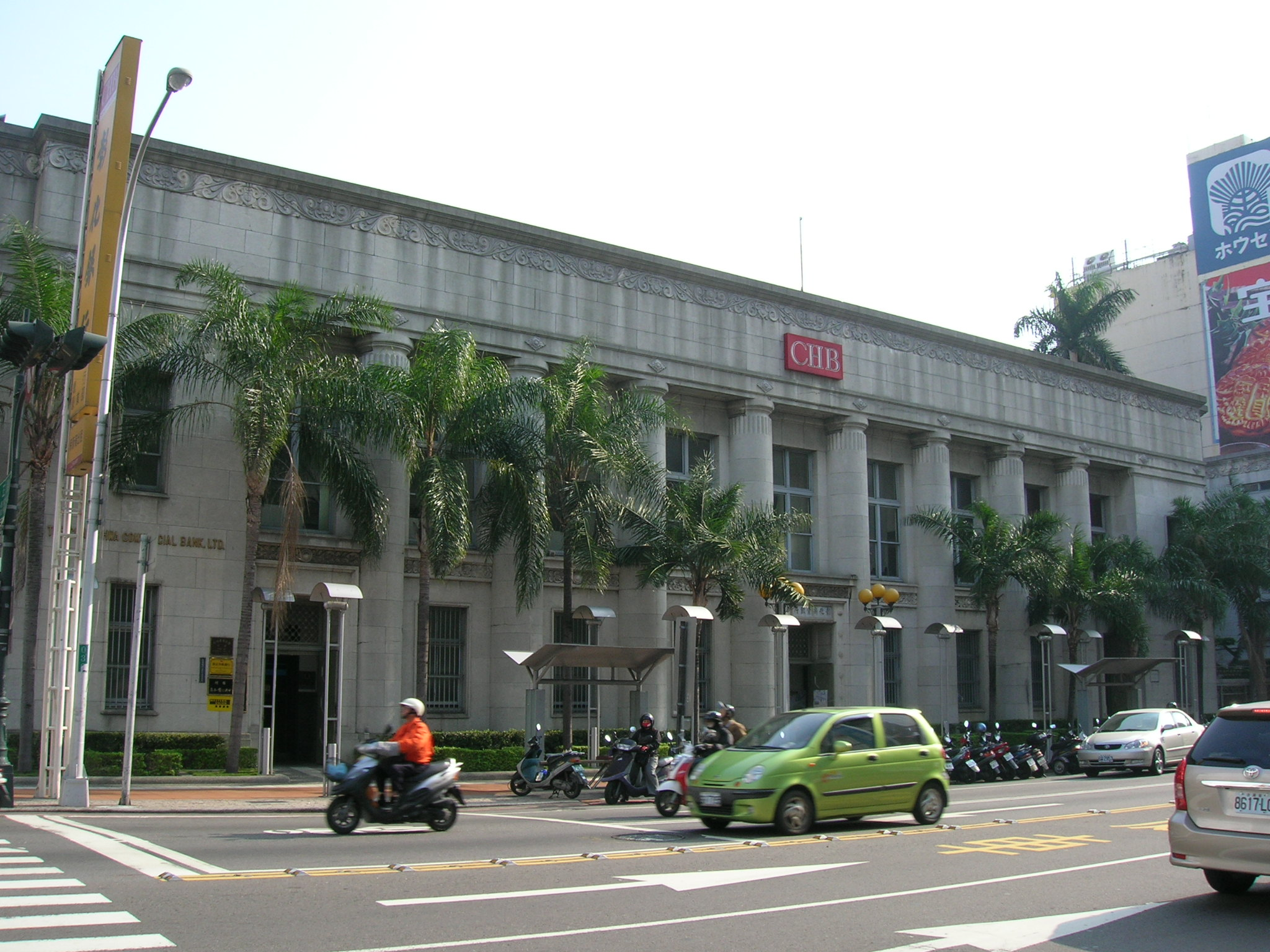
- Interactive map of the Chang Hwa Bank Headquarters and Museum area

General information
- Type: headquarters, museum
- Location: Central, Taichung, Taiwan
- Coordinates: 24°08′22.8″N 120°40′55.6″E

Height
- Architectural: Greek and Roman

The Chang Hwa Bank Headquarters and Museum (traditional Chinese: 彰化銀行總行及行史館; simplified Chinese: 彰化银行总行及行史馆; pinyin: Zhānghuà Yínháng Zǒngháng Jíxíng Shǐguǎn) is the headquarters office of Chang Hwa Bank and museum located in Central District, Taichung, Taiwan.

== History ==
The building was constructed during the Japanese rule of Taiwan.

== Architecture ==
The building was built with Greek and Roman style. The ground floor serves as the headquarters office of Chang Hwa Bank and the upper floor serves as the bank museum.

== Transportation ==
The building is located a short distance northwest of Taichung Station of Taiwan Railway.

== See also ==
- List of museums in Taiwan
