= Kang Chu Sports Park =

Sport center in Shalu, Taichung, Taiwan

- 港區運動公園
- Interactive map of Kang Chu Sports Park
- Location: Shalu, Taichung, Taiwan
- Coordinates: 24°12′14.8″N 120°33′54.5″E
- Type: sport center

Construction
- Opened: 30 December 2018
- Cost: NT$220 million

Website
- Official website (in Chinese)

The Kang Chu Sports Park (traditional Chinese: 港區運動公園; simplified Chinese: 港区运动公园; pinyin: Gǎng Qū Yùndòng Gōngyuán) is a sport center in Shalu District, Taichung, Taiwan. The center is the fourth sports park in Taichung.

== History ==
The soft opening of the sport center was done on 21 December 2018 which was attended by Taichung Mayor Lin Chia-lung. It was officially opened on 30 December 2018.

== Architecture ==
The sport center features fitness center, gymnastic room, table tennis room, badminton courts, outdoor roller rink etc. Its façade is painted with blue and white colors.

== See also ==
- Sports in Taiwan
