= Taichung City Second Market =

Public market in Central, Taichung, Taiwan

- 臺中市公有第二零售市場
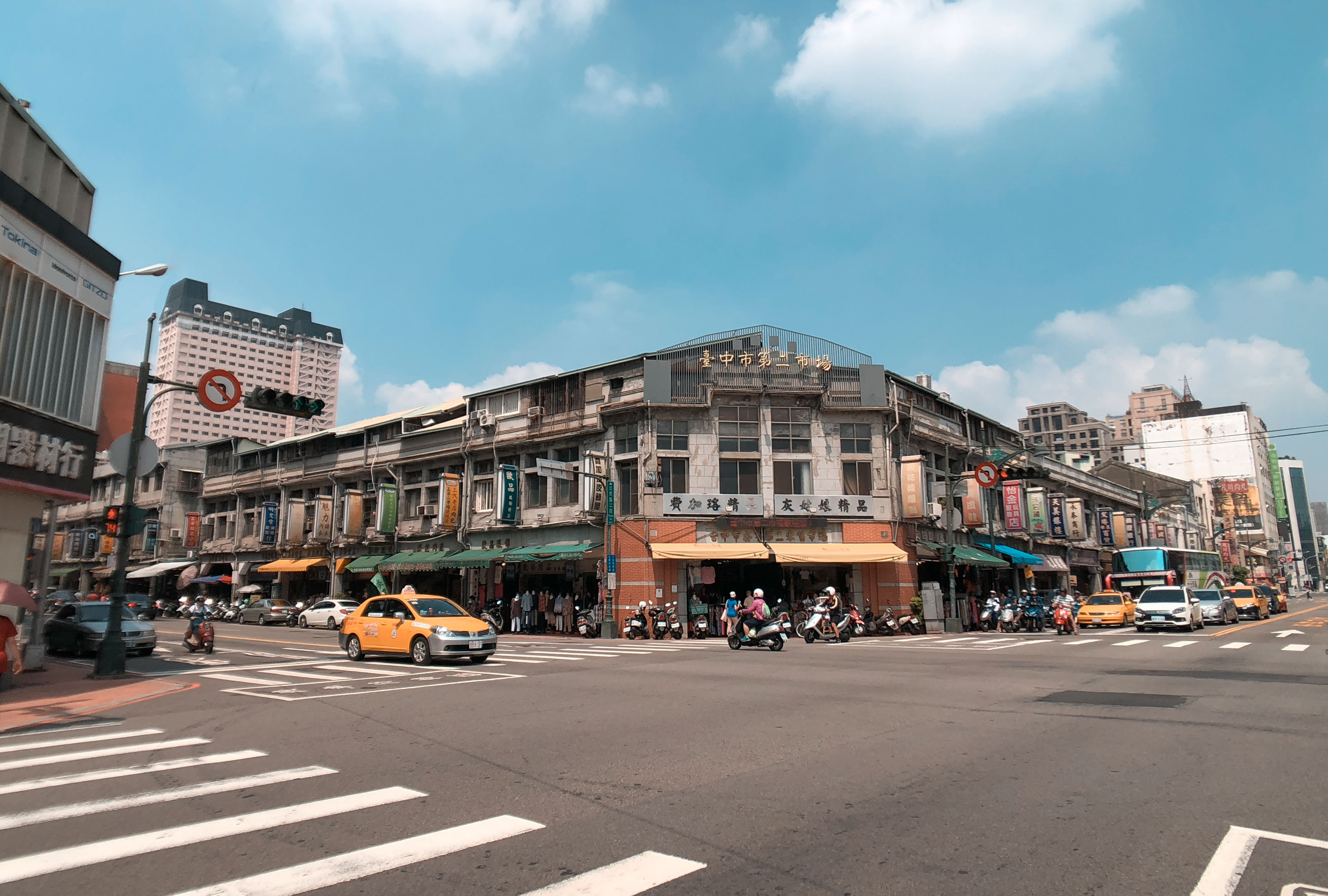
- The market seen from the corner of Taiwan Blvd. and Sanmin Rd.
- Interactive map of the Taichung City Second Market area
- Former names: Shintomichō Market

General information
- Type: Public market
- Location: Central District, Taichung, Taiwan
- Coordinates: 24.1423°N 120.6787°E
- Current tenants: 331 vendors
- Opened: 1917

Technical details
- Size: 2,388 ping (7,894 m^{2}, 84,970 sq ft)

Taichung City Second Market (Chinese: 臺中市第二市場; pinyin: Táizhōngshì Dì'èr Shìchǎng), formerly Shintomichō Market, is a public market located in Central District, Taichung, Taiwan that is known for its local cuisine.

== History ==
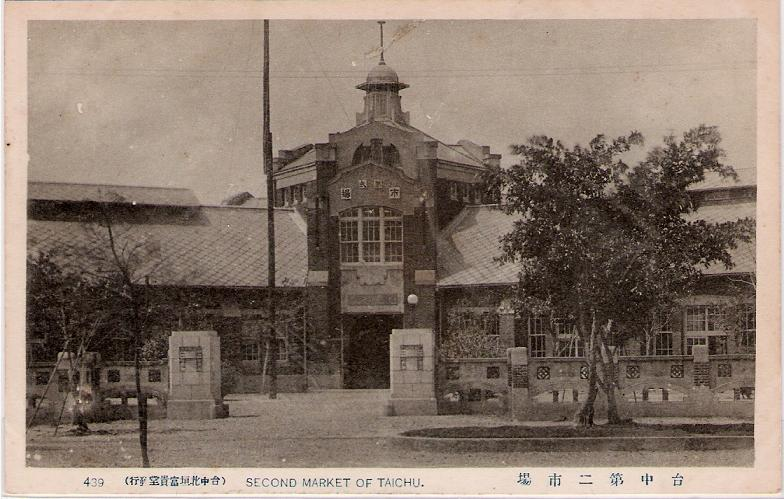
Second Market during the Japanese era. Note the absence of other buildings in front of the entrance.

Taichung City Second Market was built in 1917 by the Japanese colonial government as the second out of five planned marketplaces in Taichung. Like the first market (currently ASEAN Square), the Second Market was built with three wings extending radially from the center. The market was located in Shintomichō, whose residents were mostly Japanese; hence, it was known as the "Japanese market". The Second Market sold higher-end food and clothing for its affluent customers. During this time, the market also sold fruit and vegetables wholesale.

The market was already too small during the Japanese era, and the trend worsened when the Kuomintang took over. Therefore, additional buildings were built around the original and completely surrounded it. However, the market's commercial importance diminished with the westward shift of the city's central business district, the arrival of department stores, and the construction of public markets specifically for wholesale fruit and vegetables.

In the late 20th century, the market transitioned into a tourist attraction known for its wide offerings of Taiwanese cuisine. Renovation projects also helped improve the "dirty" public image of the market. One stall selling ba-wan inside the market is mentioned in the Michelin Guide.

== Architecture ==
The market has a total floor space of 2,388 ping and has a total of 331 vendors inside (54 stores, 150 permanent stalls, 107 temporary stalls). The market is composed of a Japanese-era structure with three wings surrounded by street-facing qilou on all sides. The original Japanese building is built of brick, a style popular during the Taishō era. In the middle of the three wings, there is a two-story hexagonal tower, which was once the tallest structure in Taichung and had a bell serving as a fire alarm. There are six hallways extending from the center in a radial fashion.

== Gallery ==
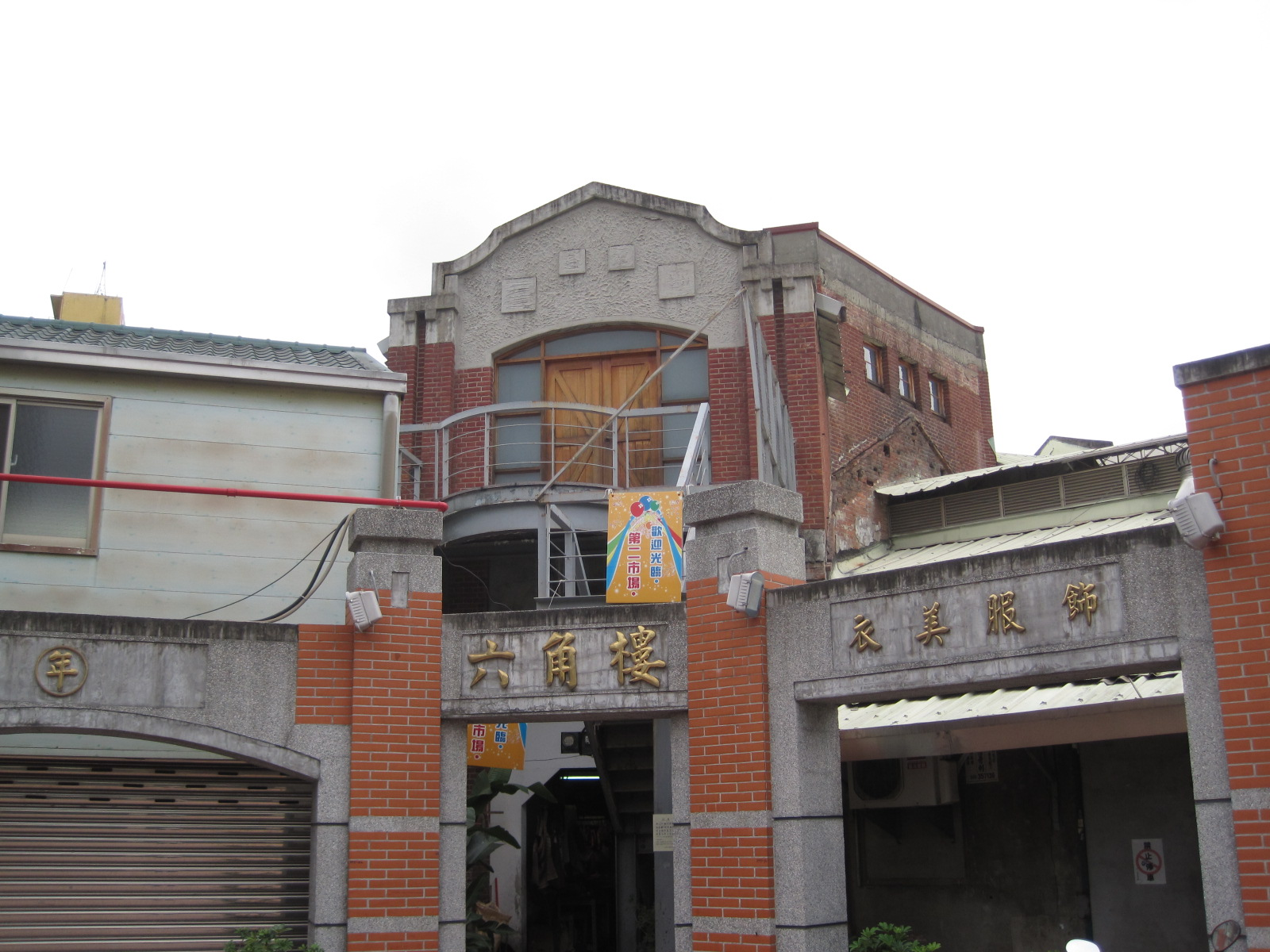
The hexagonal central tower

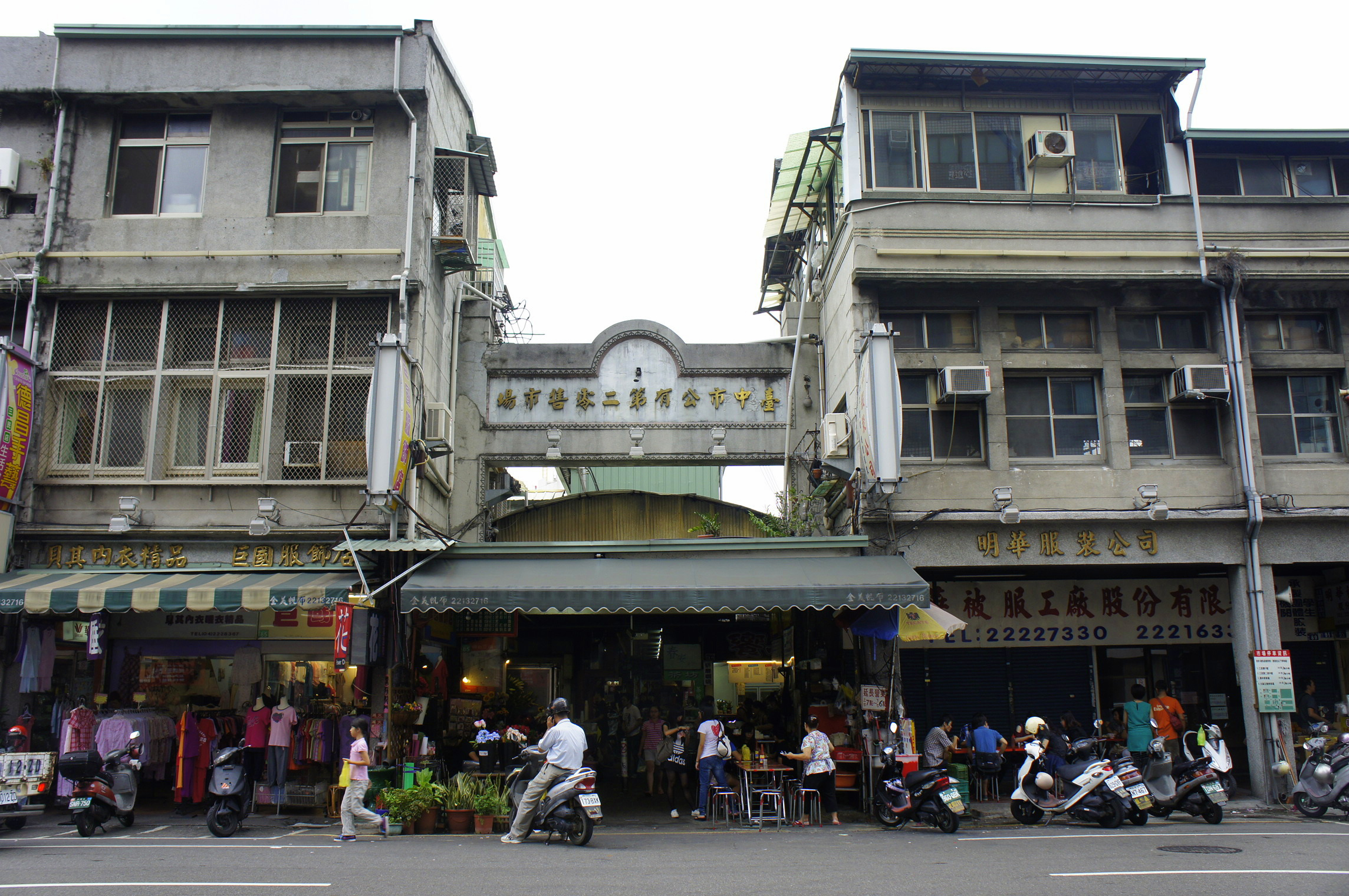
A side entrance to the market

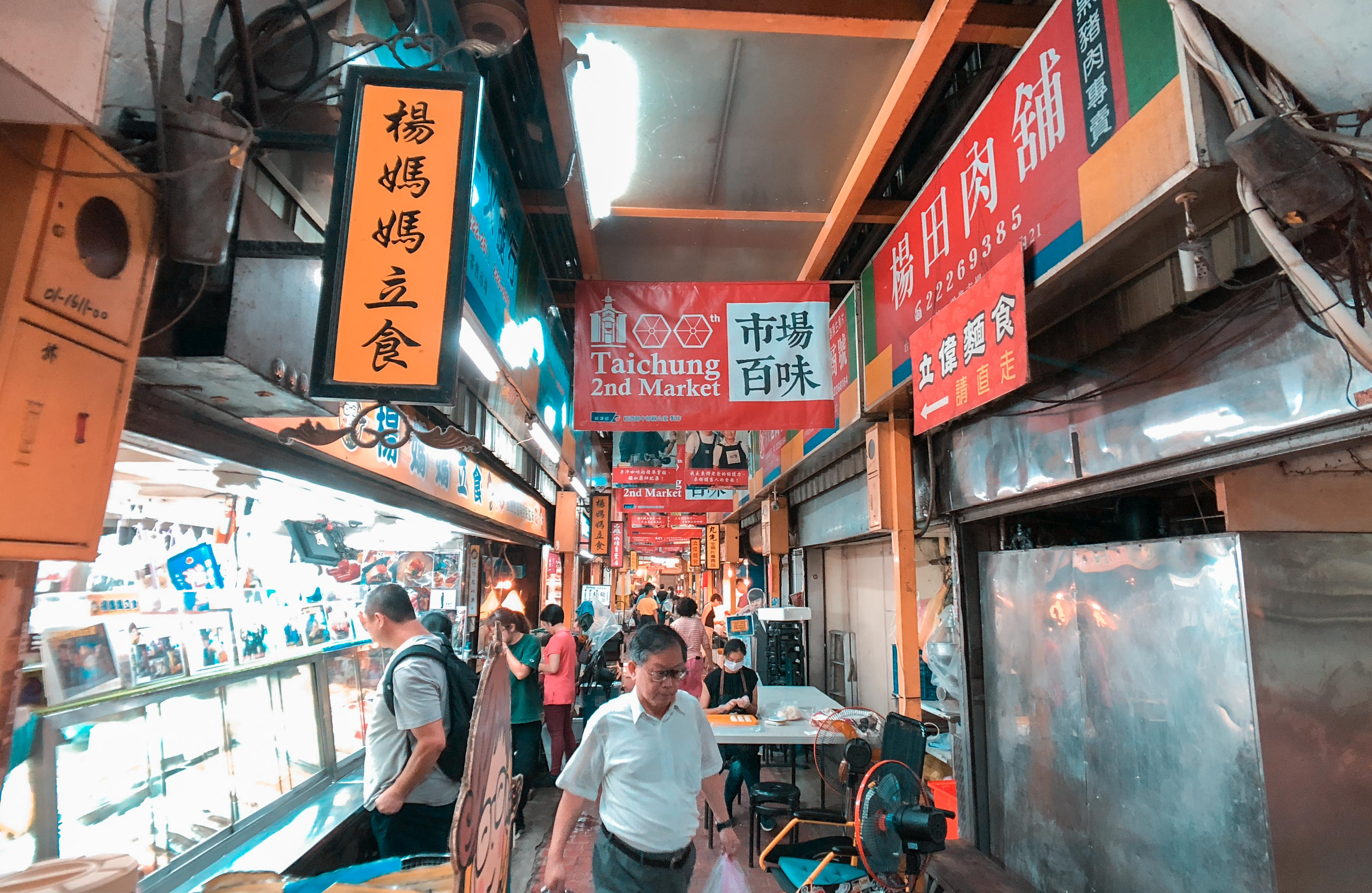
One of the walkways within the market

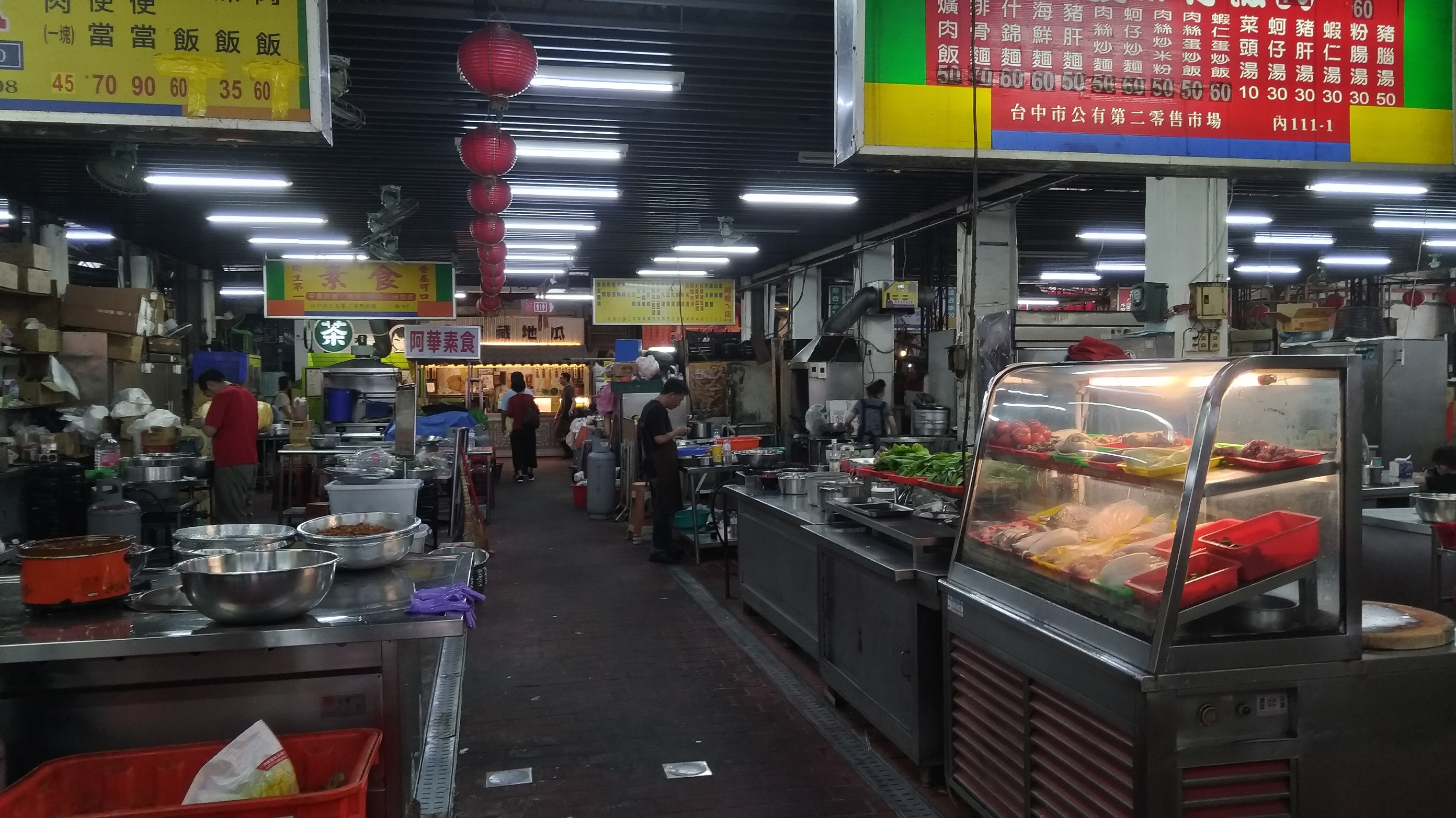
Food vendors in the market

== See also ==
- Miyahara Ice Cream
