= Su Shao-lien =

Taiwanese poet

Su Shao-lien (Chinese: 蘇紹連; born December 8, 1949) is a poet from Shalu District, Taichung City, Taiwan, primarily using the pen name Milo Casso (米羅．卡索). Su has been actively involved in the online literary community, leaving behind numerous discussed works through avant-garde and experimental digital poetry.

== Career ==
Su Shao-lien has managed a personal blog for an extended period. Currently, he serves as the editor-in-chief of The Blow Drum Blow Poetry Forum of Taiwan Poetry. Su has undertaken various poetic experiments, exploring different techniques, forms, interfaces, and modes of expression. His approaches include reworking classical poetry, exploring self-fragmentation, and experimenting with the exchange between subject and object. In terms of form, he delves into prose poetry and mixes Taiwanese and Mandarin languages. His poetry spans various mediums, transitioning from traditional paper to the digital realm of the Internet. His expressions encompass text, imagery, sound, and hypermedia, and he used Flash for his digital poetry.

Su Shao-lien co-founded the Hou Poetry Society (後社) with Hung Hsing-Fu (洪醒夫) and others in 1968. However, it was not until 1969 that his first poem, "Looking Around in Confusion" (茫顧), was published on the recommendation of Chou Meng-tieh (周夢蝶), marking the beginning of his career as a poet. In 1972, he reorganized the Hou Poetry Society, published a poetry journal, and renamed it Poet Quarterly (詩人季刊) in 1974. In the 1990s, he, along with Xiang Ming and others, founded Poetics Quarterly (詩學季刊).

Using the pen name Milo Casso, Su Shao-lien founded the webpages "The Taiwan Poetry Soil” and Modern Poetry Islands (现代诗的岛屿) in 1998, initiating his creation of internet poetry. In 2000, he established a personal hypertext work website called "Flash Hyperliterature" (Flash超文學). Additionally, in 2003, he founded “The Blow Drum Blow Poetry Forum of Taiwan Poetry” website. His works include Collection of Boundlessness (茫茫集) and Startling Prose Poetry (驚心散文詩).
