= Blue line (Taichung MRT) =

Rapid transit line under construction in Taiwan

Overview
- Native name: 臺中捷運藍線
- Status: Under construction
- Locale: Taichung, Taiwan
- Termini: Port of Taichung; New Jianguo Market
- Stations: 20

Service
- Type: Rapid transit
- System: Taichung MRT

History
- Planned opening: 2034

Technical
- Line length: 24.8 kilometres (15.4 mi)
- Number of tracks: 2
- Character: Underground, elevated
- Track gauge: 1,435 mm (4 ft 8 1/2 in) standard gauge

The Blue line of the Taichung MRT is a rapid transit line under construction in Taichung, scheduled to open in 2034.

== Route description ==
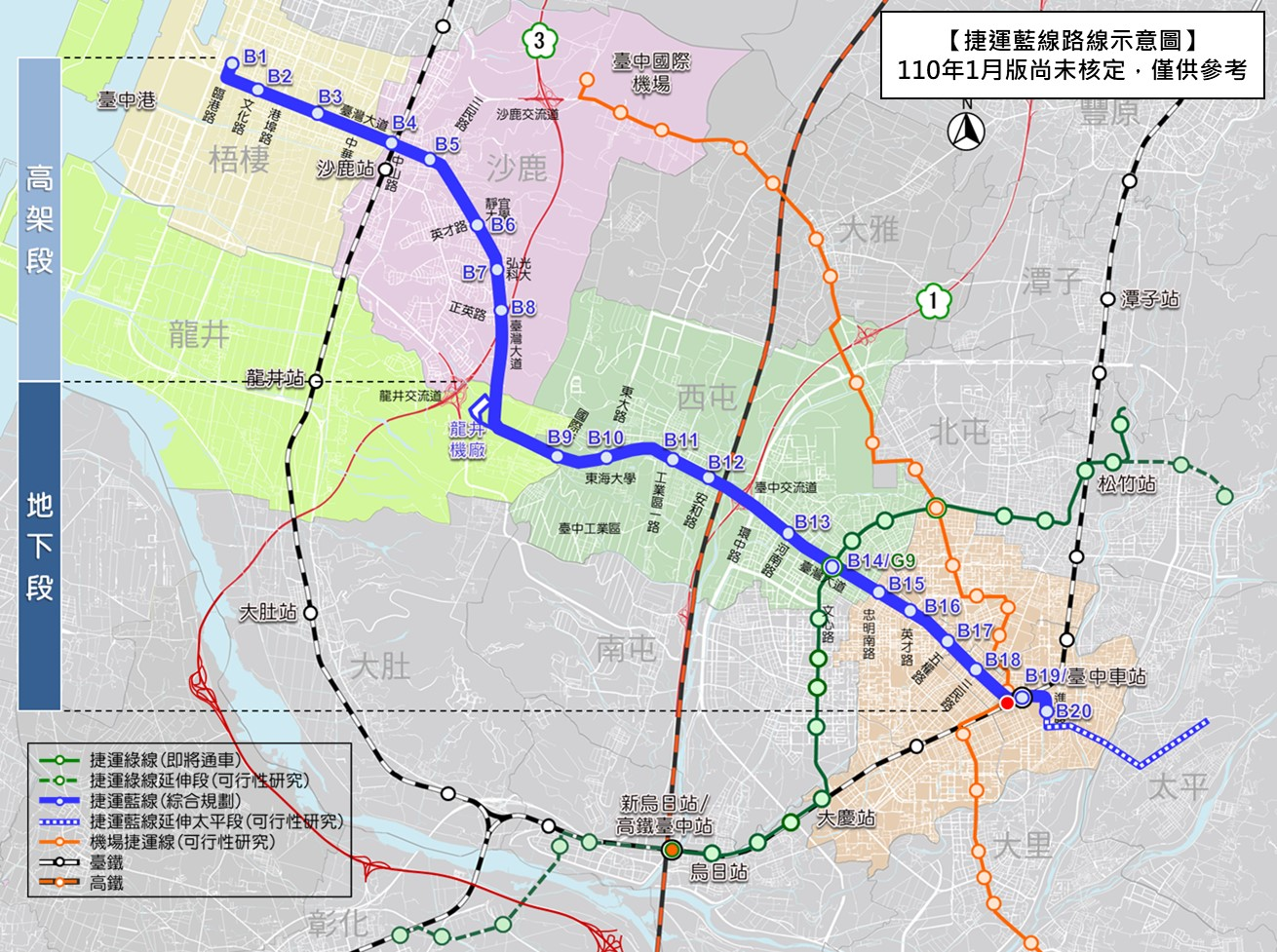
Route map of Taichung MRT Blue line ver. 2021 Jan

The Blue line will begin at the Port of Taichung and follows Taiwan Boulevard for its entire length until it reaches Taichung railway station. Then it will cross the railway tracks and terminate in the East District at the Jianguo Market. The tracks will be elevated from the Port of Taichung until the border of Longjing District and Xitun District, where the tracks continue underground. The depot will be located in Longjing District near the Longjing Interchange of National Freeway 3.

== History ==
The planning of network of rapid transit in Taichung was initially started in 1990s. A prototype of rapid transit line running on Taiwan Boulevard (then known as Zhonggang Road) was first proposed in 1998, along with the current Green line and a third Red line, but never progressed past the planning stage.

During his mayoralty, Lin Chia-lung continued to advocate for a rapid transit line along the route. In October 2018, the Executive Yuan approved the feasibility study submitted by the Taichung City Government. In 2019, the line embarked on its overall planning phase with an estimated cost of $128.56 billion NTD.

In February 2021, the Lu Shiow-yen government completed a new comprehensive planning proposal with differences from the original feasibility study submitted by the Lin Chia-lung government. The depot was moved from the Port of Taichung to Longjing, along with the addition of new stations and changes to the route alignments.

The new proposal for the Blue line was approved by the Ministry of Transportation and Communications in late January 2024. Construction was expected to take ten years, and cost NT$161.51 billion, of which of which NT$67.56 billion was to be funded by the Executive Yuan. The planned Blue line is to start at the Port of Taichung, travel eastward through Shalu and Xitun, before terminating in central Taichung.

On April 29, 2025, the Taichung City Government announced that the Blue line would begin electromechanical construction in June of that year, with urban planning work completing by the end of the year. Construction officially began on June 26, 2025.
