= Miyahara Ice Cream =

Confectionery in Central, Taichung, Taiwan

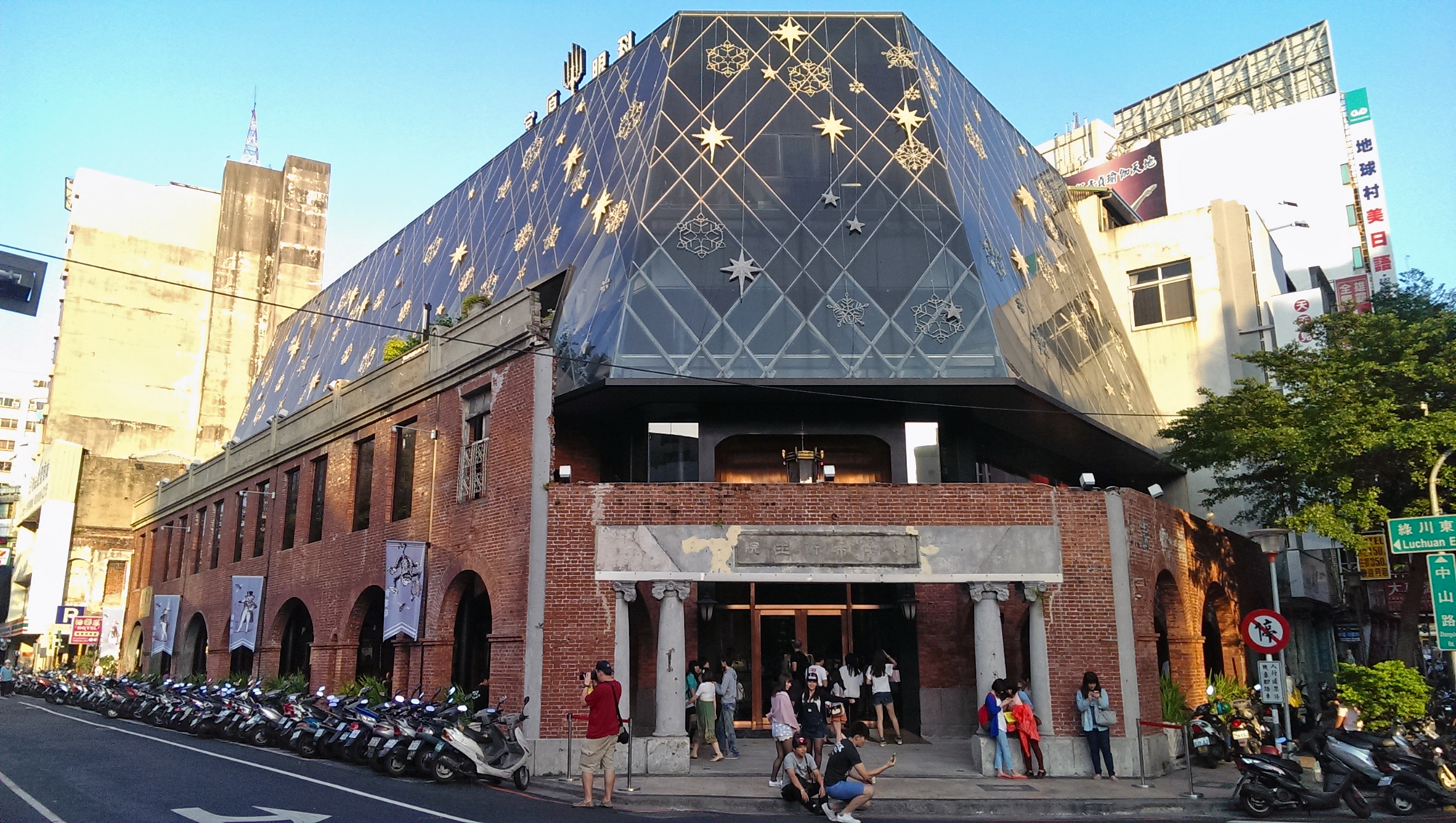
- Interactive map of Miyahara Ice Cream

Restaurant information
- Established: 2012
- Food type: Confectionery
- Location: No. 20, Zhongshan Rd., Central District, Taichung, 400002, Taiwan
- Coordinates: 24°08′16.2″N 120°41′00.7″E
- Website: www.miyahara.com.tw

Miyahara Ice Cream (Chinese: 宮原眼科; pinyin: Gōngyuán Yǎnkē; lit. 'Miyahara eye clinic') is a confectionery, restaurant, and ice cream parlor in Central District, Taichung, Taiwan. The building is converted from a former ophthalmologist clinic dating to 1927, hence its Chinese name. The building is operated by Dawncake (日出), a Taichung-based confectionery brand.

== History ==
Takekuma Miyahara was born on December 13, 1874, in Chiran, Kagoshima Prefecture. As doctoral graduate of LMU Munich and the Institute of Infectious Diseases in Japan, Miyahara owned clinics in Kagoshima City and Tokyo, and briefly worked at Tainan Hospital as the ophthalmology director.

In 1927, Miyahara opened a clinic in Taichung on the banks of the Lu River. At the time, it was the largest eye clinic in the city. Miyahara continued to operate the clinic until the end of the Japanese occupation of Taiwan in 1945, where he returned to Japan; the building was then used by the Taichung City Health Bureau. Wanting to move to a bigger building but lacking the funds to do so, the bureau came to an agreement with local businessman Zhang Ruizhen (張瑞楨): Zhang would finance the construction of the new expansion in exchange for the old building. The bureau moved to its new location in 1959, near the current Taichung Hospital.

Afterwards, the building was occupied by a wide range of tenants, including a clinic for sexually transmitted infections, a cram school, a dumpling restaurant, a hairdresser, two taxi and bus dispatch companies, and more. After several disagreements, Zhang forcefully evicted the tenants in 1964, and in 1970 the building was used as an office for the newspaper Taiwan Daily. The building sustained heavy damage in the 1999 Jiji earthquake and the 2008 Typhoon Kalmaegi, and after the typhoon, the building was in ruins and abandoned.

In 2010, Dawncake purchased the ruins, and over the next two years, refurbished the building into a restaurant. The store opened to the public in 2012. After the success of Miyahara Ice Cream, the Dawncake group also refurbished the nearby Fourth Credit Union, a former bank, in a similar manner.

== Architecture ==
Miyahara Ice Cream is located at the corner of Zhongshan Road and Luchuan East Road, on the banks of the Lu River. It is a four-story structural steel building: the bottom two floors uses the original brick structure as a facade and preserved the building's qilou, and the top two floors is a newly-added space covered by architectural glass in a style similar to a mansard roof. The first floor sells ice cream and various pastries, while the second floor is a Taiwanese cuisine restaurant named "Moon Pavilion", which a "Bib Gourmand" eatery in the Michelin Guide. The atrium in the interior is often paralleled to that of Hogwarts in the Harry Potter franchise.

Miyahara Ice Cream is commonly cited as one of the earliest urban renewal projects in Central District in the 2010s.

== Gallery ==
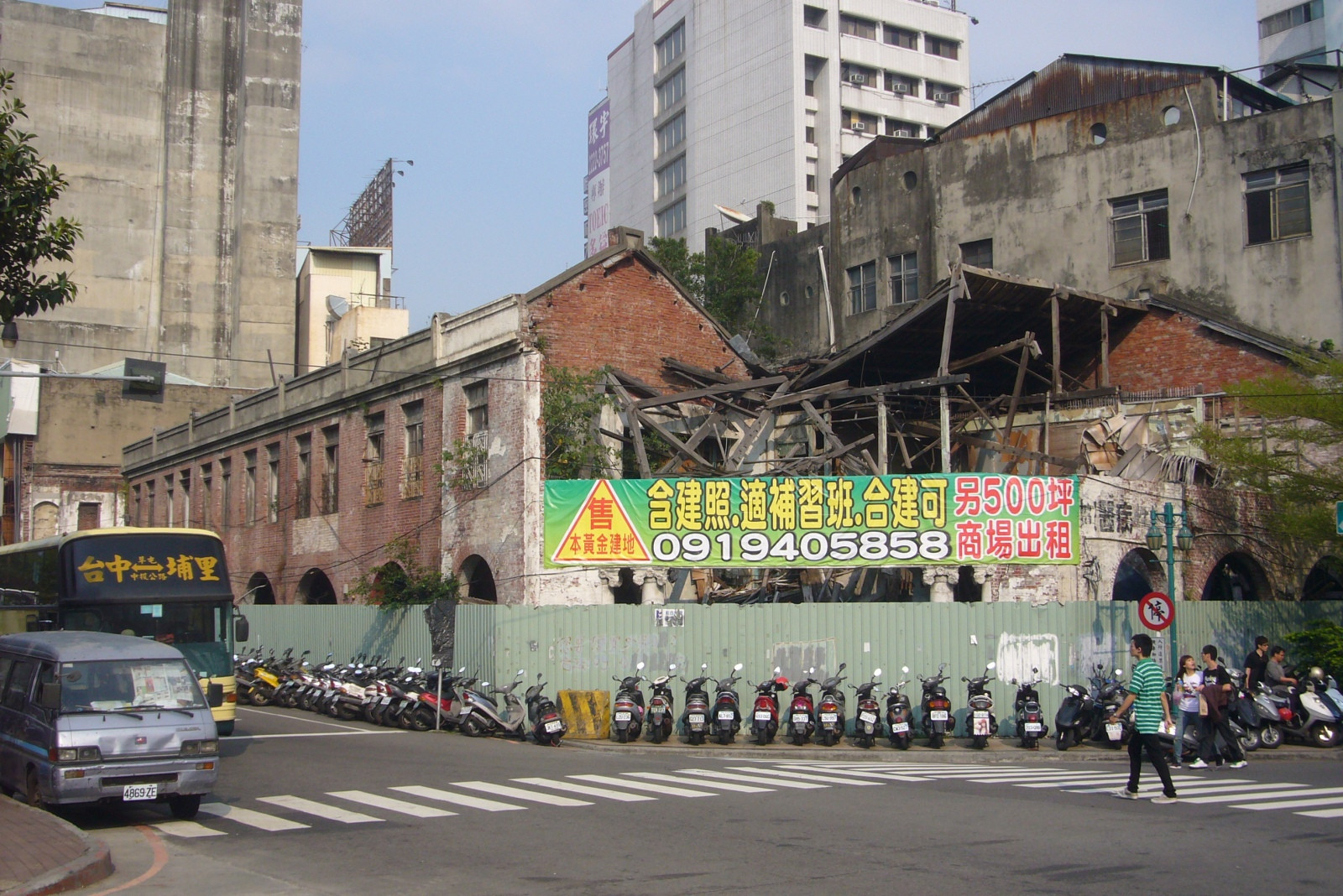
The building in 2010, prior to its renovation. The green banner is an advertisement to sell the land.

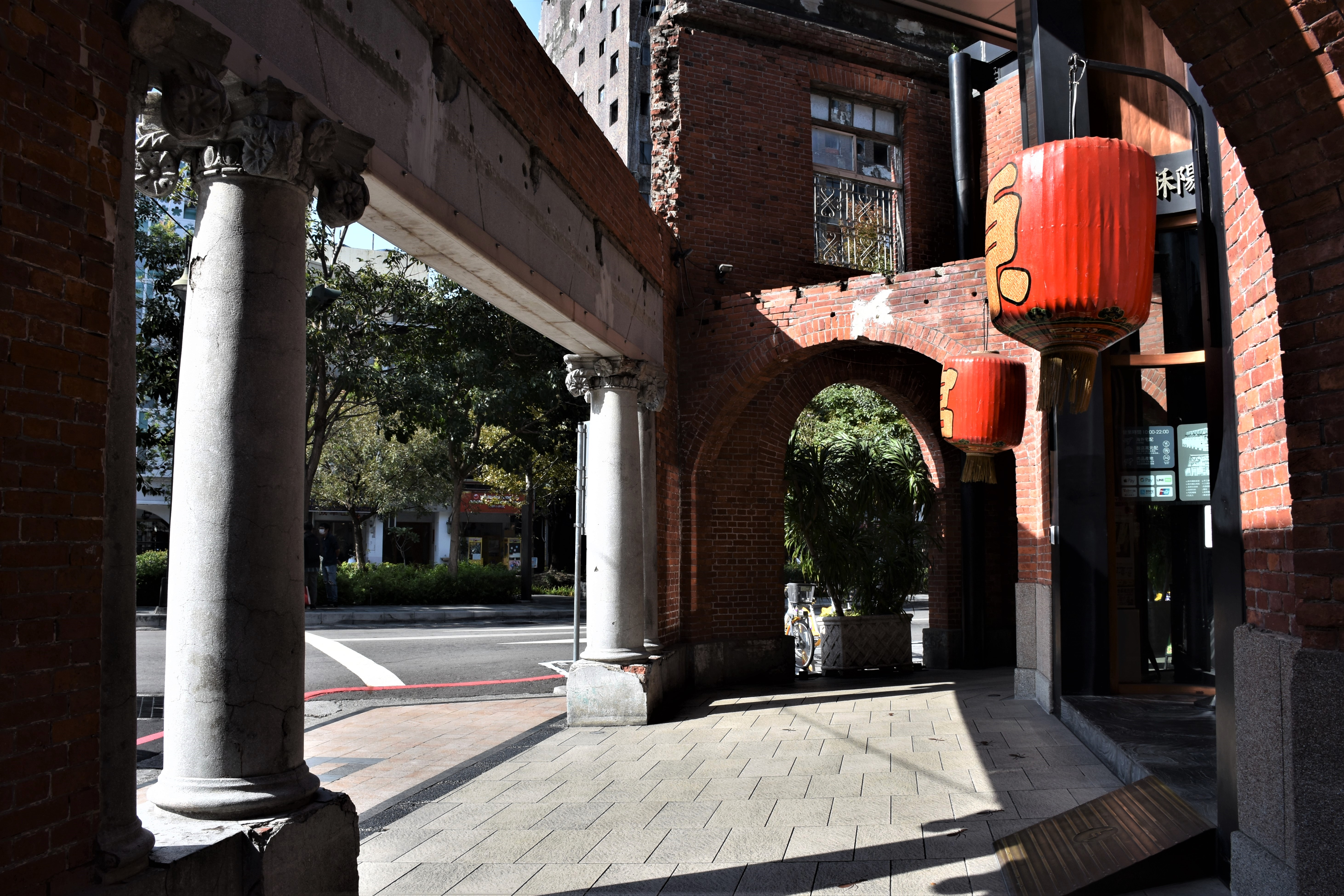
Front entrance to Miyahara Ice Cream, showing its preserved brick structure.

== See also ==
- Taichung City Second Market
