= Central Bookstore =

Bookstore in Central, Taichung, Taiwan

- 中央書局
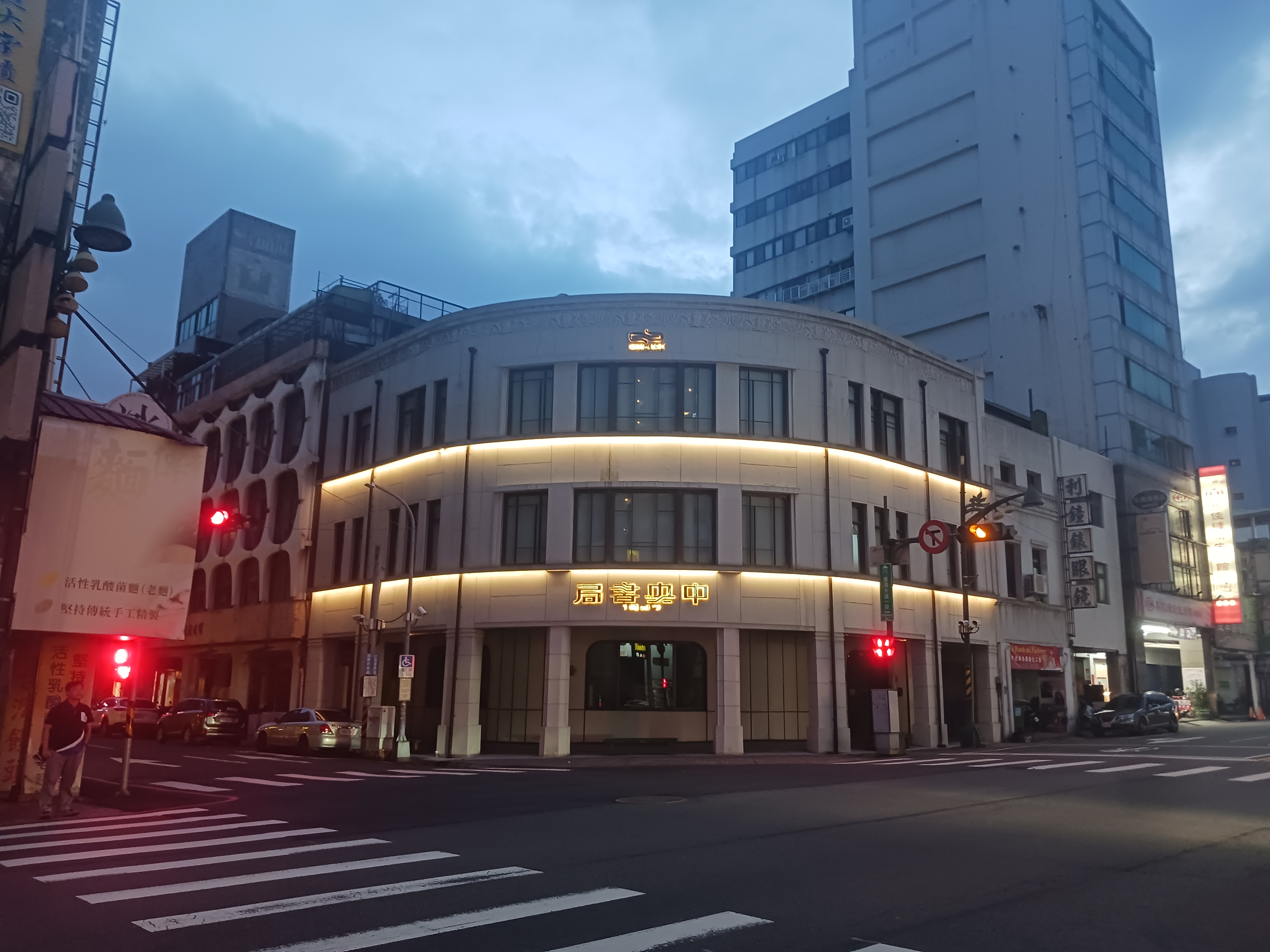
- Interactive map of the Central Bookstore area

General information
- Type: bookstore
- Location: Central, Taichung, Taiwan
- Coordinates: 24°08′26.9″N 120°40′52.1″E
- Opened: 3 January 1927

Technical details
- Floor count: 3

The Central Bookstore (traditional Chinese: 中央書局; simplified Chinese: 中央书局; pinyin: Zhōngyāng Shūjú) is a bookstore in Central District, Taichung, Taiwan.

== History ==
=== Empire of Japan ===
The bookstore was originally opened on 3 January 1927 by Taiwanese Cultural Association as a meeting venue for pro-democracy and self-rule movement as a branch of the Central Club. The first and second floor housed selected Mainland Chinese, Japanese and Western books. It also served as the venue for the public to learn about writer Lu Xun and Ba Jin after the May Fourth Movement on 4 May 1919 in Peking. Later the shop caught attention of the government and it was then placed under heavy surveillance.

=== Republic of China ===
After the handover of Taiwan from Japan to the Republic of China in 1945, the shop finally resumed to its normal operation. In the same year, it was later moved to its current building on Taiwan Boulevard which it was used to be used as the store dormitory and warehouse. In 1998, the store was closed due to financial difficulties. Since then, it had been used as wedding dress shop, convenience store and motorcycle helmet store. In 2016, the rights to use the building was obtained by Shang Shan Human Culture Foundation. Since then, the building was renovated and restored as a bookstore again with a cost of NT$20 million. The bookshop was reopened for trial in November 2019 and on 18 October 2020, it was officially reopened in a ceremony attended by Culture Minister Lee Yung-te

== Architecture ==
The bookstore is housed in a 3-story building with a circular shape.

== Transportation ==
The bookstore is accessible within walking distance northeast of Taichung Station of Taiwan Railway.

== See also ==
- Taiwanese literature
