= Miyahara (surname) =

Miyahara (written: 宮原) is a formerly royal Japanese surname. Notable people with the surname include:

- Atsuji Miyahara (宮原 厚次; born 1958), Japanese sport wrestler
- Jeff Miyahara (born 1977), American record producer
- Jon Miyahara (1941–2025), American actor
- Kento Miyahara (宮原 健斗; born 1989), Japanese professional wrestler
- Mieko Miyahara (宮原 美江子; born 1960), Japanese fencer
- Misako Miyahara (宮原 美佐子; born 1962), Japanese long-distance runner
- Nami Miyahara (宮原 永海; born 1978), Japanese singer and voice actress
- Satoko Miyahara (宮原 知子; born 1998), Japanese figure skater
- Takashi Miyahara (宮原 巍; 1934–2019), Nepalese businessman and politician
- Teruhiko Miyahara (宮原 照彦; born 1951), Japanese sport wrestler
- Toshiyuki Miyahara (宮原 利幸; born 1958), Japanese water polo player
- Yu Miyahara (宮原 優), Japanese sport wrestler
- Yuji Miyahara (宮原 裕司; born 1980), Japanese footballer
