= Lyu-Chuan Canal =

Canal in Taichung, Taiwan

Lyu-Chuan Canal 綠川
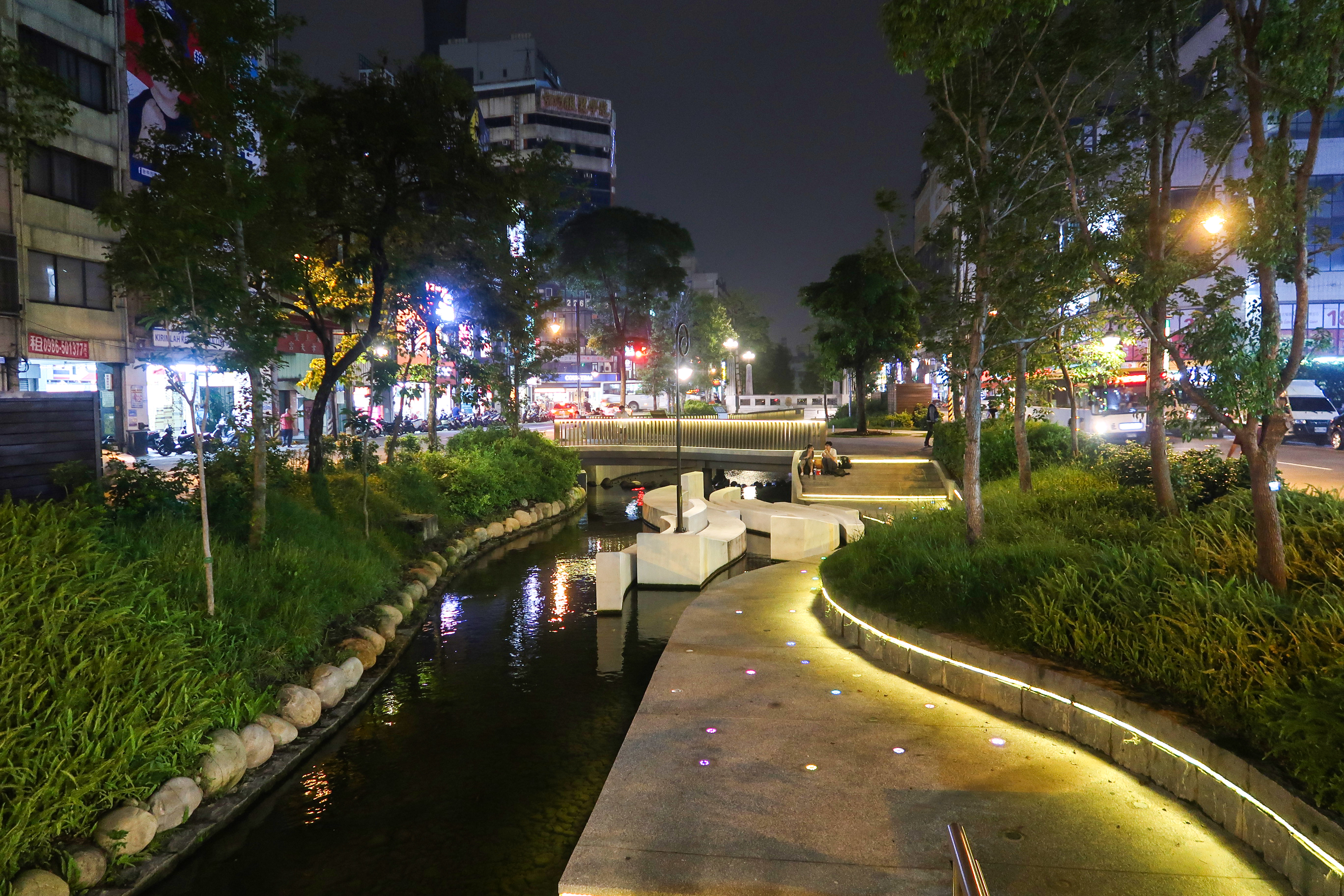
- Interactive map of Lyu-Chuan Canal 綠川

Specifications
- Length: 6.1 km (3.8 miles)

Geography
- Start point: Taichung, Taiwan
- End point: Taichung, Taiwan
- Connects to: Hansi River

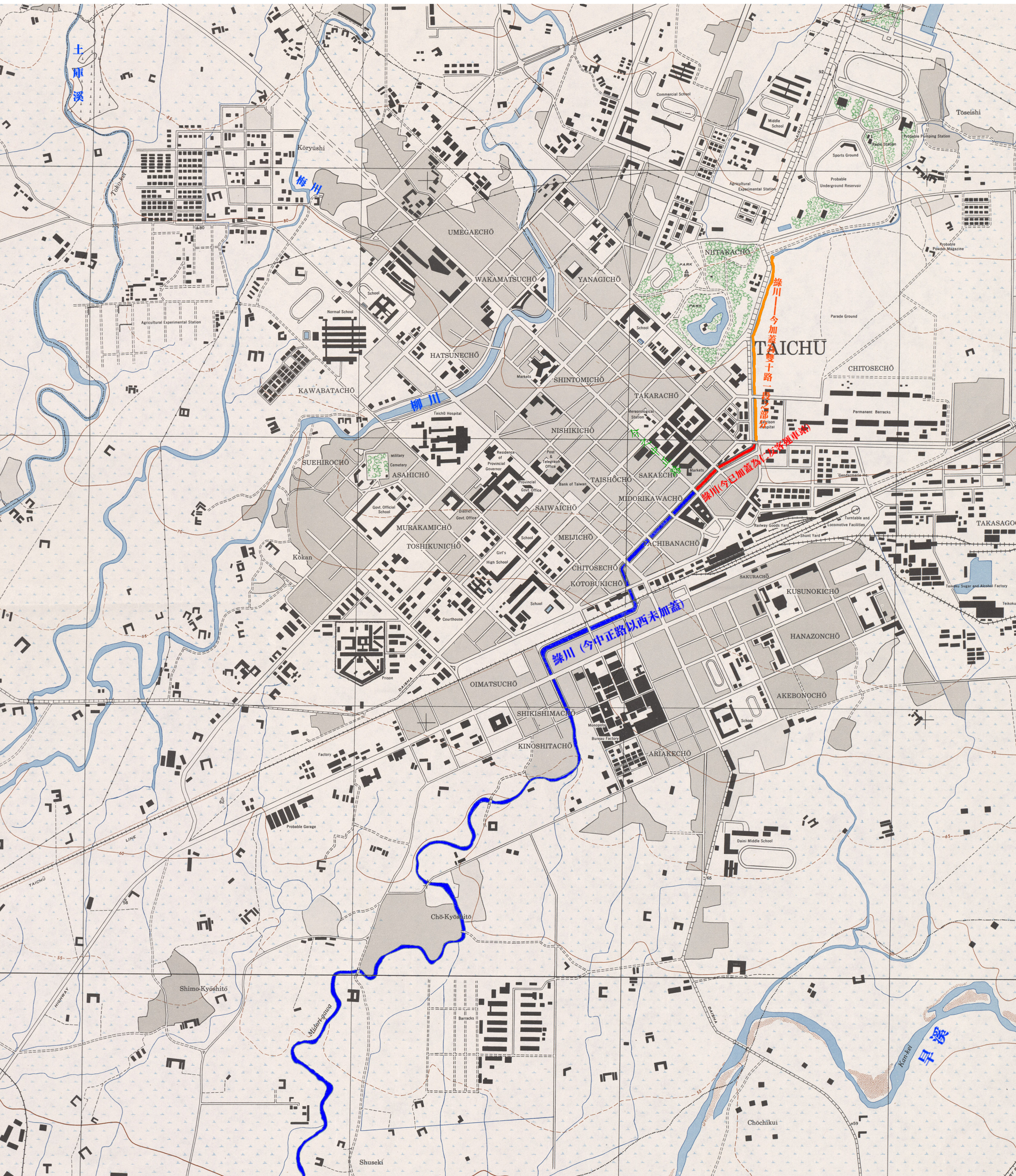
Lyu-Chuan Canal map (dark blue) passing through Taichung

The Lyu-Chuan Canal (Chinese: 綠川; pinyin: Lǜ Chuān) is a canal in Taichung, Taiwan.

== History ==
The canal is the birthplace of the development of Taichung as a city during Japanese colonial era. As time passed by, the canal started to get polluted due to the urban development and industrialization of Taichung in the 1980s. However, since 2014, the Taichung City Government initiated a 17-month project to revitalize the canal, which included works to improve the canal flood mitigation capability, improve the water quality and create a water-friendly environment for the area along the canal. Polluted water is diverted to a nearby Zhonghua water treatment plant to be processed before being released back to the waterway. A 610-meter long walking path was also designed along the canal. The project cost about NT$850 million. The canal was then reopened to the public on 10 February 2018. In the same month, the canal was featured at an exhibition in Taichung, which was promoted as a canal with a trademark, the first of its kind in Taiwan.

== Geology ==
The canal spans over a length of 6.1 km. It is currently being used to regulate the water flow between high flow and low flow seasons.

== Ecology ==
The canal features various species of fish.

== See also ==
- Geography of Taiwan
- Water supply and sanitation in Taiwan
