= Central District, Taichung =

District in Taichung, Taiwan

Central 中區
- District
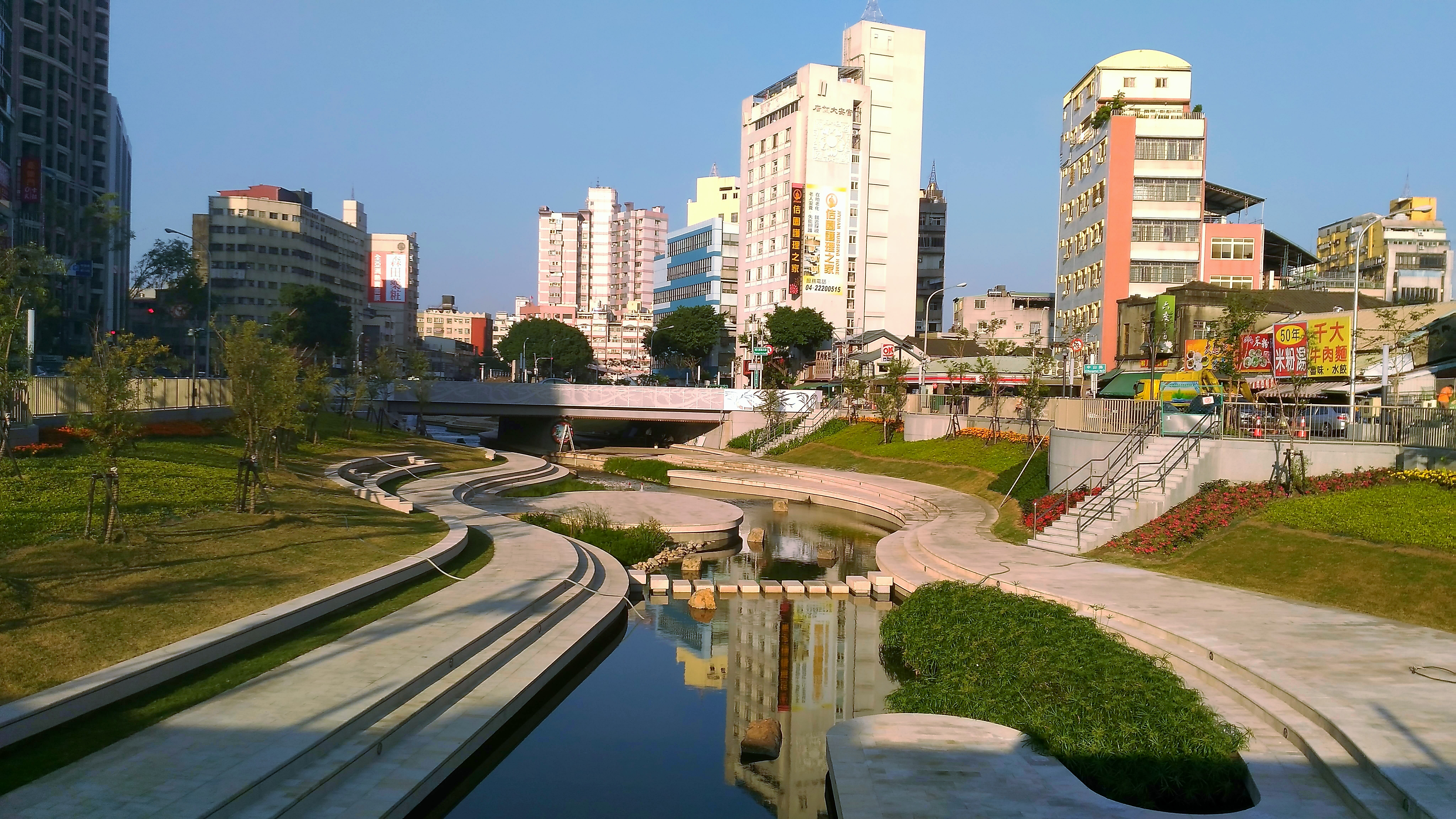

- Central District in Taichung City
- Coordinates: 24.1415°N 120.6805°E
- Country: Taiwan
- Divisions: List: 8 villages; 195 neighborhoods

Government
  - Mayor: 黃至民

Area
  - Total: 0.880 km^{2} (0.340 sq mi)

Population (March 2023)
  - Total: 17,751
  - Rank: 27 out of 29
  - Density: 20,200/km^{2} (52,200/sq mi)
- Postal code: 400
- Website: www.central.taichung.gov.tw (in Chinese)

Central District (Chinese: 中區; pinyin: Zhōng Qū) is an urban district in Taichung City, Taiwan. It is located at the heart of the city, though it has seen decline in recent years as newer districts nearby like Xitun has seen growth. It is the smallest district and township-level subdivision in Taiwan and the only one with an area under 1 km^{2}.

== History ==
Taichung City was first settled in this district. Since the area used to be a swamp, they settled near a small hill known as Dadun (大墩). By the Qing Dynasty this area developed as a prosperous town.

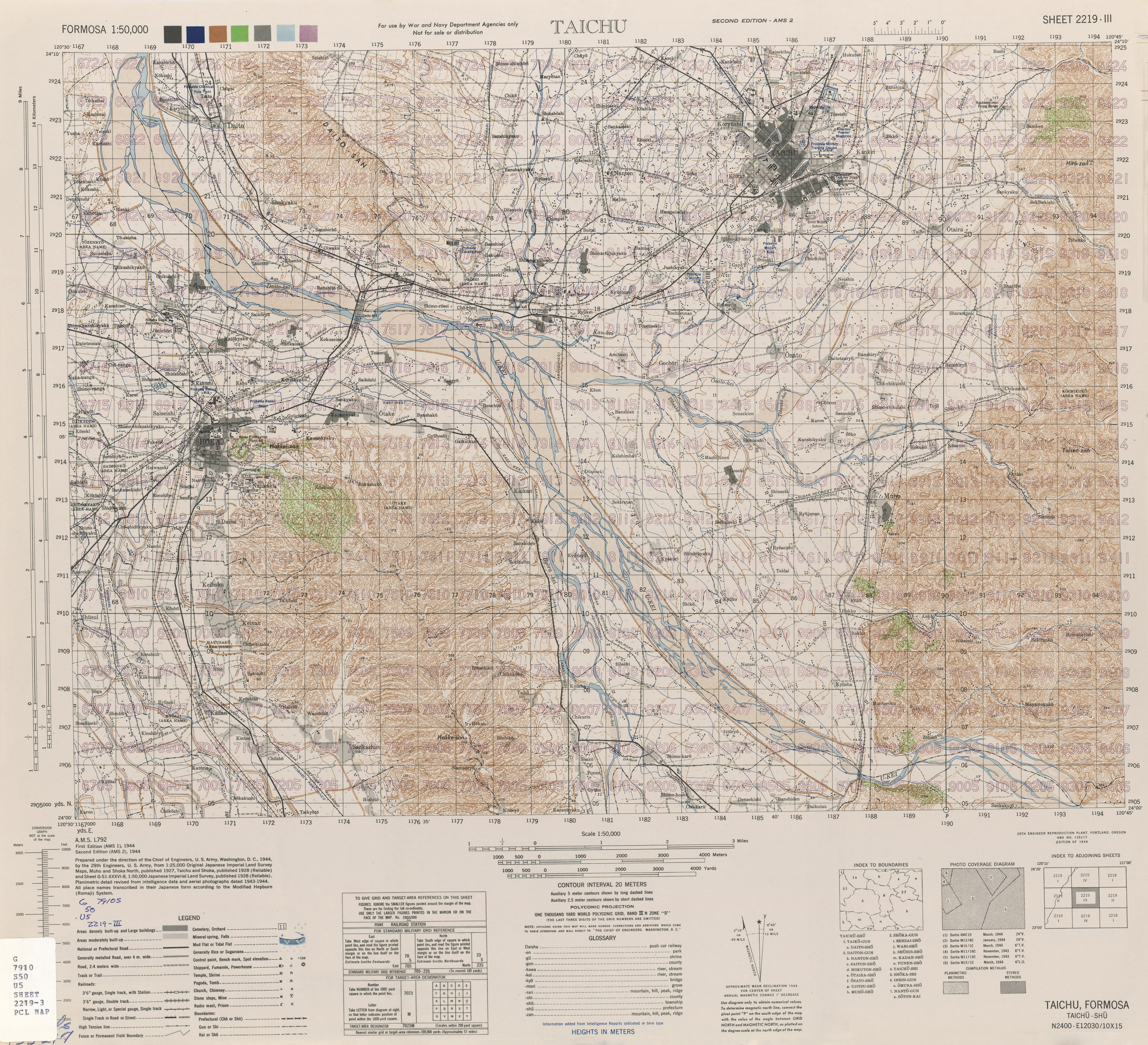
Map of Taichung (labeled as TAICHŪ) and surrounding area (1944)

The area saw mass development in the Japanese era under the supervision of Goto Shinpei. Under the plan created by W. K. Burton and Hamano Yashiro, a grid plan was adopted. The Taichung Train Station was built during this time.

Under the Republic of China, several Japanese districts, which included Tachibana-cho, Midori-cho, Sakae-cho, Taisho-cho, Takara-cho, Nishiki-cho, Shintomi-cho, Yanagi-cho, Hatsune-cho, and Wakamatsu-cho were combined to form Central District.

Central District used to be the heart of all business and commerce in Taichung. However, since the district was planned in the Japanese era, the roads are too tight to accommodate for modern growth. Therefore, the area has seen decline as newer districts like Xitun to the west grew rapidly. In 2010, the Taichung City Hall moved from Central District to Xitun District. There has been recent efforts to renew the city, with local businesses utilizing the historical buildings in the city to create unique shops and restaurants.

== Administrative divisions ==
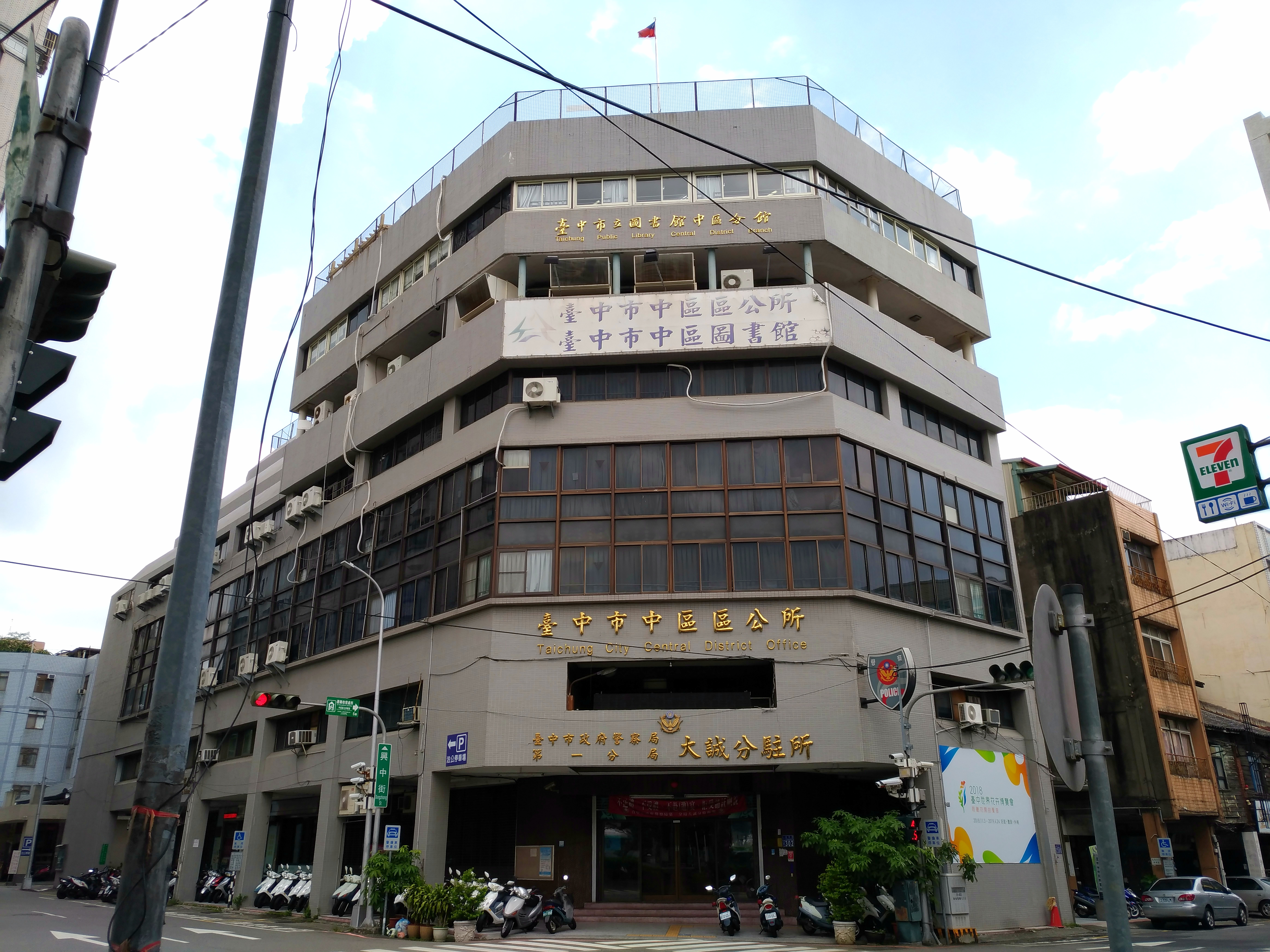
Central District office

English name	Chinese name
Dacheng Village	大誠里
Luchuan Village	綠川里
Jiguang Village	繼光里
Gongyuan Village	公園里
Guangfu Village	光復里
Dadun Village	大墩里
Liuchuan Village	柳川里
Zhonghua Village	中華里

== Tourist attractions ==
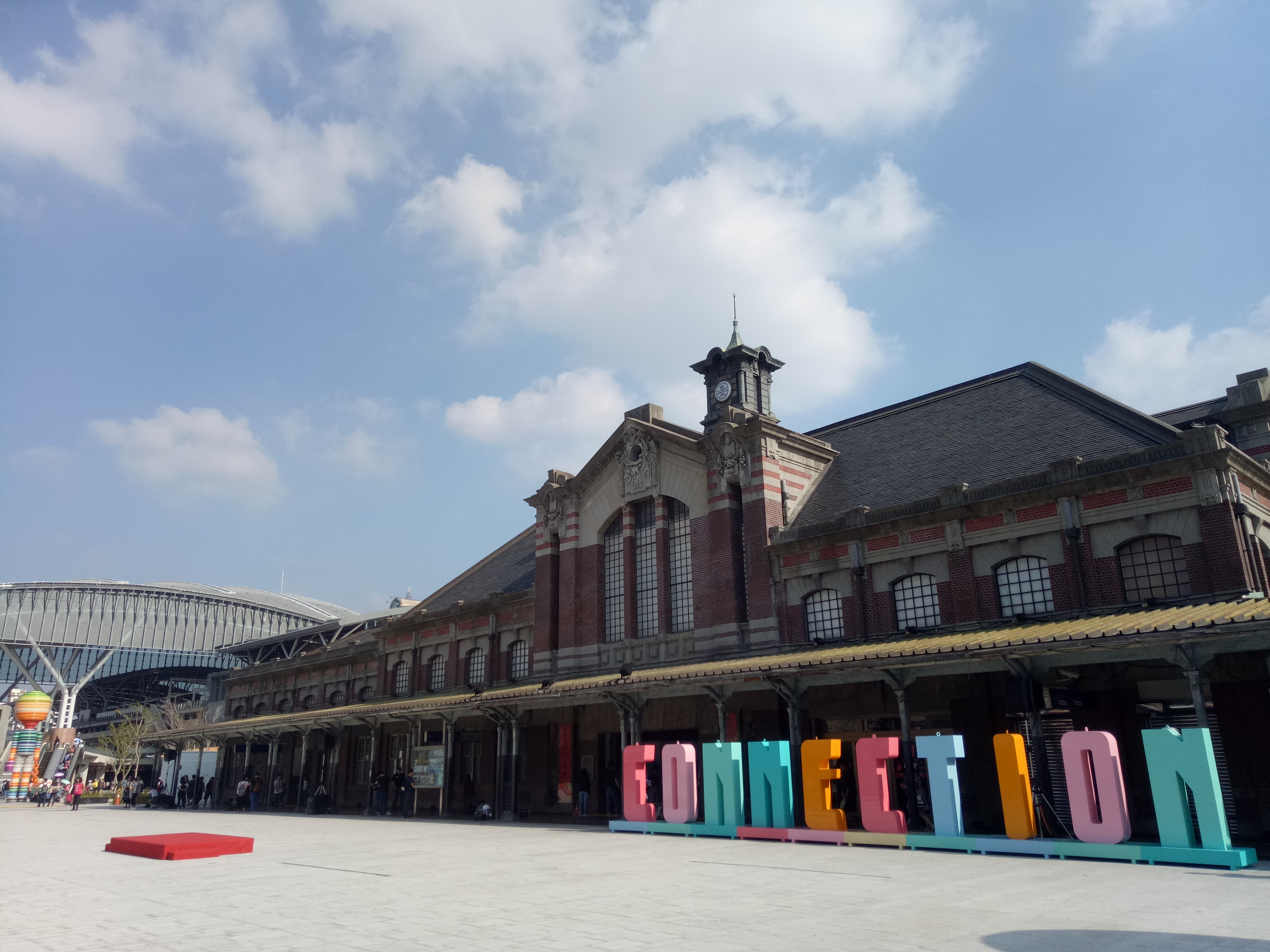
Old Taichung Train Station

- Central Bookstore
- Chang Hwa Bank Headquarters and Museum
- Miyahara Ice Cream
- Old Taichung Train Station
- Taichung City Second Market

== Transportation ==
Central District is served by TR Taichung Station by rail and Provincial Highway 12 by road.

== See also ==
- Taichung
