= Shalu District =

District of Taichung, Taiwan

Shalu 沙鹿區
- District
- Shalu District
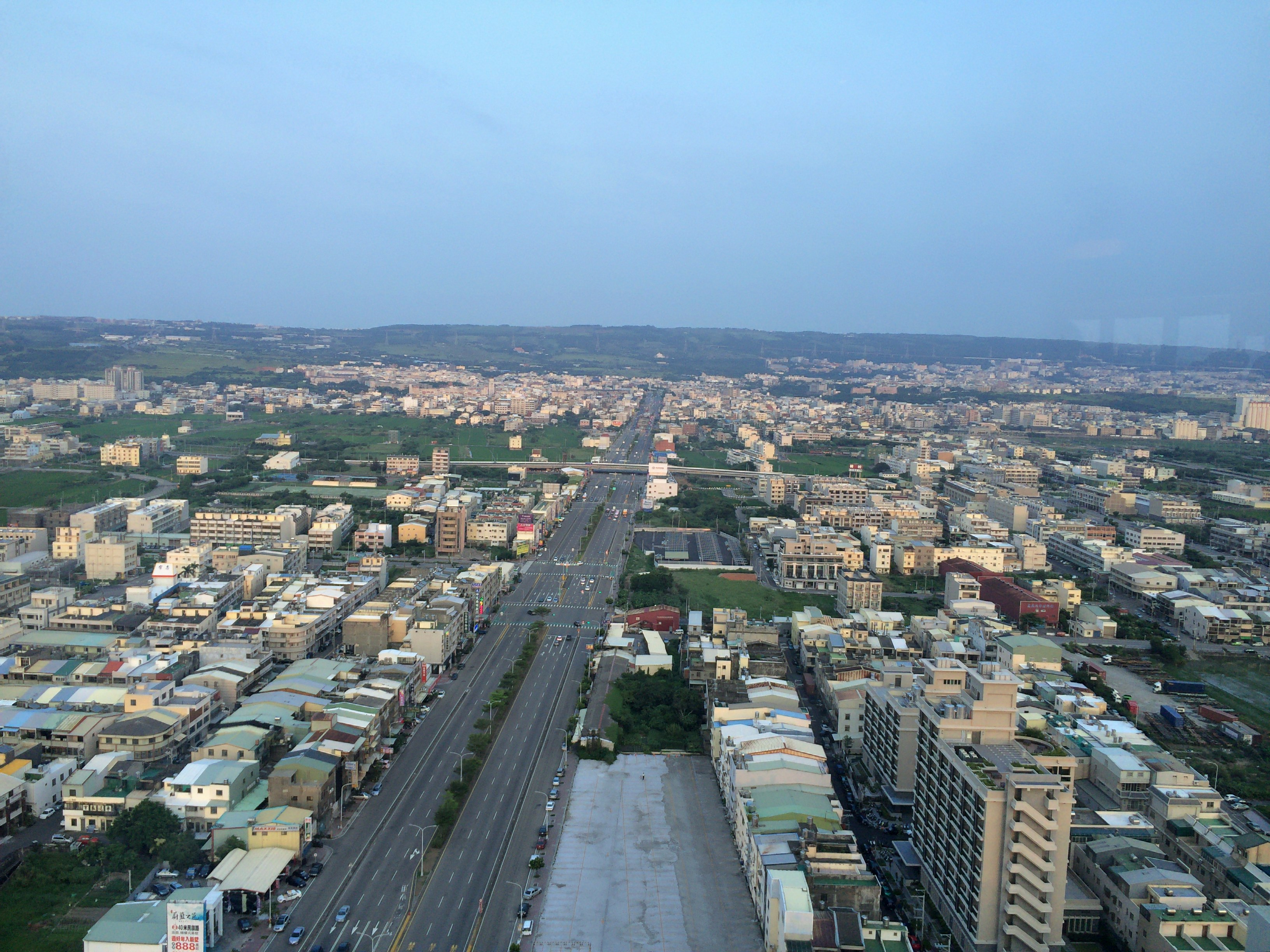

- Shalu District in Taichung City

- Location within Taiwan
- Coordinates: 24°14′21.9″N 120°33′43.6″E
- Location: Taichung, Taiwan

Government
  - Mayor: Liao Tsai-chung (廖財崇; Pe̍h-ōe-jī: Liāu Châi-chông)

Area
  - Total: 40.46 km^{2} (15.62 sq mi)

Population (December 2024)
  - Total: 100,152
  - Rank: 12 out of 29
  - Density: 2,475/km^{2} (6,411/sq mi)
- Website: www.shalu.taichung.gov.tw (in Chinese)

Shalu District (Chinese: 沙鹿區; pinyin: Shālù Qū; Pe̍h-ōe-jī: Sa-lak-khu; lit: Sand Deer) is a suburban district in central Taichung City, Taiwan.

== History ==
Originally a settlement of the Papora people, this region was named Chinese: 沙轆社; Pe̍h-ōe-jī: Sa-lak-siā. During the Kingdom of Tungning (1662－1683), the Taiwanese Plains Aborigines were driven away or sinicized, and the area became a Han settlement. In 1731 during Qing rule, Tamsui Subprefecture (Chinese: 淡水廳; Pe̍h-ōe-jī: Tām-chúi-thiaⁿ) extended from the Tai-kah River northward up to Kelang (Chinese: 雞籠; Pe̍h-ōe-jī: Ke-lang; Keelung).

In 1920, during Japanese rule, the written name was changed to Sharoku (沙鹿). Administratively, Sharoku was under Taikō District (大甲郡), Taichū Prefecture. In Taiwanese Hokkien, the old name (Soa-la̍k) is still used.

In 1945 the village was changed to a township, and was upgraded to a district in 2010.

== Administrative divisions ==
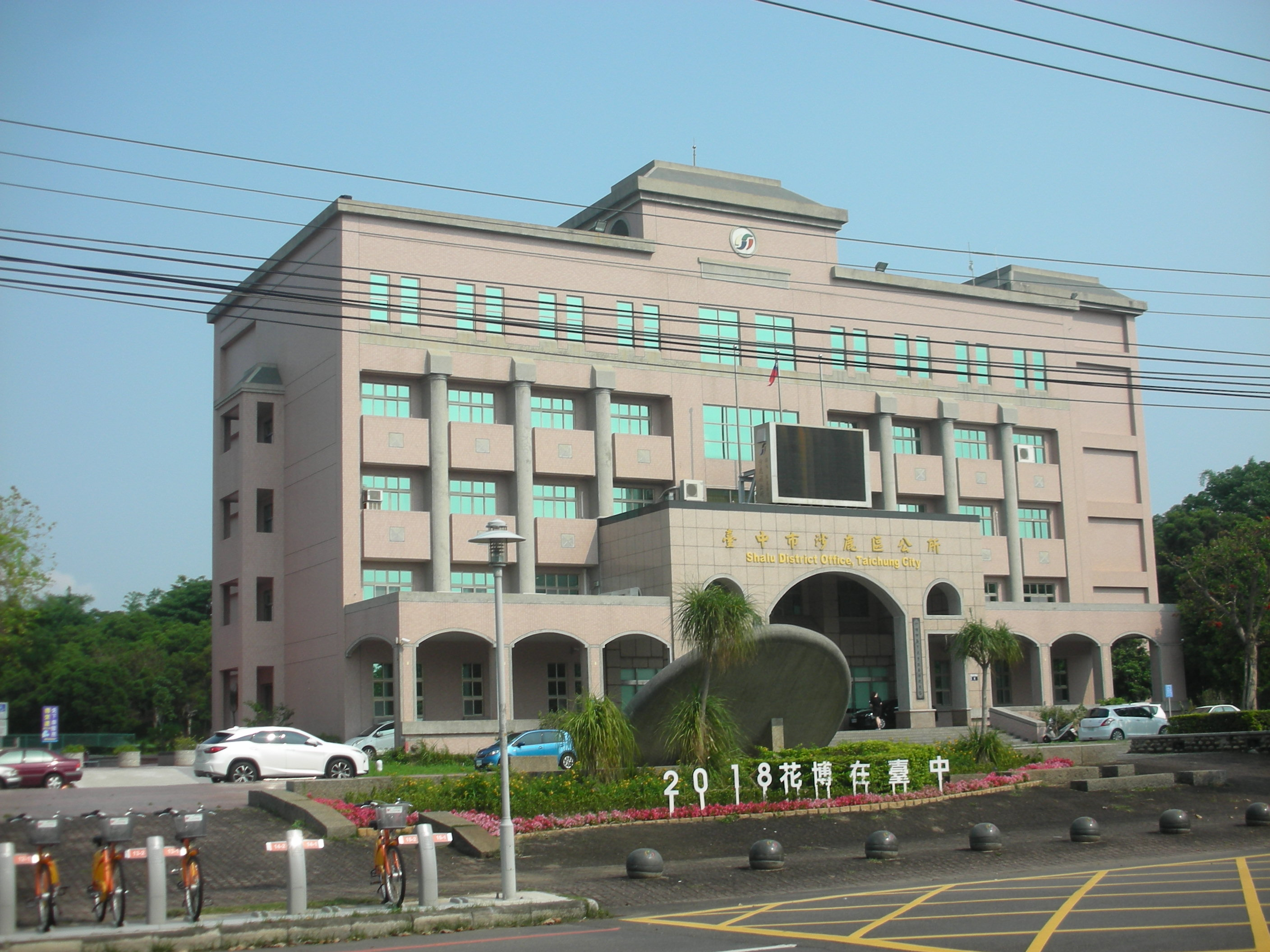
Shalu District Office

Juren, Luoquan, Shalu, Meiren, Xingren, Xingan, Doudi, Lufeng, Luliao, Zhulin, Lifen, Fuxing, Beishi, Jinjiang, Liulu, Nanshi, Puzi, Sanlu, Gongming, Qingquan and Xishi Village.

== Native products ==
- Pork and products
- Peanuts

== Education ==
- Hungkuang University
- Providence University

== Tourist attractions ==
- Kang Chu Sports Park
- Lufeng Night Market
- Jingyi Night Market
- Gongming Night Market

== Transportation ==
=== Airport ===
- Taichung International Airport

=== Railway stations ===
- Shalu Station

=== Roads ===
- Freeway 3
- Provincial Highway 10
- Provincial Highway 10B
- Provincial Highway 12

== Notable natives ==
- Hung Tzu-yung, member of Legislative Yuan (2016–2020)
- Su Shao-lien, poet
- Yen Ching-piao, member of Legislative Yuan (2002–2012)
- Yen Kuan-heng, member of Legislative Yuan (2013–2020)

== See also ==
- Taichung
