= Taichung railway station =

Railway station located in Taichung

Taichung 臺中
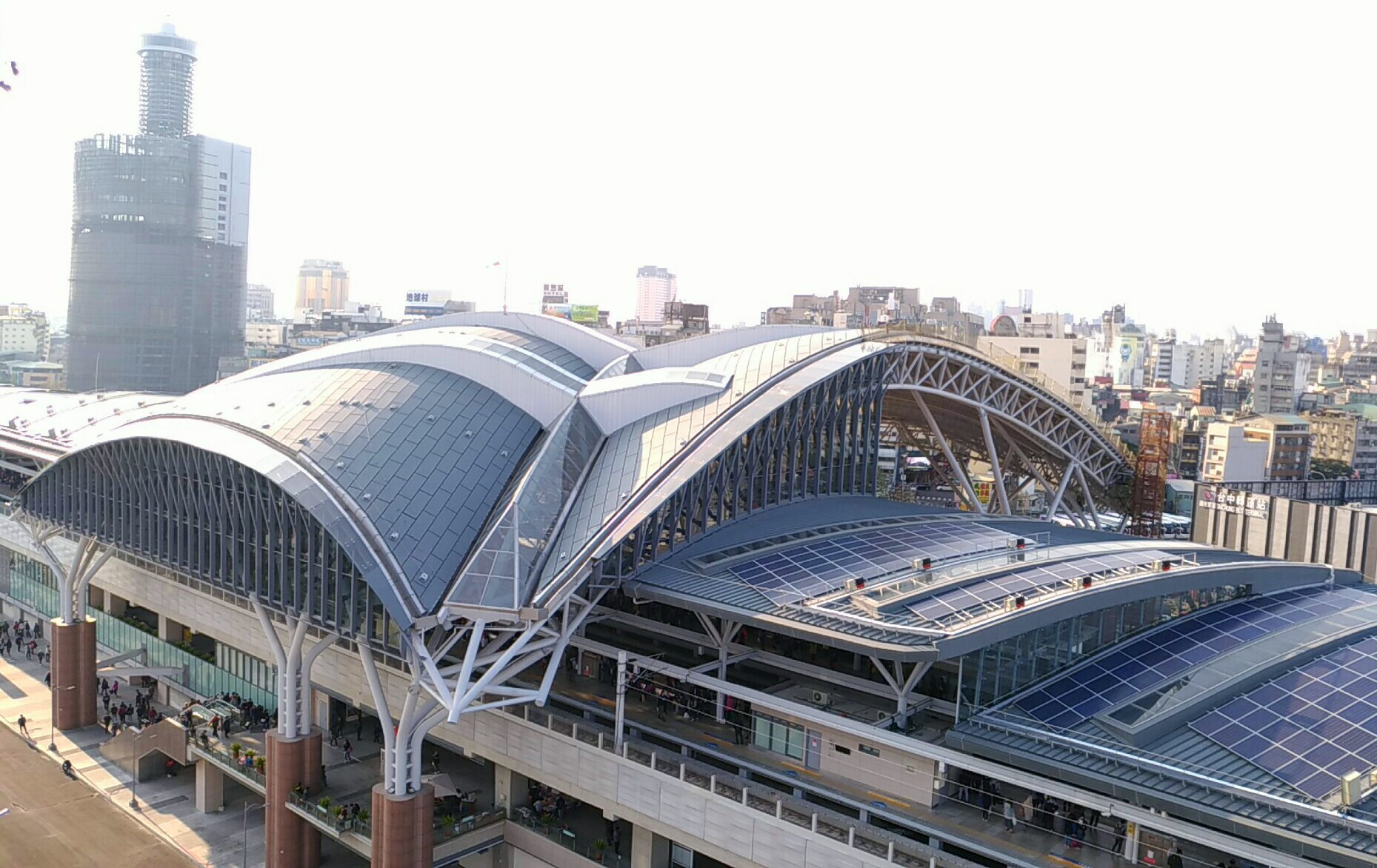

Chinese name
- Traditional Chinese: 臺中
Transcriptions
Standard Mandarin
- Hanyu Pinyin: Táizhōng
- Bopomofo: ㄊㄞˊ ㄓㄨㄥ
Hakka
- Romanization: Tǒi-zóng (Sixian dialect); Toi-zhùng (Hailu dialect)
Southern Min
- Tâi-lô: Tâi-tiong

General information
- Location: 1 Sec 1 Taiwan Blvd; Central District, Taichung; Taiwan
- Coordinates: 24.1370°N 120.6868°E
- System: TR railway station
- Line: Western Trunk line
- Distance: 193.3 km to Keelung
- Connections: Local bus; Coach

Construction
- Structure type: Elevated

Other information
- Station code: 146 (three-digit); 1319 (four-digit); T12 (statistical)
- Classification: Special class (Chinese: 特等)
- Website: www.railway.gov.tw/Taichung/index.aspx (in Chinese)

History
- Opened: 15 May 1905
- Rebuilt: 16 October 2016
- Electrified: 20 October 1978
- Former names: Taichū (Japanese: 臺中)

Key dates
- 1 October 2018: Station hub complete

Passengers
- 2017: 19.431 million per year ▼2.47%
- Rank: 5 out of 228

Services
Preceding station	Taiwan Railway	Following station
Jingwu towards Keelung	Western Trunk line	Wuquan towards Kaohsiung
Location
- Location within Taiwan

Taichung station (Chinese: 臺中車站; pinyin: Táizhōng Chēzhàn) is a railway station in Taichung, Taiwan served by Taiwan Railway (TR). It is served by all TR services on the Western Trunk line. It will also be served by the Blue line of the Taichung Metro, which is under construction.

== History ==
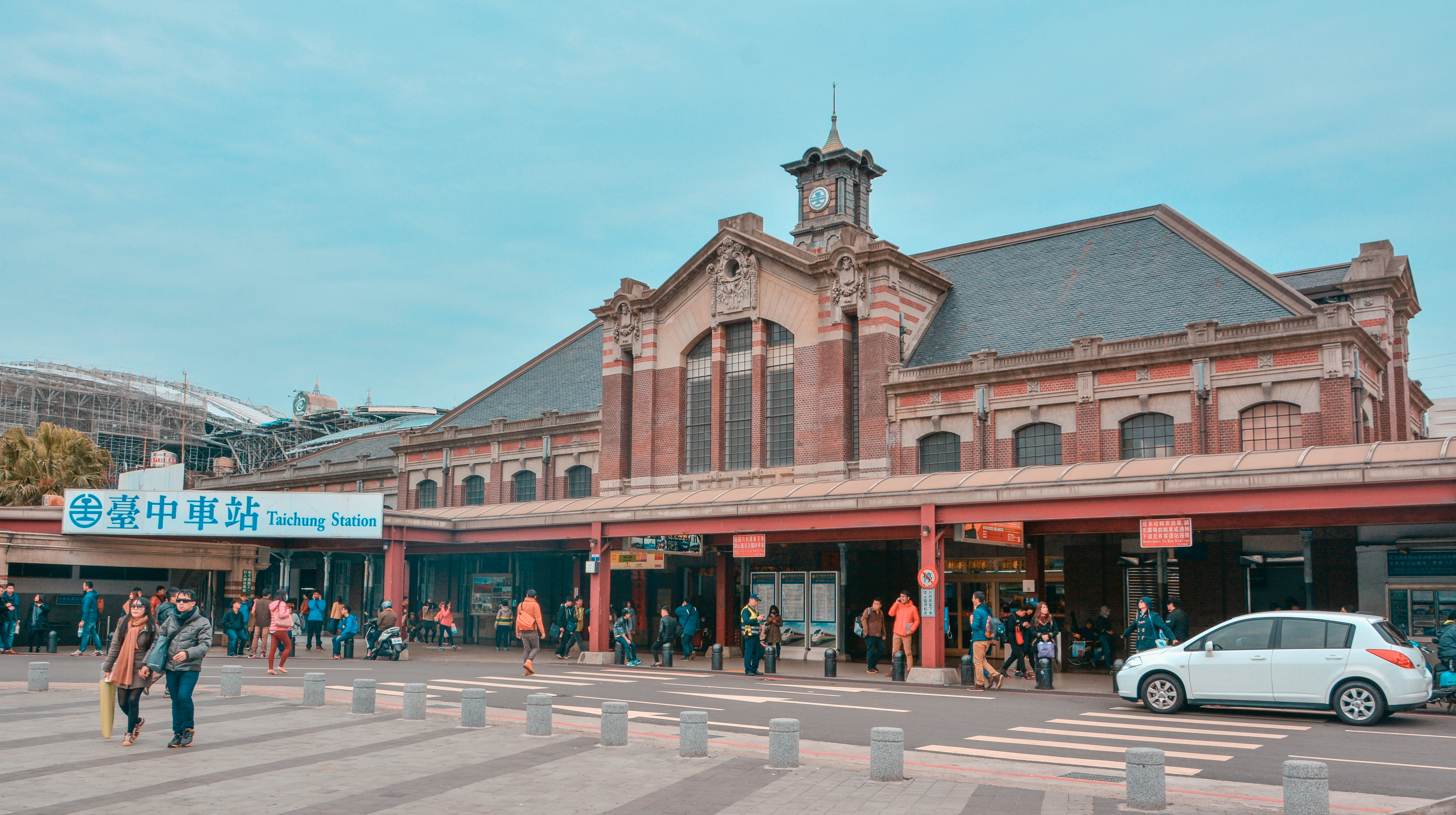
Former Taichung station building

The station was originally constructed in 1905 in a wooden building, and started its operation in 1908. In 1917, it was rebuilt as a red brick structure with a Renaissance architectural style.

On 16 October 2016, the elevated station was inaugurated and the ground-level station was shut down. The first train arrived at the elevated station at 06:28. The ceremony was attended by President Tsai Ing-wen and Transportation and Communication Minister Hochen Tan.

== Overview ==
The old station has one side platform and one island platform. The architecture dates from the era of Japanese rule, and is classified as a National Tier 2 Historic Site. The now-defunct Taiwan Sugar Railways' Zhong-Zhuo line once stopped at the station.

The new station layout has one side platform and two island platforms, but currently only the side platform and one island platform are used. They have the same numbering as the old station, but reversed.

== Platform layout ==
Jianguo Road

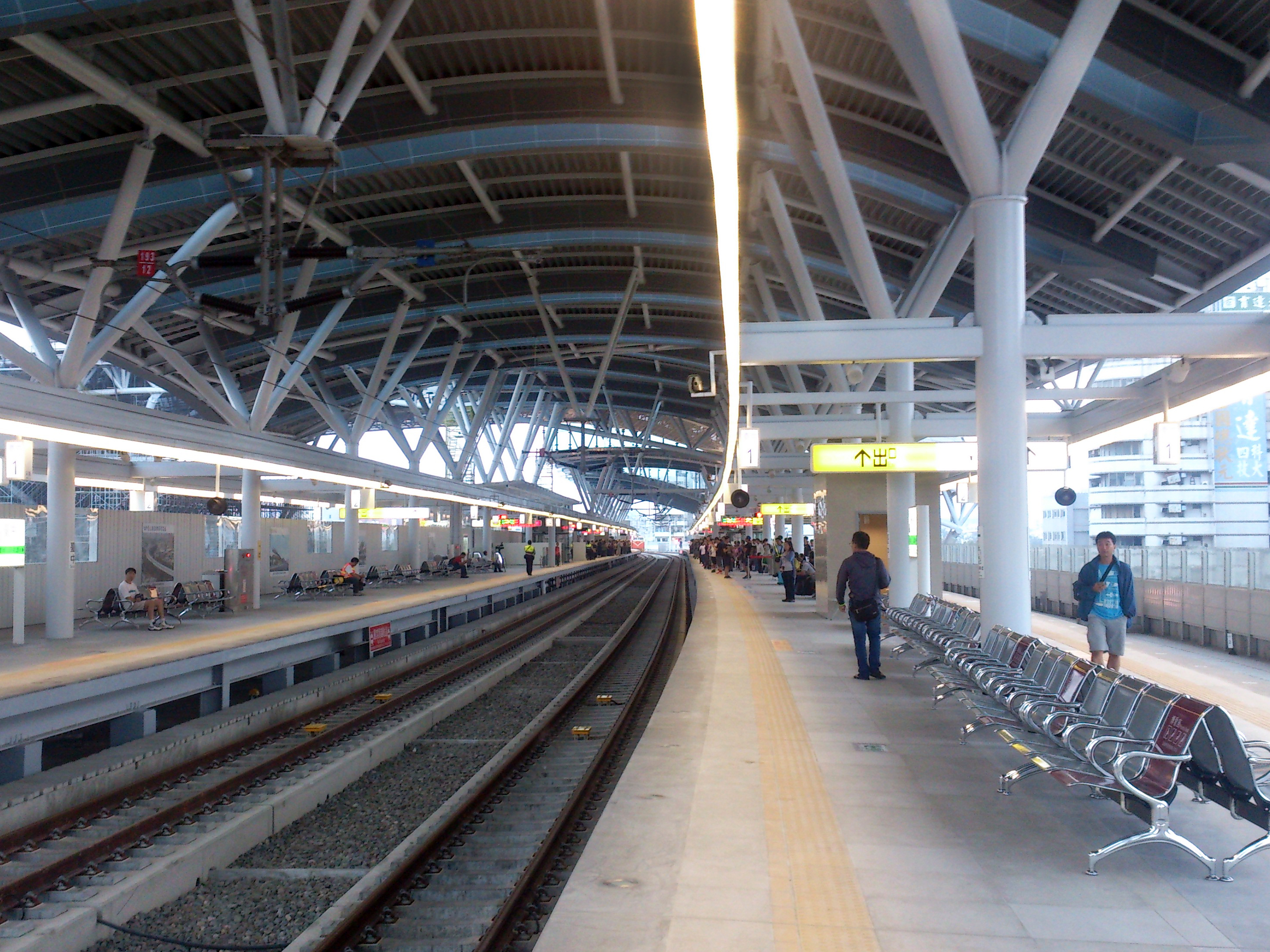
Platform

3	2	■ West Coast line (northbound)	Toward Hsinchu, Taoyuan, Taipei, Keelung
3	2	■ Eastern line (southbound, cross-line)	Toward Yilan, Hualien, Taitung
3	2	■West Coast line (southbound Sea line, through Chengzhui line)	Toward Fengyuan, Houli
2	1B	■ West Coast line (southbound)	Toward Changhua, Tainan, Kaohsiung, Pingtung
2	1B	■ West Coast (northbound through traffic)	Toward Hsinchu, Taoyuan, Taipei, Keelung
2	1B	■ South-link line (southbound)	Toward Fangliao, Taitung
2	1B	■ West Coast line (northbound Sea line, through Chengzhui line)	Toward Dajia, Zhunan, Hsinchu
1	1A	■ West Coast line (southbound, through traffic)	Toward Changhua, Tainan, Kaohsiung, Pingtung
1	1A	■ West Coast line (northbound Sea line departure, through Chengzhui line)	Toward Dajia, Zhunan, Hsinchu
1	1A	■ West Coast line (northbound departure)	Toward Fengyuan, Hsinchu, Taoyuan, Taipei
1	1A	■ Jiji line (southbound departure)	Toward Jiji, Checheng

Fuxing Road

== Around the station ==
- Chang Hwa Bank Headquarters and Museum
- National Chung Hsing University
- National Library of Public Information
- Taichung Confucian Temple
- Taichung Park
- Yizhong Street
- Central Bookstore
- Taichung Prefectural Hall
- Central District Office
- Taichung Hospital, Ministry of Health and Welfare, Executive Yuan
- Chungyo Department Store
- Taroko Mall
- Taichung First Square Mall
- Zhongxiao Night Market
