= Fengle =

Fengle (Chinese: 豐樂; pinyin: fēnglè), meaning "rich, happy", may refer to:

- Fengle (丰乐镇), Feixi County, Hefei, Anhui Province, China
- Fengle (丰乐镇), Jixian County, Shuangyashan, Heilongjiang province, China
- Fengle (丰乐镇), Liangzhou, Wuwei, Gansu Province, China
- Fengle (丰乐镇), Minle County, Zhangye, Gansu Province, China
- Fengle (丰乐镇), Suzhou, Jiuquan, Gansu Province, China
- Fengle (丰乐镇), Wuchuan Gelao and Miao Autonomous County, Zunyi, Guizhou Province, China
- Fengle (丰乐镇), Zhaozhou County, Daqing, Heilongjiang province, China
- Fengle Community, Jinxiang, Cangnan, Wenzhou, Zhejiang Province, China
- Fengle Subdistrict (丰乐街道), Hunnan, Shenyang, Liaoning, China
- Fengle Subdistrict (丰乐街道), Kaizhou, Chongqing, China
- Fengle Township (丰乐乡), Bayan County, Harbin, Heilongjiang Province, China
- Fengle Township (丰乐乡), Junlian County, Yibin, Sichuan Province, China
- Fengle Township (丰乐乡), Shimian County, Ya'an, Sichuan Province, China
- Fengle Village (丰乐村), Hengsha County, Chongming, Shanghai, China
- Fengle Village (丰乐村), Panshi Township, Rongjiang County, Qiandongnan, Guizhou Province, China
- Fengle Village (丰乐村), Zhonglu, Enshi, Hubei Province, China
- Fengle Sculpture Park, an urban park in Nantun District, Taichung, Taiwan
- Fengle Village (豐樂里), Nantun District, Taichung, Taiwan
- Fengle Village (豐樂里), Taitung City, Taiwan
- Feng-le Park metro station, Taiwan
