= Wenxin Forest Park metro station =

Metro station in Taichung, Taiwan

Wenxin Forest Park 112 文心森林公園
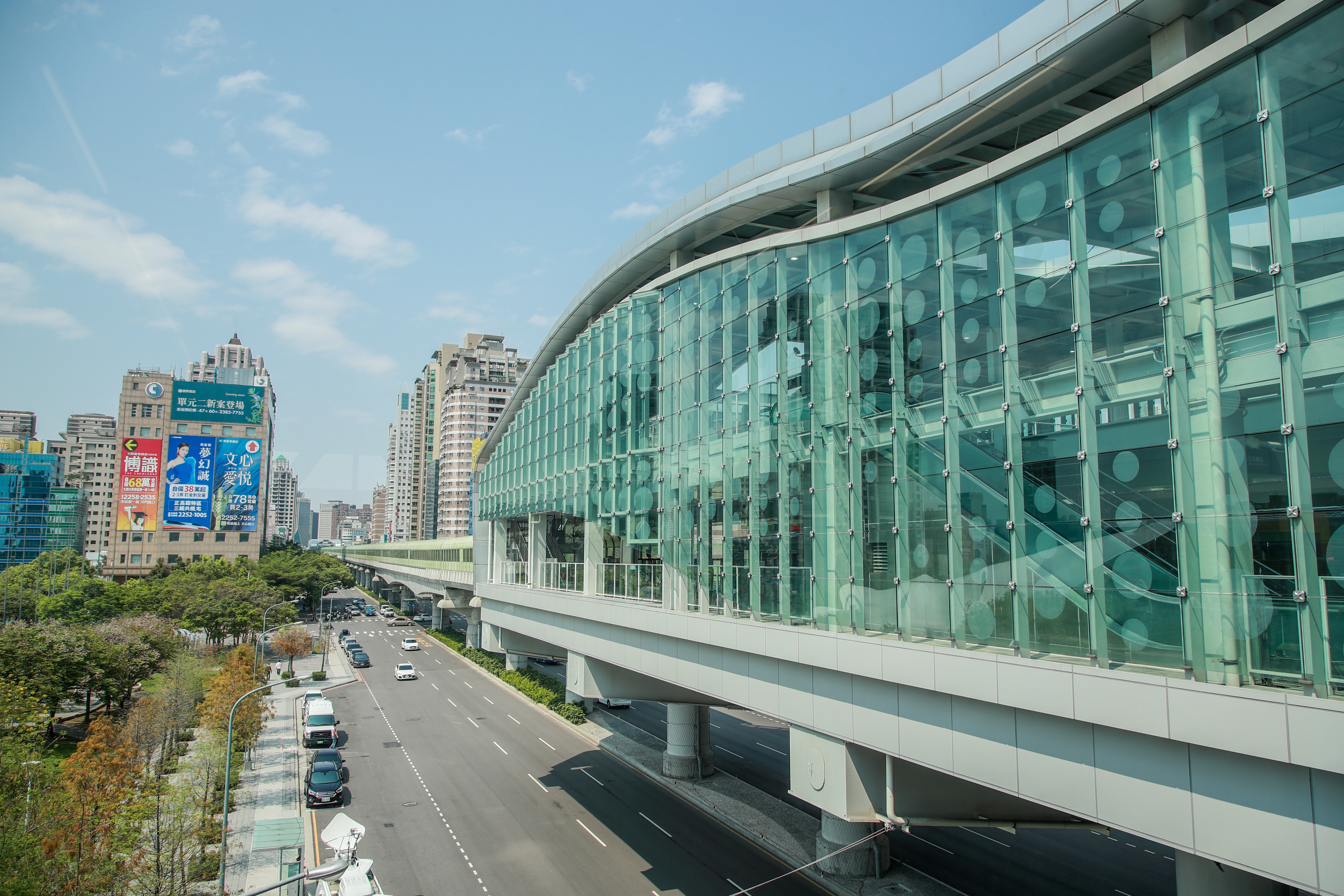

General information
- Location: Nantun, Taichung; Taiwan
- Coordinates: 24.1455°N 120.6468°E
- Operated by: Taichung MRT
- Line: Green line
- Platforms: 2 side platforms

Construction
- Structure type: Elevated

Other information
- Station code: 112

History
- Opened: 25 April 2021

Services
Preceding station	Taichung MRT	Following station
Nantun towards HSR Taichung Station	Green line	Shui-an Temple towards Beitun Main
Location

Wenxin Forest Park metro station
- Chinese: 文心森林公園站
Transcriptions
Standard Mandarin
- Hanyu Pinyin: Wénxīn Sēnlín Gōngyuán Zhàn
- Bopomofo: ㄨㄣˊ ㄒㄧㄣ ㄙㄣ ㄌㄧㄣˊ ㄍㄨㄥ ㄩㄢˊ ㄓㄢˋ
- Tongyong Pinyin: Wúnsin Senlín Gongyuán Jhàn

Wenxin Forest Park is a metro station on the Green line operated by Taichung MRT in Nantun District, Taichung, Taiwan.

The station name is taken from Wenxin Forest Park, a park that houses Fulfillment Amphitheater, which is located nearby.

== Station layout ==
4F	Crossover level	Platforms-connecting overpass
3F
3F	Side platform, doors will open on the right
3F	Track 1	Green line: towards HSR Taichung Station (Nantun)
3F	Track 2	Green line: towards Beitun Main (Shui-an Temple)
3F	Side platform, doors will open on the right
3F	Concourse
3F	Concourse	Lobby, information desk, automatic ticket dispensing machines, one-way faregates
2F	Mezzanine	Transitlink floor for stairs and escalators
1F	Street level	Exit/entrance
