= Sihwei Elementary School metro station =

Metro station in Taichung, Taiwan

Coordinates: 24.1711°N 120.6933°E

Sihwei Elementary School (Erfenpu) 105 四維國小（二分埔）
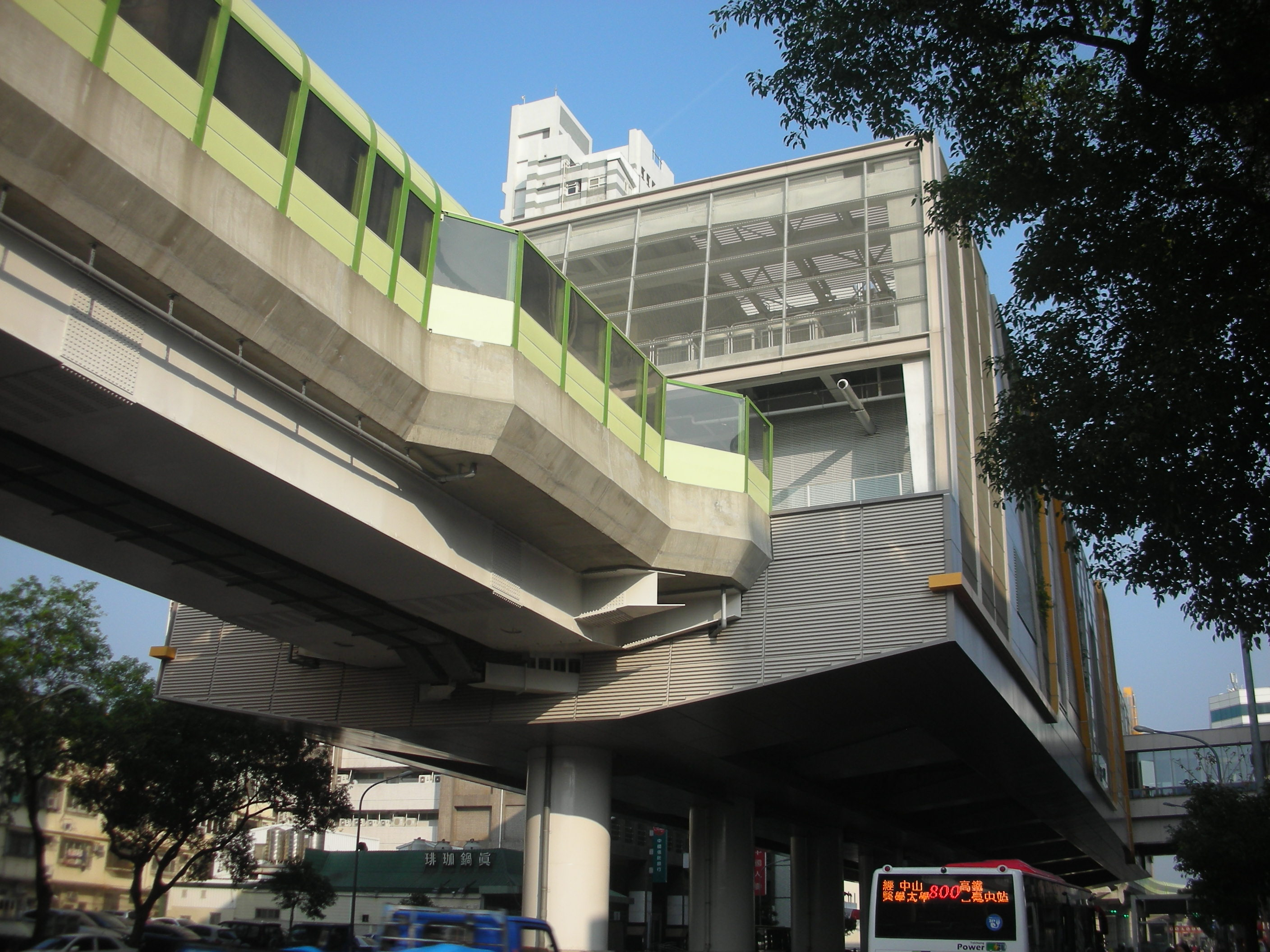

General information
- Location: Beitun, Taichung; Taiwan
- Operated by: Taichung MRT
- Line: Green line
- Platforms: 2 side platforms

Construction
- Structure type: Elevated

Other information
- Station code: 105

History
- Opened: 25 April 2021

Services
Preceding station	Taichung MRT	Following station
Wenxin Chongde towards HSR Taichung Station	Green line	Songzhu towards Beitun Main
Location

Sihwei Elementary School metro station
- Chinese: 四維國小站
Transcriptions
Standard Mandarin
- Hanyu Pinyin: Sìwéi Guóxiǎo Zhàn
- Bopomofo: ㄙˋ ㄨㄟˊ ㄍㄨㄛˊ ㄒㄧㄠˇ ㄓㄢˋ
- Tongyong Pinyin: Sìhwéi Guósiǎo Jhàn

Sihwei Elementary School is a metro station on the Green line operated by Taichung MRT in Beitun District, Taichung, Taiwan.

The station name is taken from the nearby Sihwei Elementary School, and is the only station name in the network to use Tongyong Pinyin.

== Station layout ==
4F	Crossover level	Platforms-connecting overpass
3F
3F	Side platform, doors will open on the right
3F	Track 1	Green line: towards HSR Taichung Station (Wenxin Chongde)
3F	Track 2	Green line: towards Beitun Main (Songzhu)
3F	Side platform, doors will open on the right
3F	Concourse
3F	Concourse	Lobby, information desk, automatic ticket dispensing machines, one-way faregates
2F	Mezzanine	Transitlink floor for stairs and escalators
1F	Street level	Exit/entrance
