= Shui-an Temple metro station =

Metro station in Taichung, Taiwan

Shui-an Temple 111 水安宮
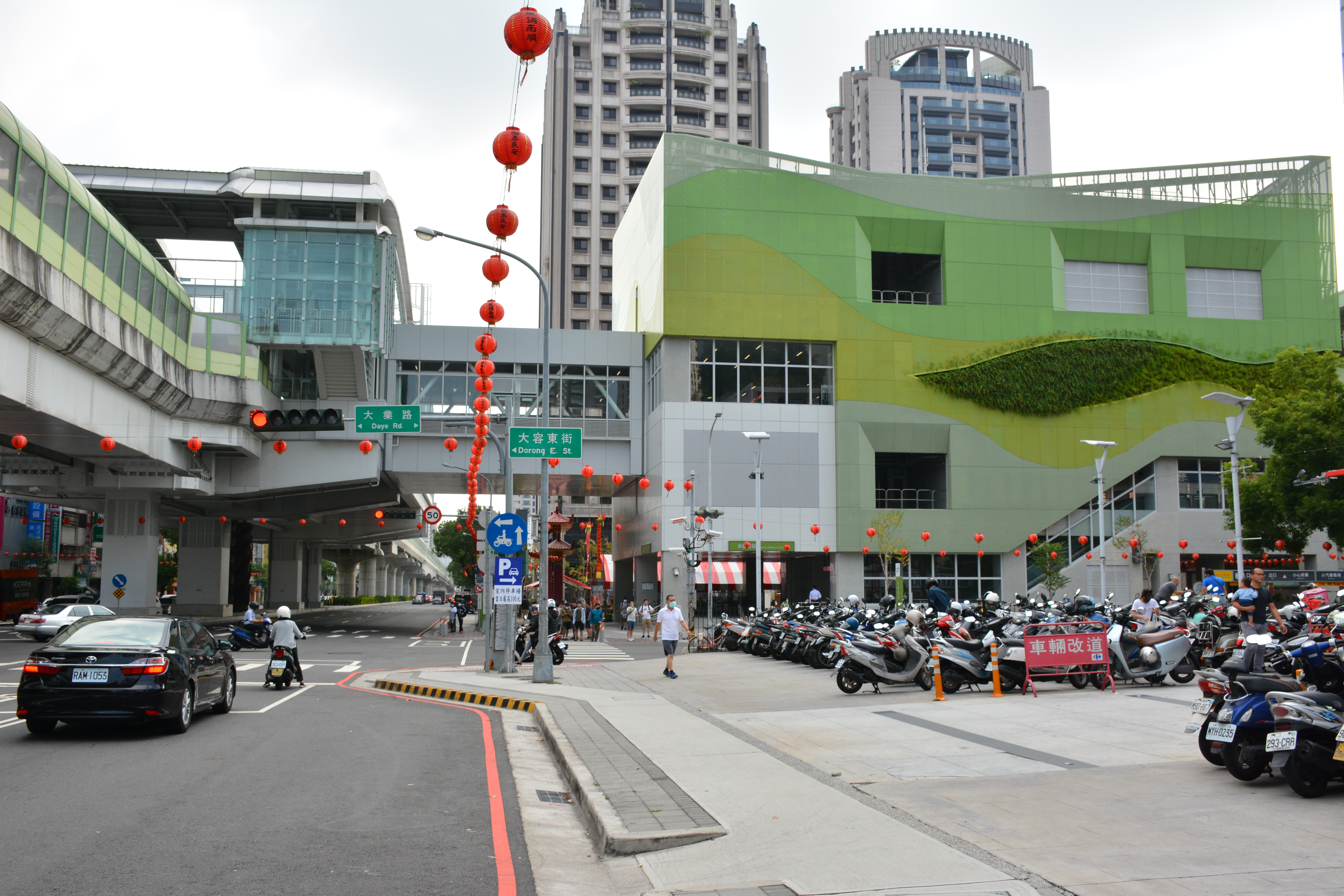

General information
- Location: Nantun, Taichung; Taiwan
- Coordinates: 24.1532°N 120.6468°E
- Operated by: Taichung MRT
- Line: Green line
- Platforms: 2 side platforms

Construction
- Structure type: Elevated

Other information
- Station code: 111

History
- Opened: 25 April 2021

Services
Preceding station	Taichung MRT	Following station
Wenxin Forest Park towards HSR Taichung Station	Green line	Taichung City Hall towards Beitun Main
Location

Shui-an Temple metro station
- Chinese: 水安宮站
Transcriptions
Standard Mandarin
- Hanyu Pinyin: Shuǐ'ān Gōng Zhàn
- Bopomofo: ㄕㄨㄟˇ ㄢ ㄍㄨㄥ ㄓㄢˋ
- Tongyong Pinyin: Shuěian Gong Jhàn

Shui-an Temple is a metro station on the Green line operated by Taichung MRT in Nantun District, Taichung, Taiwan.

The station name is taken from Shui-an Temple, which is located nearby. Initially, the station was known as Wenxin Daye Station (文心大業站), but it was renamed on August 18, 2020.

== Station layout ==
4F	Crossover level	Platforms-connecting overpass
3F
3F	Side platform, doors will open on the right
3F	Track 1	Green line: towards HSR Taichung Station (Wenxin Forest Park)
3F	Track 2	Green line: towards Beitun Main (Taichung City Hall)
3F	Side platform, doors will open on the right
3F	Concourse
3F	Concourse	Lobby, information desk, automatic ticket dispensing machines, one-way faregates
2F	Mezzanine	Transitlink floor for stairs and escalators
1F	Street level	Exit/entrance
