= Nantun metro station =

Metro station in Taichung, Taiwan

Nantun 113 南屯
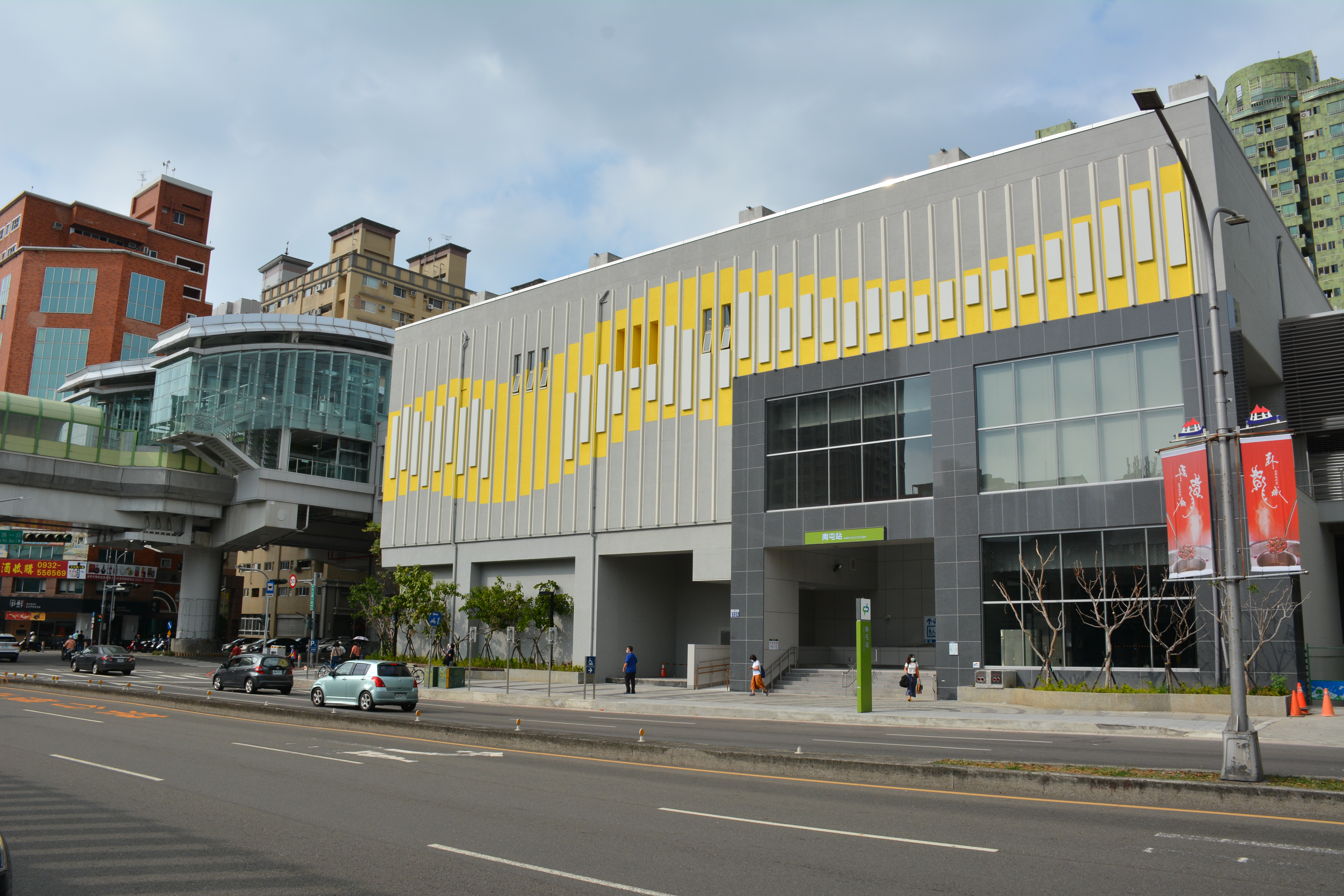

General information
- Location: Nantun, Taichung; Taiwan
- Coordinates: 24°8′25.001″N 120°38′48.001″E
- Operated by: Taichung MRT
- Line: Green line
- Platforms: 2 side platforms

Construction
- Structure type: Elevated

Other information
- Station code: 113

History
- Opened: 25 April 2021

Services
Preceding station	Taichung MRT	Following station
Feng-le Park towards HSR Taichung Station	Green line	Wenxin Forest Park towards Beitun Main
Location

Nantun metro station
- Chinese: 南屯站
Transcriptions
Standard Mandarin
- Hanyu Pinyin: Nántún Zhàn
- Bopomofo: ㄋㄢˊ ㄊㄨㄣˊ ㄓㄢˋ
- Tongyong Pinyin: Nántún Jhàn

Nantun is a metro station on the Green line operated by Taichung MRT in Nantun District, Taichung, Taiwan.

== Station layout ==
4F	Crossover level	Platforms-connecting overpass
3F
3F	Side platform, doors will open on the right
3F	Track 1	Green line: towards HSR Taichung Station (Feng-le Park)
3F	Track 2	Green line: towards Beitun Main (Wenxin Forest Park)
3F	Side platform, doors will open on the right
3F	Concourse
3F	Concourse	Lobby, information desk, automatic ticket dispensing machines, one-way faregates
2F	Mezzanine	Transitlink floor for stairs and escalators
1F	Street level	Exit/entrance

== Around the station ==
- Taichung Mosque
