= Jiushe metro station =

Metro station in Taichung, Taiwan

Jiushe 103 舊社
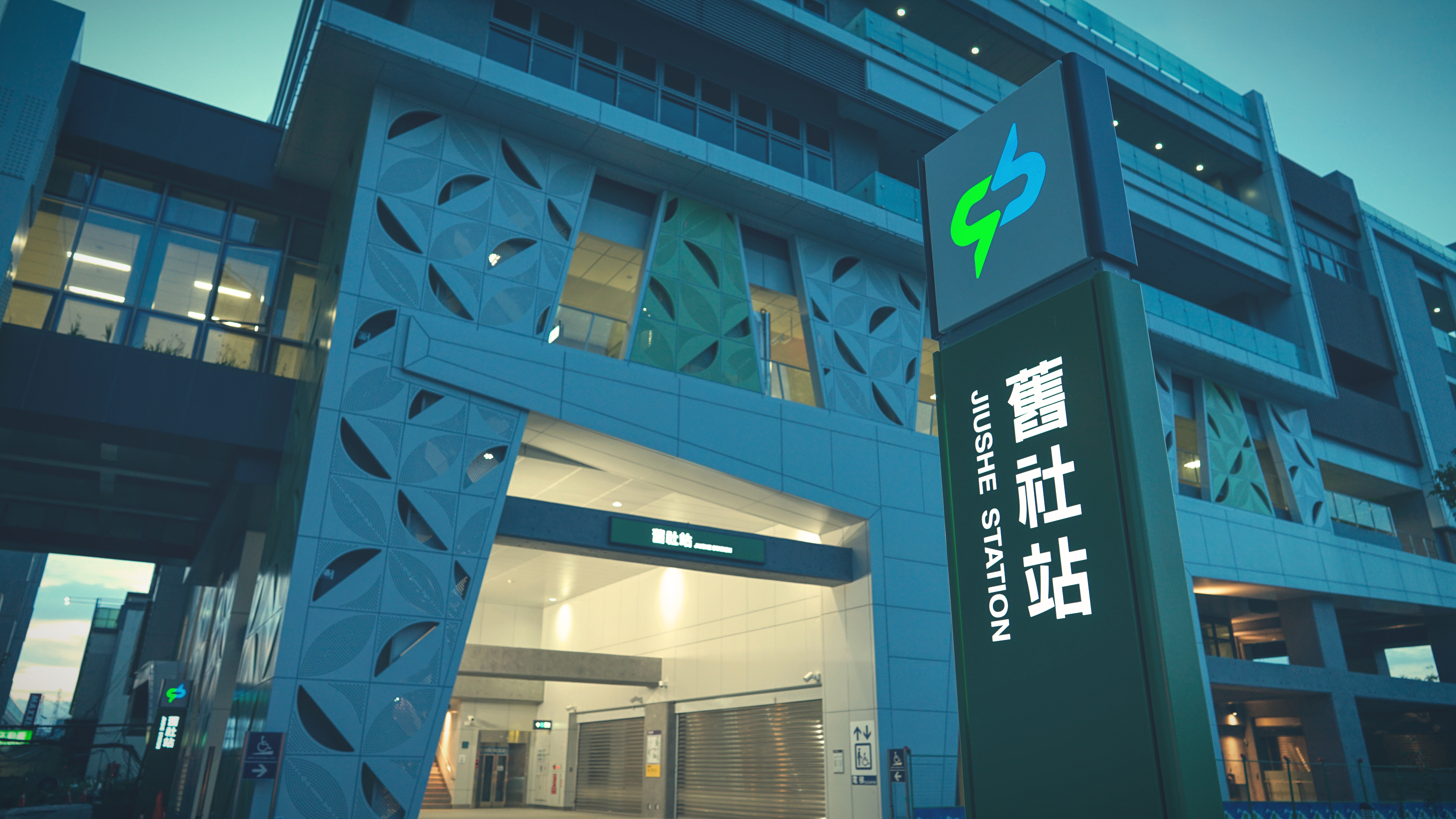
- Jiushe metro station in August 2020

General information
- Location: Beitun, Taichung; Taiwan
- Coordinates: 24°10′56″N 120°42′23″E
- Operated by: Taichung MRT
- Line: Green line
- Platforms: 2 side platforms

Construction
- Structure type: Elevated

Other information
- Station code: 103

History
- Opened: 25 April 2021

Services
Preceding station	Taichung MRT	Following station
Songzhu towards HSR Taichung Station	Green line	Beitun Main Terminus
Location

Jiushe metro station
- Chinese: 舊社站
Transcriptions
Standard Mandarin
- Hanyu Pinyin: Jiùshè Zhàn
- Bopomofo: ㄐㄧㄡˋ ㄕㄜˋ ㄓㄢˋ
- Tongyong Pinyin: Jiòushè Jhàn

Jiushe is a metro station operated by Taichung MRT located in Beitun District, Taichung, Taiwan. It is on the Green line and is the western terminus of the planned Dakeng Extension.

The station name is taken from an old name of the area.

== Station layout ==
4F	Side platform, doors will open on the right
4F	Track 1	Green line: towards Beitun Main
4F	Track 2	Green line: towards HSR Taichung Station (Songzhu)
4F	Side platform, doors will open on the right
3F	Concourse	Lobby, information desk, automatic ticket dispensing machines, one-way faregates
2F	Mezzanine	Transitlink floor for stairs and escalators
1F
1F	Street level	Exit/entrance

== Around the station ==
- Zongzhan Night Market
- Nanxing Park
- Han River
- Wagor High School
- Dakeng

== Exits ==
Single exit: Intersection of Songzhu Road and Dunfu Road
