= Taichung (disambiguation) =

Taichung is a special municipality in Taiwan.

Taichung may also refer to:

- National Taichung Theater, an opera house in Taichung
- Port of Taichung, the second largest port in Taiwan
- Taichung Bank, a Taiwanese bank
- Taichung BRT, a former bus rapid transit system
- Taichung City Bus, a bus network
- Taichung County (1945 and 2010), a former county of Taiwan
- Taichung Intercontinental Baseball Stadium, a stadium Taichung
- Taichung line, a railway line in Taichung
- Taichung MRT, the Taichung metro system
- Taichung Mosque, a mosque in Taichung
- Taichung Park, a park in Taichung
- Taichung Power Plant, a power plant in Taichung
- Taichung Prefectural Hall, a former government building in Taichung
- Taichung railway station, a railway station in Taichung
- Taichung Suns, a professional basketball team in Taichung

== See also ==
- Taizong (disambiguation)
