= Green line (Taichung MRT) =

Metro rail line in Taichung, Taiwan

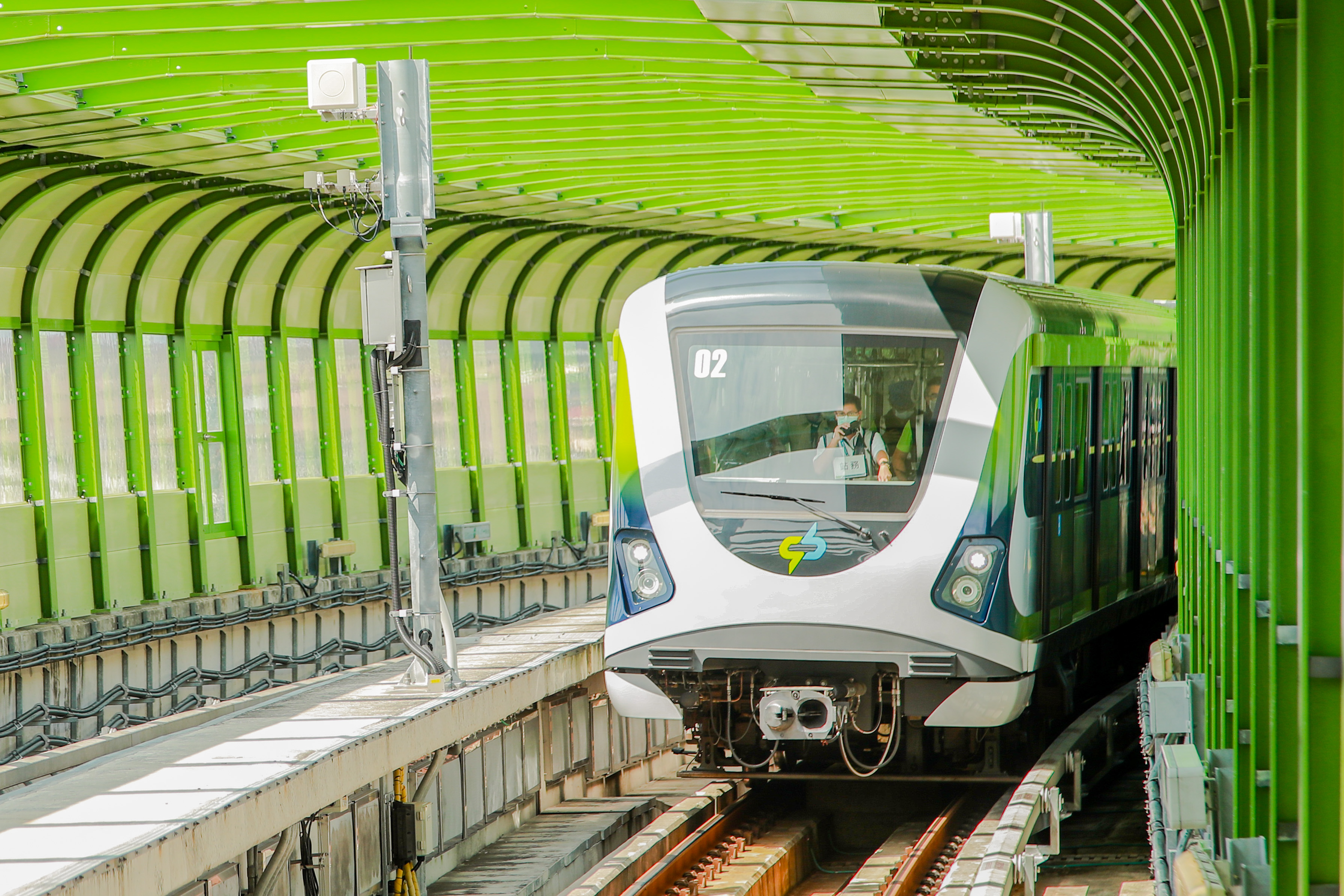
- A train running on the Green line. The surrounding noise barriers are installed for much of the line's length.

Overview
- Other name: Line 1, Wuri-Wenxin-Beitun line
- Native name: 臺中捷運綠線
- Locale: Taichung, Taiwan
- Termini: Beitun Main; HSR Taichung station
- Stations: 18 in operation 7 planned

Service
- Type: Medium capacity rapid transit
- System: Taichung MRT
- Depot: Beitun Depot
- Rolling stock: 18 two-car fully automated trains
- Daily ridership: 46,077 (average, Aug. 2025)

History
- Opened: 25 April 2021; 5 years ago

Technical
- Line length: 16.71 km (10.4 mi)
- Number of tracks: 2
- Character: Elevated
- Track gauge: 1,435 mm (4 ft 8 1/2 in) standard gauge
- Electrification: 750 V DC third rail
- Operating speed: 70 km/h (43 mph)
- Signalling: Alstom Urbalis 400 moving block CBTC ATC under ATO GoA 4 (UTO), with subsystems of ATP, Iconis ATS and Smartlock CBI

The Green line of the Taichung MRT is a medium-capacity rapid transit line in Taichung. The line was briefly opened to the public on 16 November 2020, but closed on 22 November due to faulty couplers on the trains. The line officially re-entered service on 25 April 2021, becoming Taiwan's fifth rapid transit system in operation. Two extensions, one heading east to Dakeng and the other reaching south into Changhua, are also planned.

== Route overview ==
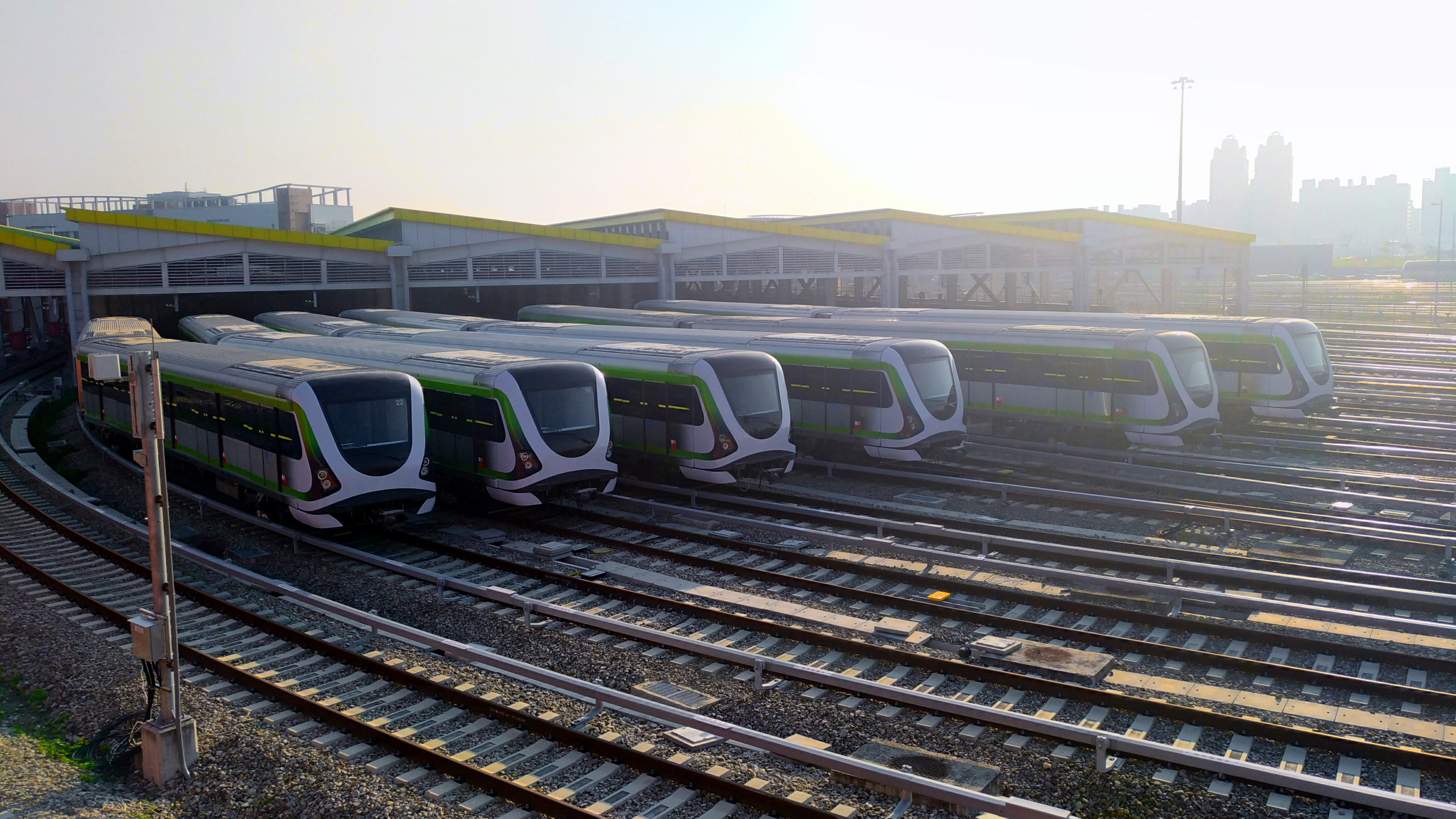
Trains at Beitun Depot

The current line is known as the Wuri-Wenxin-Beitun line (烏日文心北屯線). It begins in Beitun District at Beitun Main Station and runs westward, crossing the TR Taichung line at Songzhu station. Then it follows Wenxin Road along Taichung's 7th Redevelopment Zone, passing through Xitun and Nantun districts and forming a wide semicircle around the city center. At Daqing station, the line runs parallel to the TRA Taichung line until its western terminus at Taichung HSR Station in Wuri. The line is fully elevated except for small sections at both termini.

=== Planned extensions ===
There are two planned extensions to the line. The first, known as the Dakeng Extension, branches east from Jiushe station and runs along Songzhu Road to the base of Dakeng. The second, known as the Changhua Extension, runs west past Taichung HSR station and crosses the Dadu River to Changhua. The extensions add two and five more stations respectively, and will cost an additional $25 billion NTD.

== History ==
=== Planning and construction ===
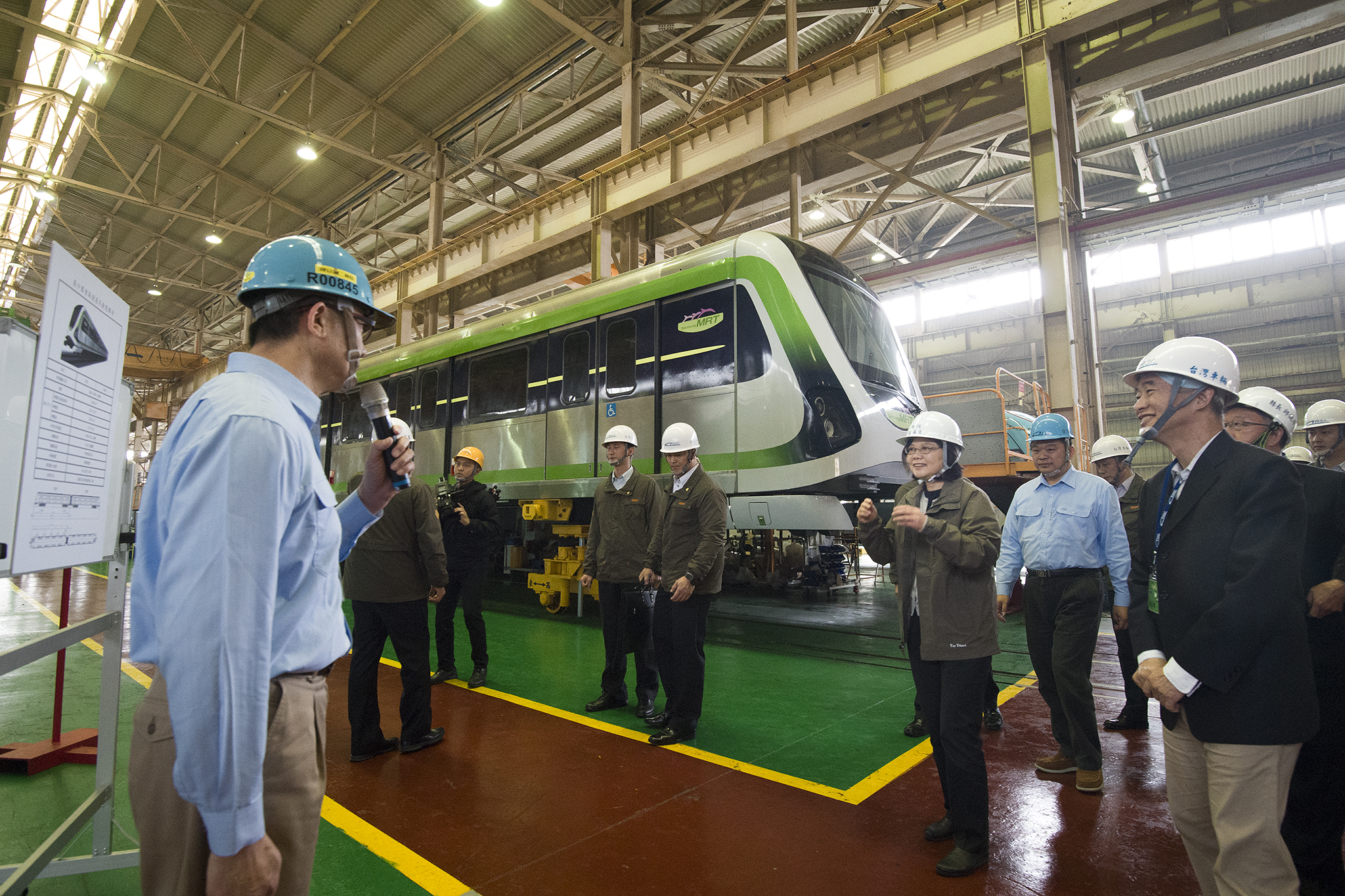
President Tsai Ing-wen inspecting the new trains

A metro system in Taichung was discussed since 1990, which would connect various suburbs including Caotun, Zhongxing New Village, and others. The plan was dropped due to high cost and low projected ridership. A new proposal was renewed and approved in 2004, but construction did not begin immediately because of costs exceeding estimates and disagreements over where stations would be.

In 2010, preliminary work began by relocating trees on the median and rerouting the utilities that run under those roads. Progress was plagued by various delays, including conflicts between the city and electrical contractors, problems with land acquisition, and the bankruptcy of a major utilities contractor. Because of the delays, mayor Jason Hu and his administration were heavily criticized by rivaling political parties.

Formal construction began in May 2013. Two separate incidents occurred during construction. On 19 August 2014, a crane malfunctioned and broke off its arm, falling on top of a restaurant. No injuries were reported. On 10 April 2015, a crane's arm snapped while lifting a 209-ton I-beam, causing the beam to fall and crush a car underneath. Workers atop the beam were also thrown off. The driver of the car and three workers lost their lives, while four other works sustained heavy injuries. Construction was halted for three months following the incident. On 30 June 2016, construction of the line was completed, and testing began soon after.

Initially, the stations' numbers were numbered sequentially from G1 to G20, with the "G" representing green. However, since G8 is pronounced similar to chi-bai, which is considered profane in Hokkien, the "G" prefix was changed to "1", which represents how the Green line is the first line completed. The station's English names were initially written in a mix of Tongyong Pinyin and Hanyu Pinyin, and the lack of standardization drew criticism. On 24 August 2020, the Taichung City Council decided to use Hanyu Pinyin for all stations except for Sihwei Elementary School.

=== Operations ===
Beginning on 16 November 2020, the Green line was opened to the public for testing. It was free to ride until its formal opening ceremony, planned for on 19 December. On the first day, 70,977 passengers used the line. However, on 21 November, the couplers on one of the trains snapped in half; the line was closed to the public the next day. On 27 November, another coupler was found to be broken.

Trial runs resumed on 25 March 2021. An opening ceremony was held on 25 April 2021.

== Rolling stock ==
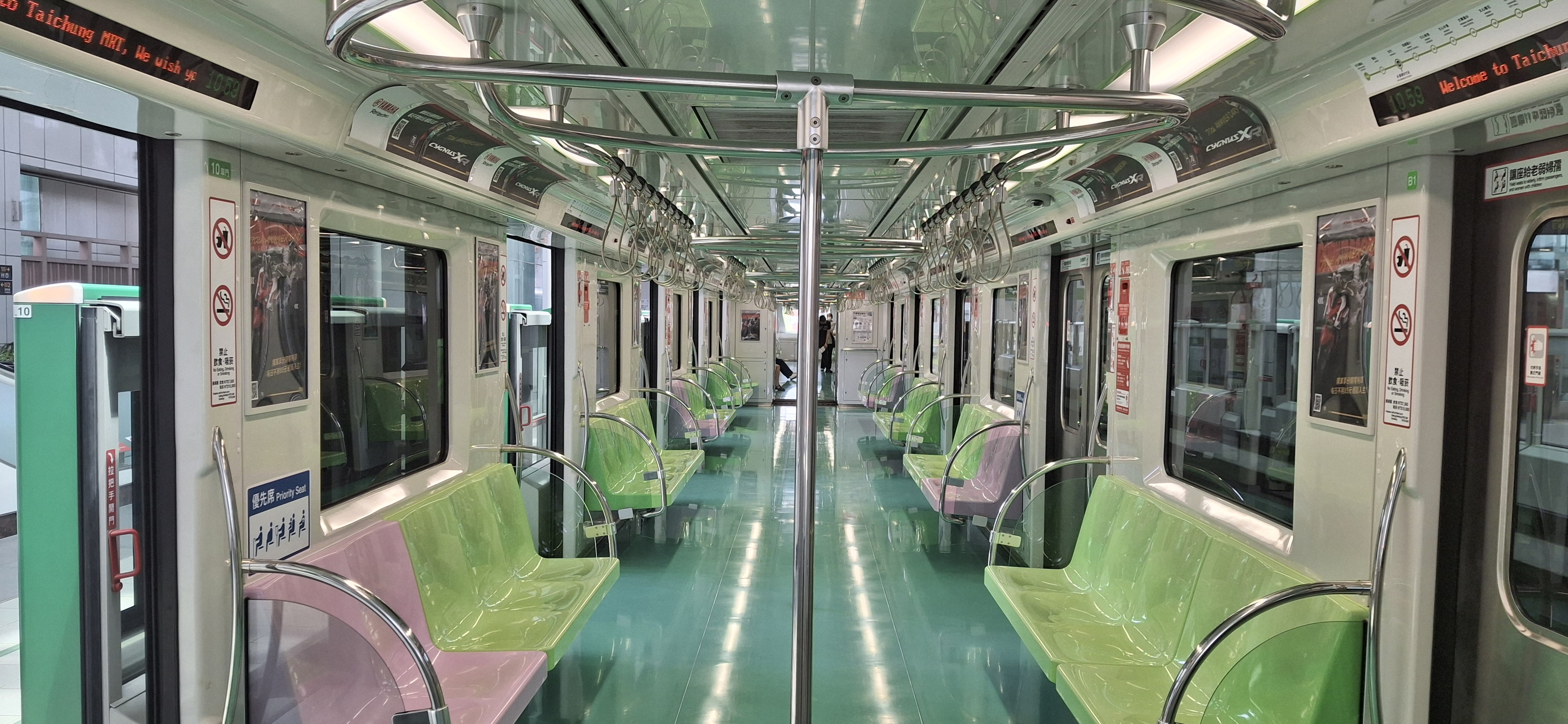
The inside of a taichung green line train

The line runs eighteen two-car EMU trains equipped with automatic train operation. The trains are powered by a direct current, 750 V third rail. Each train has a capacity of roughly 536 people divided into two cars, each with ten doors and two air conditioning units. Of the eighteen trains, nine are built by Kawasaki Heavy Industries in Kobe, Japan, while the remaining nine are built by Taiwan Rolling Stock Company.

== Station list ==

=== Wuri-Wenxin-Beitun Line ===
Code	Station name		Connections	Location	
Code	English	Chinese	Connections	District	City
103a	Beitun Main	北屯總站		Beitun	Taichung
103	Jiushe	舊社	Dakeng Extension (planned)	Beitun	Taichung
104	Songzhu	松竹	Taichung line	Beitun	Taichung
105	Sihwei Elementary School (Erfenpu)	四維國小 (二分埔)		Beitun	Taichung
106	Wenxin Chongde	文心崇德	Red Line (planned)	Beitun	Taichung
107	Wenxin Zhongqing (Tianjin Shopping District)	文心中清 (天津商圈)	Orange Line (planned)	North	Taichung
108	Wenhua Senior High School	文華高中		Xitun	Taichung
109	Wenxin Yinghua	文心櫻花		Xitun	Taichung
110	Taichung City Hall	市政府	Blue line (under construction)	Xitun	Taichung
111	Shui-an Temple	水安宮		Nantun	Taichung
112	Wenxin Forest Park	文心森林公園		Nantun	Taichung
113	Nantun (Wenxin Wuquan W.)	南屯 (文心五權西)	Red Line (planned)	Nantun	Taichung
114	Feng-le Park	豐樂公園		Nantun	Taichung
115	Daqing (Chung Shan Medical University)	大慶 (中山醫大)	Taichung line	South	Taichung
116	Jiuzhangli	九張犁		Wuri	Taichung
117	Jiude	九德		Wuri	Taichung
118	Wuri	烏日	Taichung line (out of station transfer)	Wuri	Taichung
119	HSR Taichung Station	高鐵臺中站	Taichung line (Xinwuri); Taiwan High Speed Rail; Changhua Extension (planned)	Wuri	Taichung

=== Dakeng Extension ===
Code	Station name		Transfers	Location	
Code	English	Chinese	Transfers	District	City
101	Yuanshan New Village	圓山新村		Beitun	Taichung
102	Jungongliao	軍功寮		Beitun	Taichung

=== Changhua Extension ===
Code	Station name		Transfers	Location	
Code	English	Chinese	Transfers	District	City
120	Chenggongling	成功嶺		Wuri	Taichung
121	Xialaoxu	下勞胥		Wuri	Taichung
122	Duchuantou	渡船頭		Changhua City	Changhua County
123	Kulingjiao	苦苓腳		Changhua City	Changhua County
124	Jinma	金馬	Taichung Line (via Jinma Station, planned)	Changhua City	Changhua County

== Incidents ==
On 10 May 2023, a construction crane fell 30 floors from a construction site of Highwealth Construction Corp onto a moving Green line train south of Feng-le Park metro station, killing one and injuring 10 passengers on board.

On 21 May 2024, a Taiwanese man carried out a stabbing spree directed at passengers on a Green line train, near Taichung City Hall station. Three people, including the attacker, were injured. The attack occurred exactly ten years after the 2014 Taipei Metro attack.
