= Taizhong (disambiguation) =

Taizhong is Hanyu Pinyin for Taichung.

Taizhong may also refer to:

- Taizhong Town (太忠镇), Jingdong Yi Autonomous County, Yunnan Province, China
- Taizhong Village (太忠村), Taiping, Jixian County, Heilongjiang Province, China
- You Taizhong, a general of the Chinese People's Liberation Army

== See also ==
- Taichung (disambiguation)
