= Liucuo (Taichung) =

Area in Nantun, Taichung, Taiwan

Liucuo (劉厝) is a historical name for an area located in Nantun District, Taichung, Taiwan. Situated on the bank of the Fazi River, it encompasses roughly the south end of Xinsheng Village.

== History ==
The name translates to "House of Liu". Liucuo is one of the first areas to be settled in Taichung, being recorded in early Japanese era maps.
