= Taichung station =

Taichung station may refer to the following stations in Taichung, Taiwan:

- Taichung HSR station, a high speed rail station, adjacent to TRA Xinwuri station
- Taichung railway station, a station served exclusively by the Taiwan Railways Administration
