= Feng-le Park metro station =

Metro station in Taichung, Taiwan

Feng-le Park 114 豐樂公園
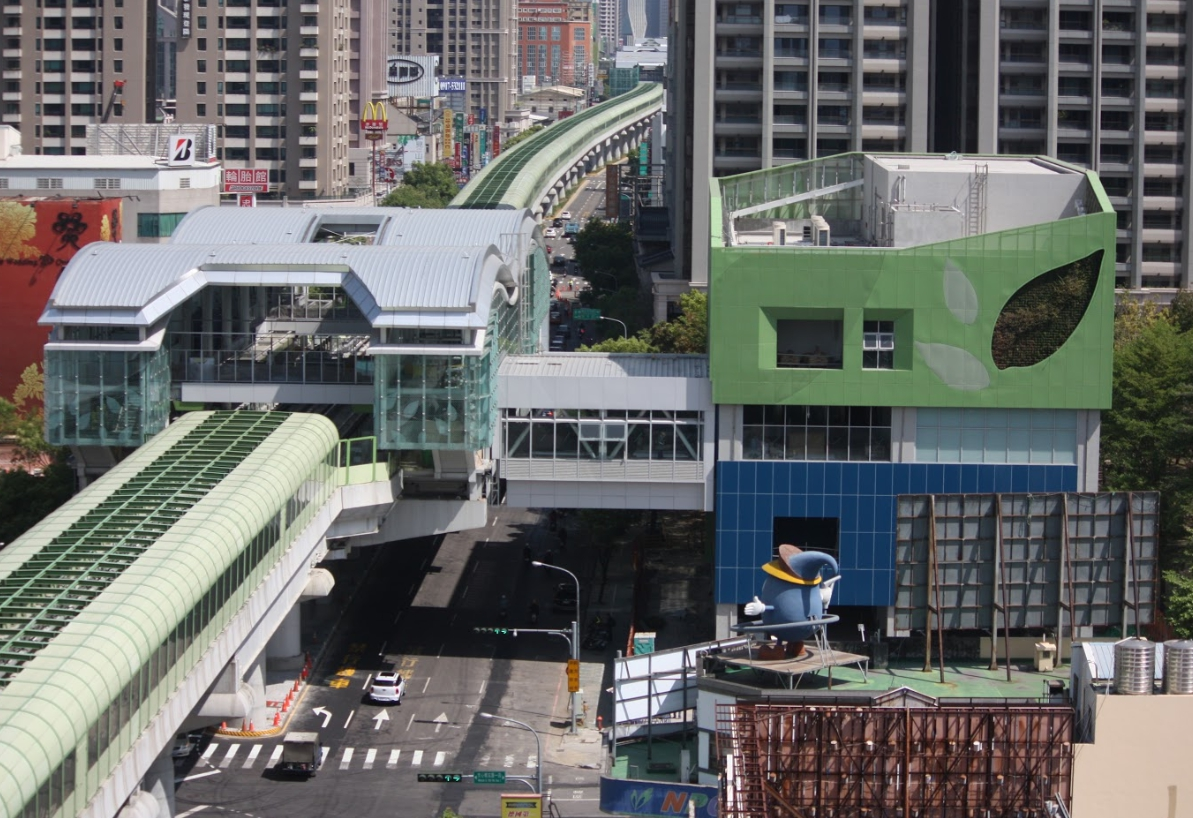

General information
- Location: Nantun, Taichung; Taiwan
- Coordinates: 24.1326°N 120.6468°E
- Operated by: Taichung MRT
- Line: Green line
- Platforms: 2 side platforms

Construction
- Structure type: Elevated

Other information
- Station code: 114

History
- Opened: 25 April 2021

Services
Preceding station	Taichung MRT	Following station
Daqing towards HSR Taichung Station	Green line	Nantun towards Beitun Main
Location

Feng-le Park metro station
- Chinese: 豐樂公園站
Transcriptions
Standard Mandarin
- Hanyu Pinyin: Fēnglé Gōngyuán Zhàn
- Bopomofo: ㄈㄥ ㄌㄜˋ ㄍㄨㄥ ㄩㄢˊ ㄓㄢˋ
- Tongyong Pinyin: Fonglè Gongyuán Jhàn

Feng-le Park is a metro station on the Green Line operated by Taichung MRT in Nantun District, Taichung, Taiwan.

The station name is taken from Fengle Sculpture Park, located nearby.

== Station layout ==
4F	Crossover level	Platforms-connecting overpass
3F
3F	Side platform, doors will open on the right
3F	Track 1	Green line: towards HSR Taichung Station (Daqing)
3F	Track 2	Green line: towards Beitun Main (Nantun)
3F	Side platform, doors will open on the right
3F	Concourse
3F	Concourse	Lobby, information desk, automatic ticket dispensing machines, one-way faregates
2F	Mezzanine	Transitlink floor for stairs and escalators
1F	Street level	Exit/entrance

== Accidents and incidents ==
On 10 May 2023, a construction crane fell 30 floors from a construction site of Highwealth Construction Corp. onto a moving Green Line train south of Feng-le Park metro station, Taichung, Taiwan, killing one and injuring 10 passengers onboard.

== Around the station ==
- Fengle Sculpture Park
- Costco Taichung store
- Decathlon Nantun Store
- Lingyenshan Monastery Taichung Nianfo Hall
- SHOWTIME Live Taichung Wenxin shopping centre
- Tzu Chi Charity Foundation Taichung Branch
