= Taichung MRT Green line EMU =

Train in Taichung, Taiwan

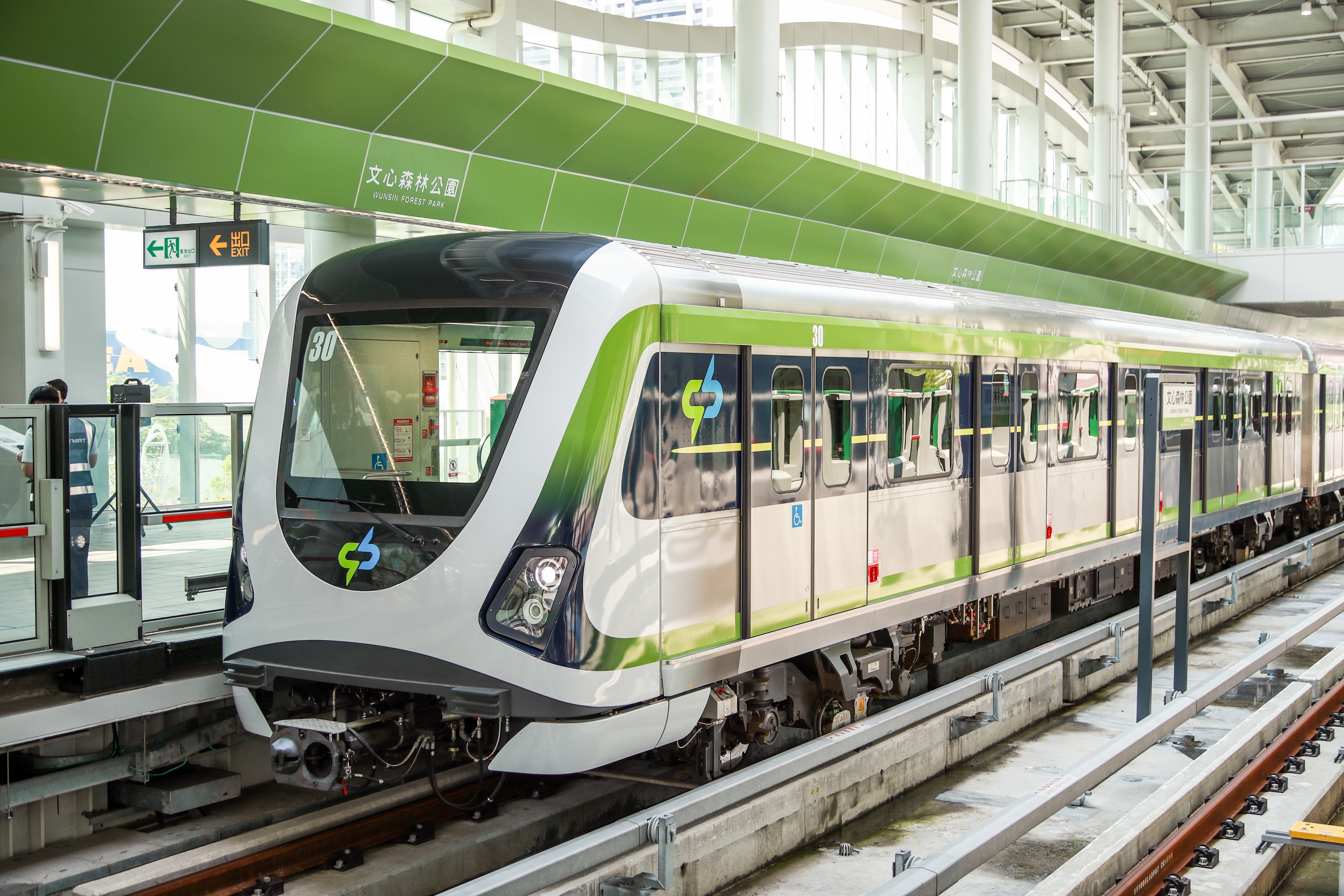

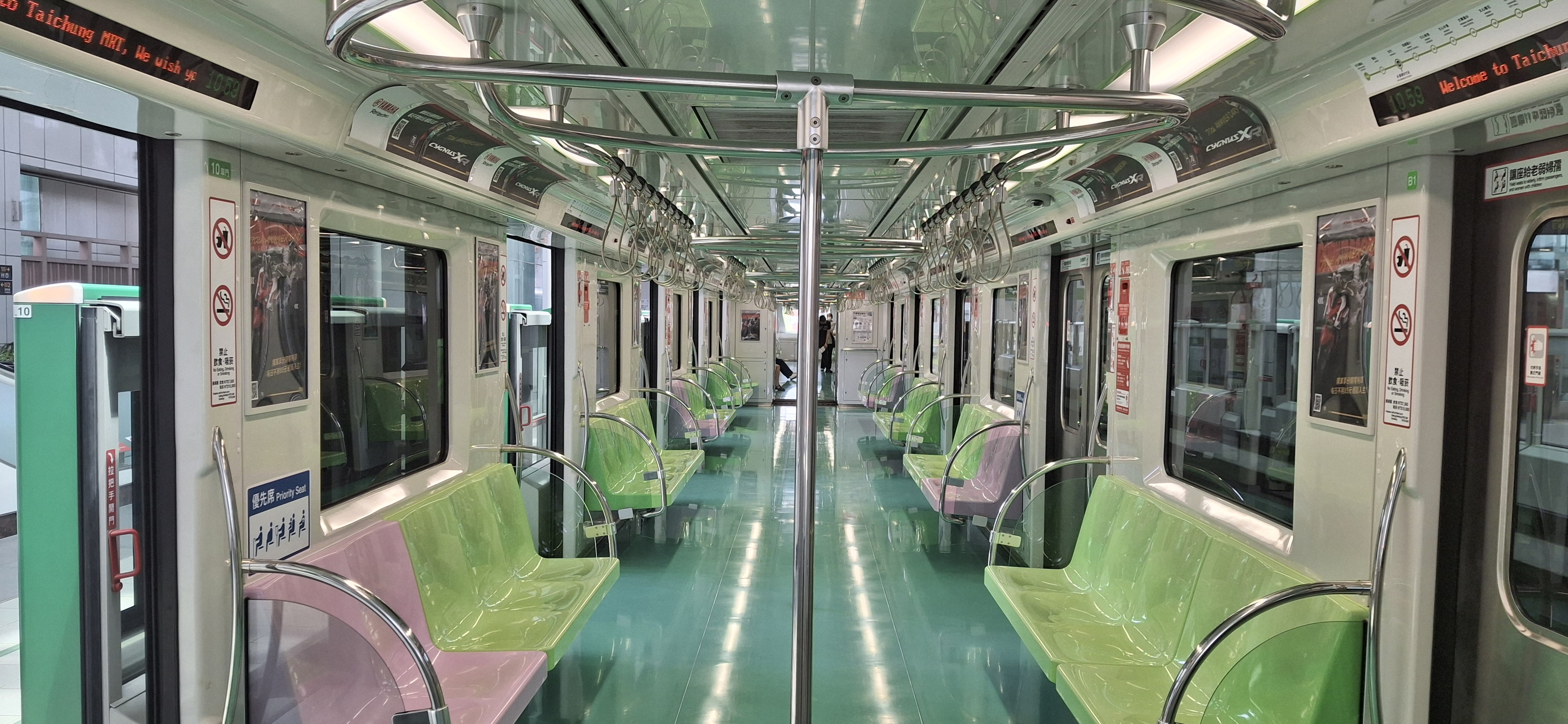
- The inside of the train
- In service: 16–21 November 2020 (revenue service testing); 2021–present
- Manufacturers: Kawasaki Heavy Industries, Taiwan Rolling Stock Company
- Assembly: Hsinchu
- Built at: Kōbe, Hyōgo, Japan
- Constructed: 2017
- Entered service: 25 April 2021 (official service)
- Number built: 36 vehicles (18 sets)
- Number in service: 36 vehicles (18 sets)
- Formation: 2-car sets
- Fleet numbers: 01 – 36
- Operator: Taichung Metro Corporation
- Depot: Beitun
- Line served: Green

Specifications
- Car body construction: Stainless steel and FRP
- Train length: 44.34 m (145 ft 5 11/16 in)
- Car length: 22.17 m (72 ft 8 13/16 in)
- Width: 2.98 m (9 ft 9 5/16 in)
- Height: 3.78 m (12 ft 4 13/16 in)
- Doors: 5 per side
- Maximum speed: 80 km/h (50 mph) (design); 70 km/h (43 mph) (service)
- Weight: 86.3 t (84.9 long tons; 95.1 short tons)
- Traction system: Mitsubishi Electric MAP-144-75VD297 hybrid SiC-IGBT–VVVF
- Traction motors: 8 × Mitsubishi 3-phase AC induction motor
- Gear ratio: 6.06 : 1 (103 / 17)
- Acceleration: 1.3 m/s^{2} (4.3 ft/s^{2})
- Deceleration: 1–1.3 m/s^{2} (3.3–4.3 ft/s^{2})
- Electric systems: 750 V DC third rail
- Current collection: Contact shoe
- UIC classification: Bo′Bo′+Bo′Bo′
- Bogies: KW-201
- Safety systems: Alstom Urbalis 400 moving block CBTC with subsystems of ATC, ATO under GoA 4 (UTO), ATP, Iconis ATS and Smartlock CBI
- Coupling system: Wabtec
- Track gauge: 1,435 mm (4 ft 8 1/2 in) standard gauge

The Taichung MRT Green line EMU is the electric multiple unit train types that are used for the Green line of the Taichung MRT.

== Fleet listing ==
The configuration of a 2-car Green line train is two powered cars that contain all electrical equipment. Each train consists of an odd car and an even car.
