= Fengle Sculpture Park =

Park in Nantun, Taichung, Taiwan

- 豐樂雕塑公園
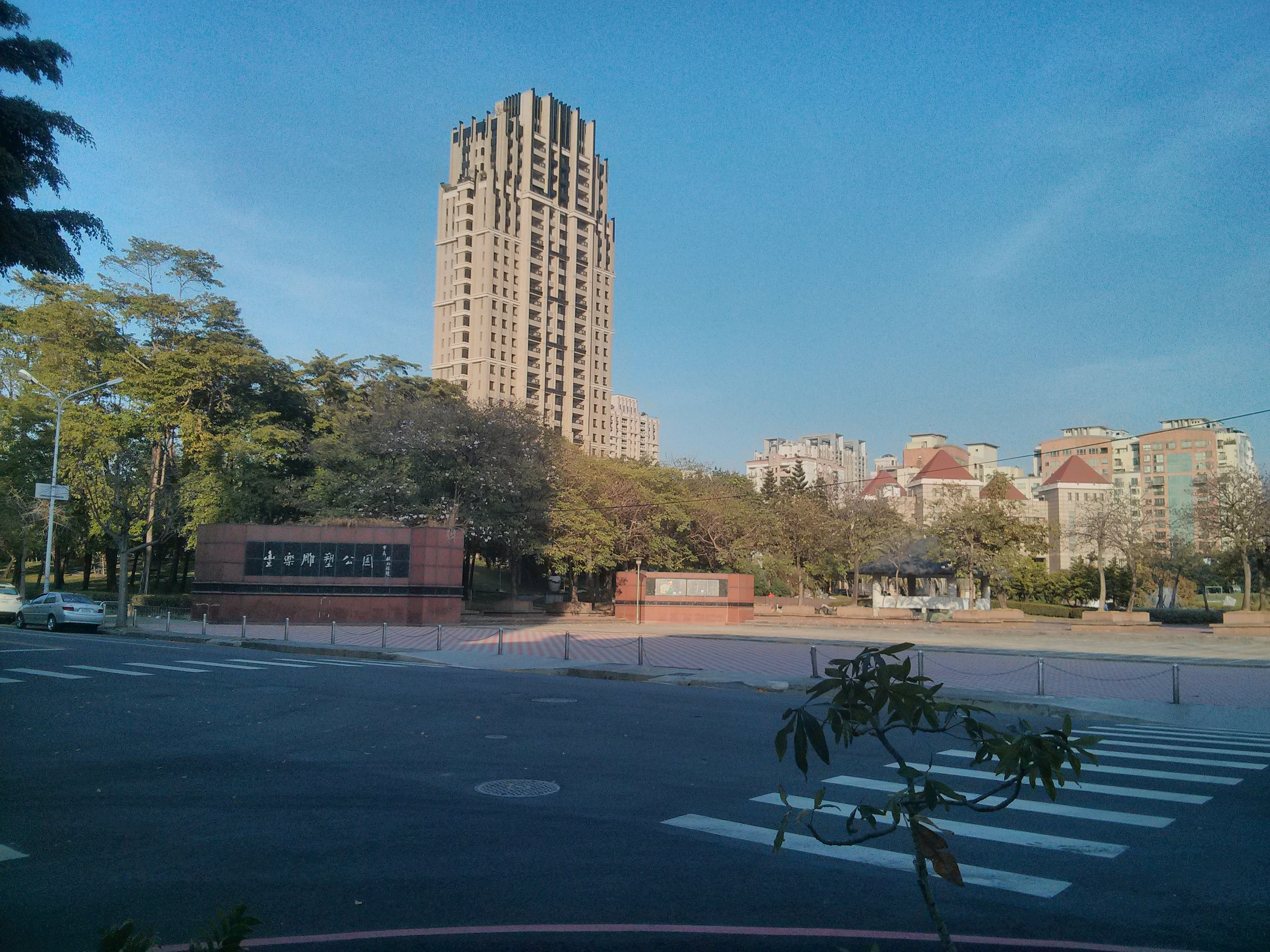
- Interactive map of Fengle Sculpture Park
- Type: urban park
- Location: Nantun, Taichung, Taiwan
- Coordinates: 24°07′51.1″N 120°38′33.8″E
- Area: 6 hectares (15 acres)
- Opened: 1994
- Public transit: Daqing Station

The Fengle Sculpture Park (traditional Chinese: 豐樂雕塑公園; simplified Chinese: 丰乐雕塑公园; pinyin: Fēnglè Diāosù Gōngyuán) is an urban park in Nantun District, Taichung, Taiwan.

== History ==
The park was opened in 1994.

== Architecture ==
The park spans over an area of 6 hectares. It features the 52 outdoor sculpture works.

== Transportation ==
The park is accessible within walking distance west of Feng-le Park metro station of Taichung MRT Green line or north-north-west of Daqing Station of Taiwan Railway.

== See also ==
- List of parks in Taiwan
