= Taichung Mosque =

Mosque in Nantun, Taichung, Taiwan

- 台中清真寺
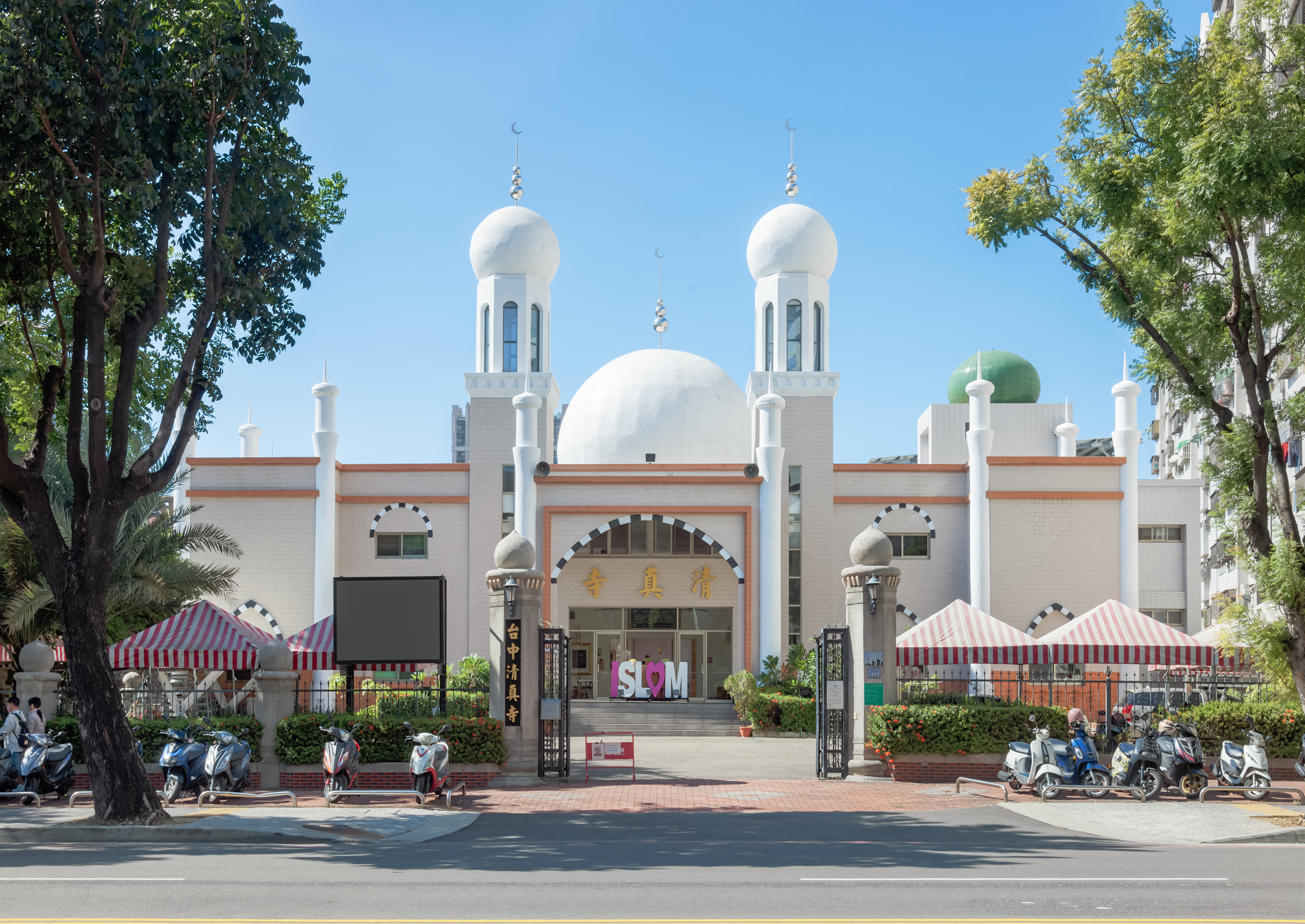
- The mosque in 2023

- Location of the mosque in Taichung

Religion
- Affiliation: Sunni Islam
- Ecclesiastical or organizational status: Mosque
- Status: Active

Location
- Location: 457 Dadun South Road, Nantun, Taichung
- Country: Taiwan
- Interactive map of Taichung Mosque
- Coordinates: 24°08′10″N 120°38′58″E

Architecture
- Type: Mosque
- Completed: 1951 (original); 1994 (current); 2010 (renovations)
- Construction cost: US$54,000

Specifications
- Dome: 1
- Minaret: 2

Chinese name
- Traditional Chinese: 台中清真寺
Transcriptions
Standard Mandarin
- Hanyu Pinyin: Táizhōng Qīngzhēnsì

The Taichung Mosque (Chinese: 台中清真寺; pinyin: Táizhōng Qīngzhēnsì) is a mosque on Dadun South Road in the Nantun District of Taichung, Taiwan.

== History ==
After fleeing Mainland China with the Nationalist Government at the end of Chinese Civil War in 1949, some Chinese Muslims resided in Tianzhong Township, Changhua County. To accommodate their need to pray, Muslims did their prayers in some homes. One notable house used for prayer was the house of Qi Yulao (耆于老). As their numbers grew bigger, such homes could no longer accommodate all of them.

=== 1951 structure ===
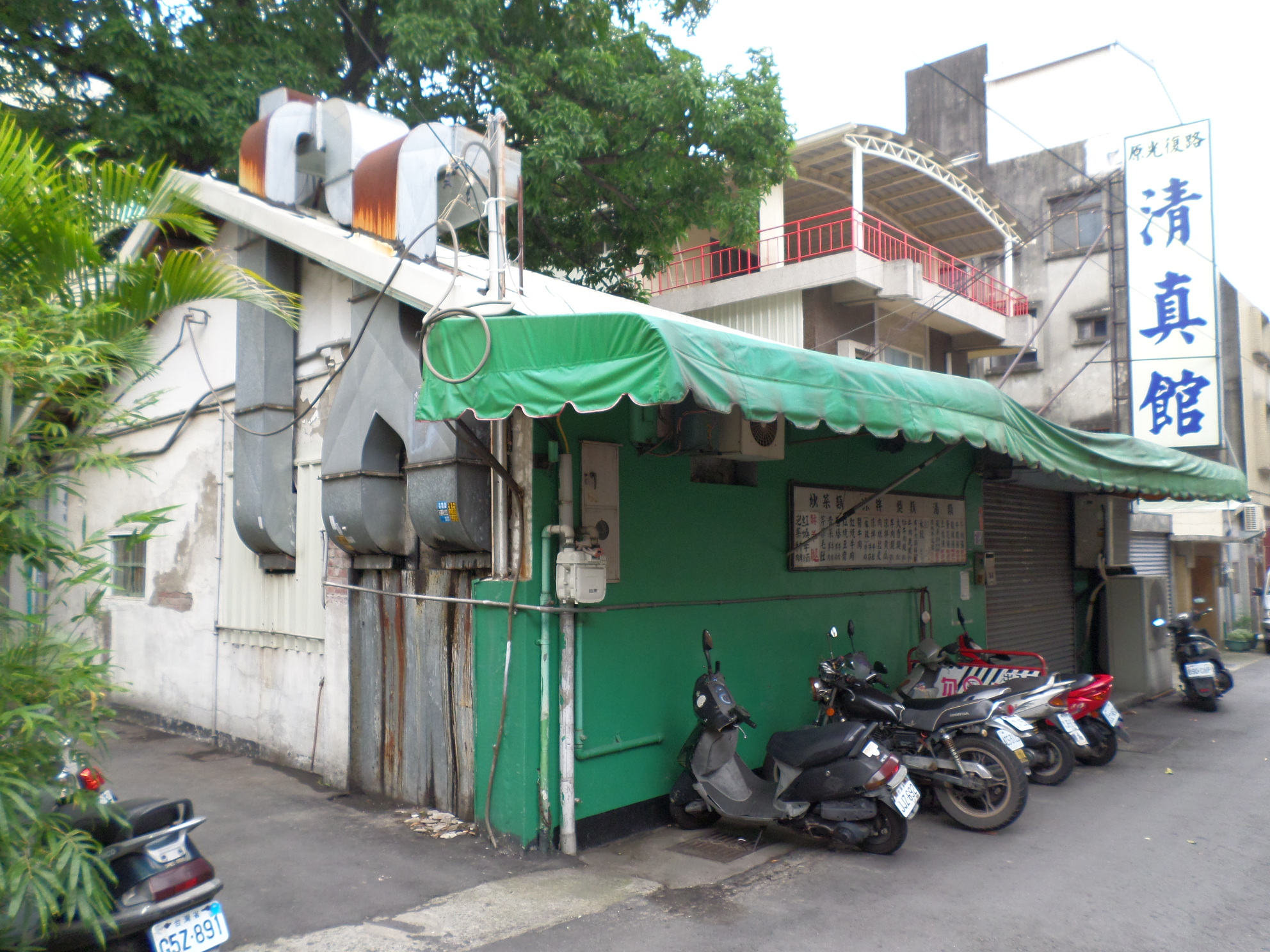
The 1951-mosque

The community started to plan to build a mosque in 1951 with funds raised from various sources, including from the Kingdom of Saudi Arabia. They chose the Japanese-style house at the No. 12, Lane 165, Zhongxiao Road (忠孝路), South District as the location for the Taichung Mosque. The mosque was 130 square metres (1,400 sq ft). In April 1975, the Saudi Minister of Transport visited the mosque and found it to be in complete disrepair. The Saudi government provided funds to the Chinese Muslim Association to establish a new Taichung Mosque at a new site.

=== 1994 structure ===
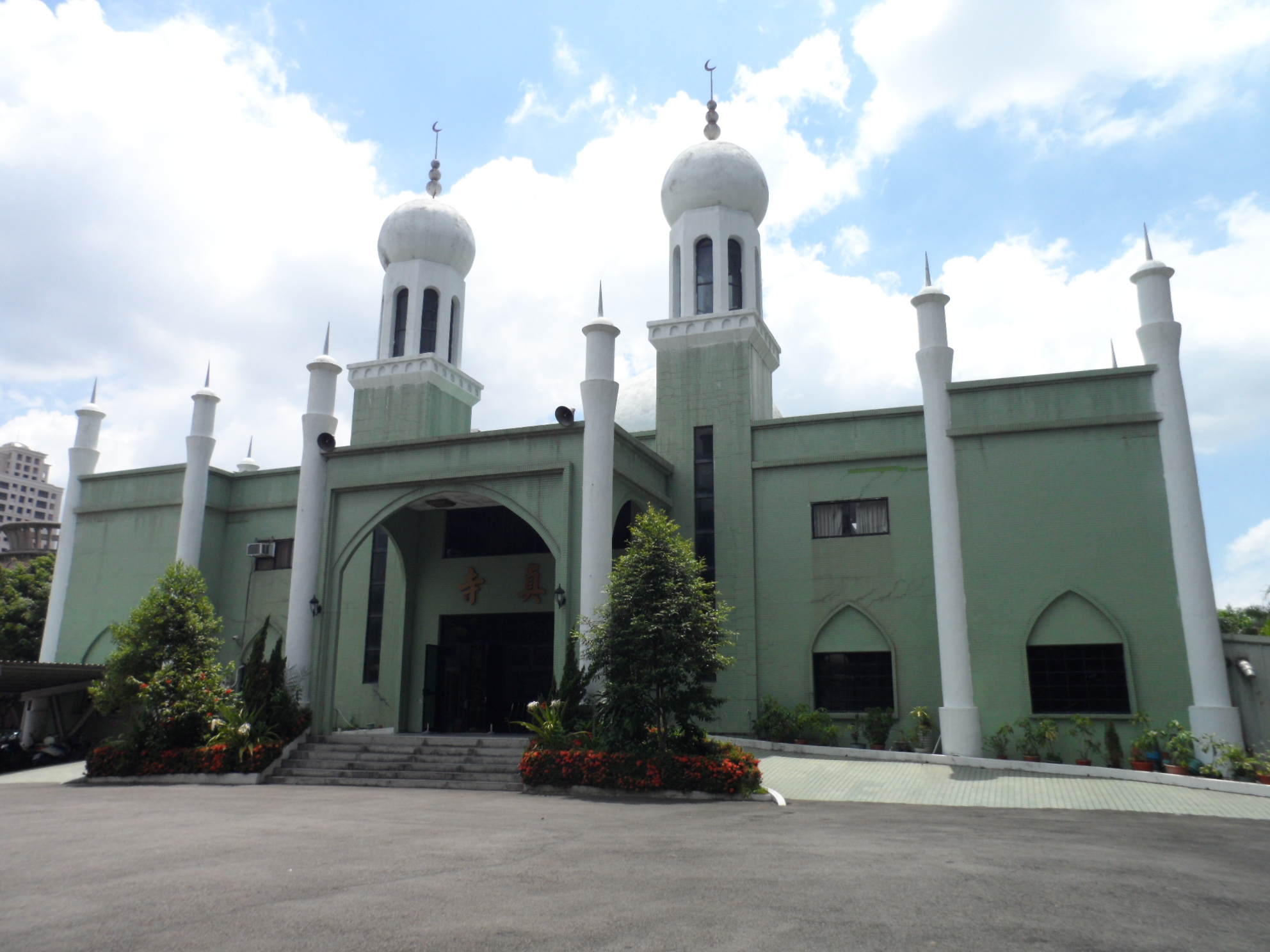
The mosque in 2013, prior to its 2020 renovation

The construction of the new mosque building started in 1988. Due to financial difficulties construction was temporarily halted until May 1989, before it proceeded again until August 1990. With additional buildings and hardware, the entire construction on Dadun South Road (大墩南路) was completed in 1994 at a cost of US$54,000.

Renovation plans were announced in September 2019, with the design based on Al-Masjid an-Nabawi, and the renovation was completed in June 2020.

On 29 September 2020, Chunghwa Post released stamps featuring the Taichung Mosque and the Taipei Grand Mosque with denomination of NT$28 and NT$15 respectively.

== Architecture ==
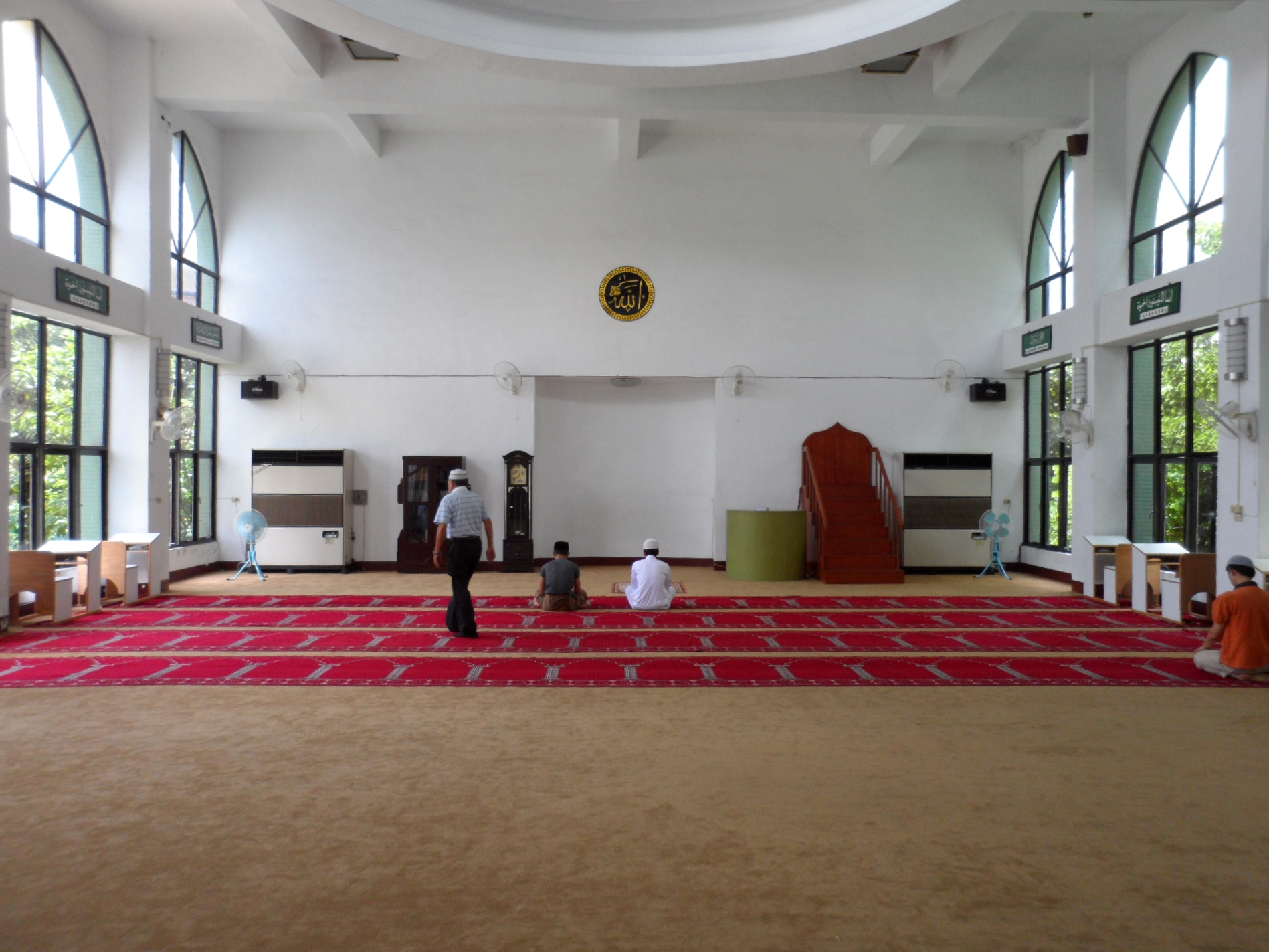
The mosque prayer hall

After the mosque board was elected in 1990, the mosque was expanded to include a three-storey building, Islamic shop, Islamic restaurant, suites and dormitories for imams, classrooms and Muslim cemetery.

== Activities ==
Five daily prayers are regularly held at the mosque, including the Eid prayers. The mosque library is used to host many activities to inform the general public about Islam.

In 1997, the mosque hired Shan Yaowu (閃耀武), a Chinese Muslim from Myanmar, as the imam of the mosque. He graduated from Al-Azhar University in Cairo, Egypt studying Islamic law. His duty was to conduct religious affairs and missionary activities. During his term, he vigorously promoted visionary works. He spent four years preaching over 50 Friday prayer sermons and then edited some of the sermons into books which were sent to each mosque throughout Taiwan.

In May 2003, the mosque hired Bao Xiaolin (保孝廉), a graduate from the Missionary Department of the Islamic University of Madinah in Saudi Arabia, as the vice president in charge of conducting religious affairs. He encouraged young Taiwanese Muslim to come to the mosque to study the Quran and Arabic during holidays and weekends. He worked tirelessly to improve Taichung Muslims' knowledge on Islamic culture.

== Transportation ==
The Taichung Mosque is within walking distance southeast of Nantun Station of Taichung MRT.

== See also ==
- Islam in Taiwan
- List of mosques in Taiwan
