= Nantun District =

District in Taichung, Taiwan

Coordinates: 24°8′29.7″N 120°38′15.8″E

Nantun 南屯區 Lâm-tūn, Nanton
- District
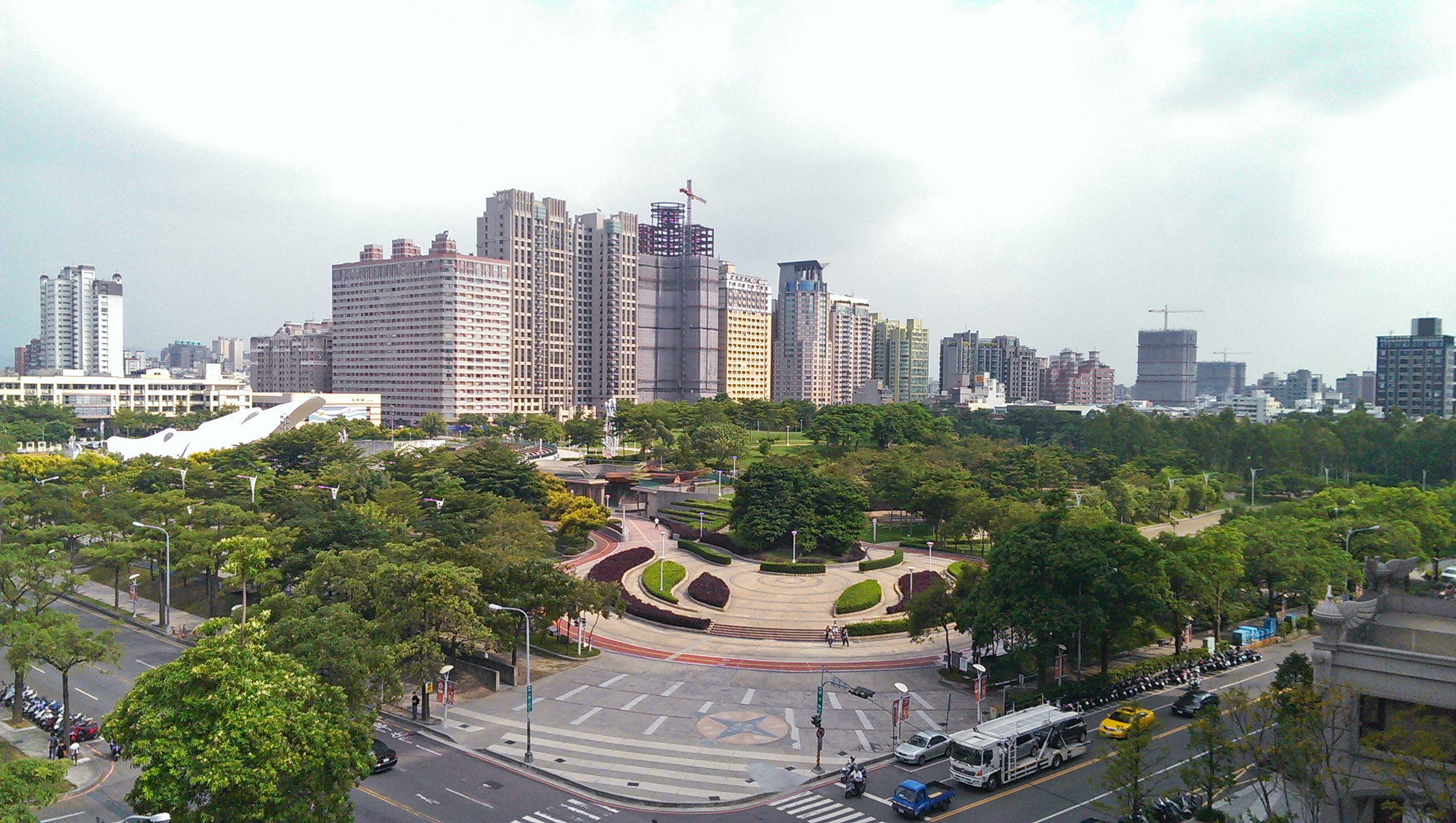
- Wen-Hsin Park in Nantun District

- Nantun District in Taichung City
- Location: Taichung, Taiwan

Area
  - Total: 31 km^{2} (12 sq mi)

Population (December 2024)
  - Total: 185,192
  - Density: 6,000/km^{2} (15,000/sq mi)
- Website: www.nantun.taichung.gov.tw (in Chinese)

Nantun District (Chinese: 南屯區; pinyin: Nántún Qū; Pe̍h-ōe-jī: Lâm-tūn-khu; lit. 'southern settlement') is an urban district in Taichung, Taiwan. It was a part of Taichung before the City and County were amalgamated in 2010. The district has seen rapid growth in recent years with department store and office towers in the 7th redevelopment zone.

== History ==
The district used to be part of Taichung provincial city before the merger with Taichung County to form Taichung special municipality on 25 December 2010.

Nantun is home to Liming New Village, a planned community containing multiple government offices.

== Population ==
Population Changes in Nantun District from 1951 to Present. View chart definition.

== Transportation ==
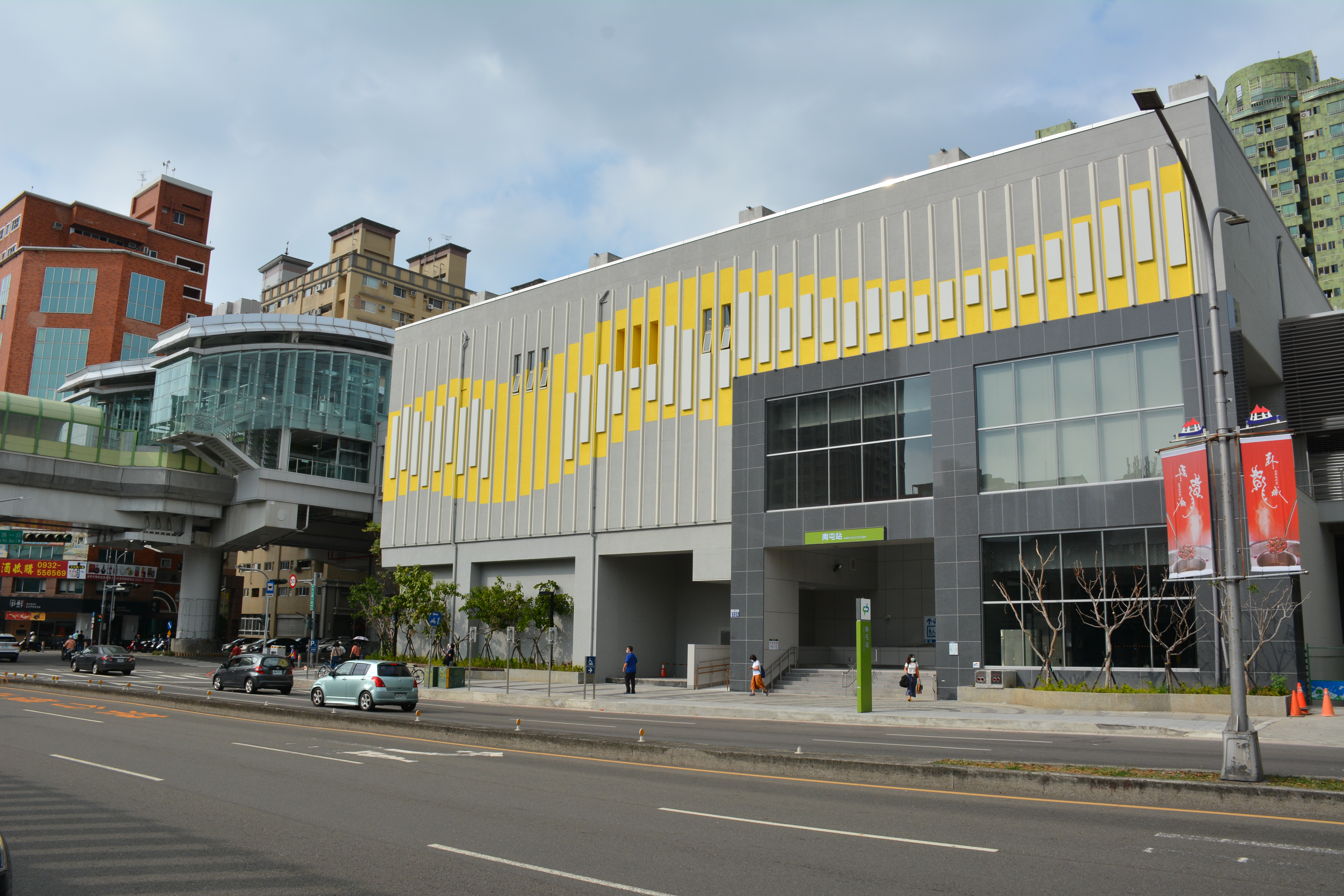
Nantun Station of Taichung MRT

- Feng-le Park, Jiuzhangli, Nantun, Shui'an Temple and Wenxin Forest Park Stations of Taichung MRT

== Administrative divisions ==
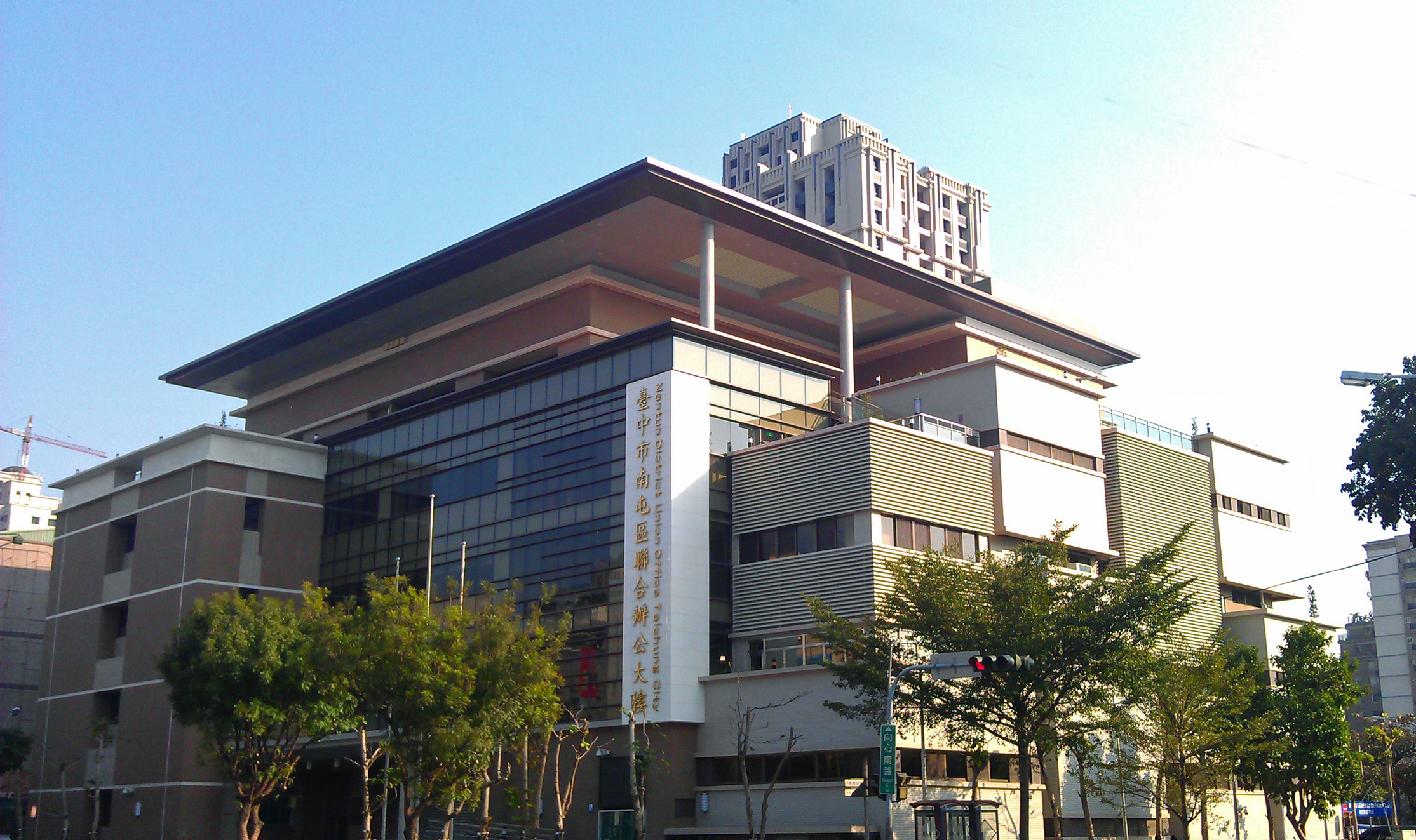
Nantun District Office

Nantun, Fengle, Fengshu, Zhonghe, Zengping, Chunshe, Chunan, Wenshan, Baoshan, Xinsheng, Yongding, Sancuo, Sanyi, Sanhe, Liming, Gouqi, Daye, Huizhong, Tianxin, Xiangxin, Wenxin, Tongxin, Datong, Daxing and Dacheng Village.

== Government institutions ==
- National Land Surveying and Mapping Center
- Water Resources Agency

== Education ==
- Ling Tung University

== Tourist attractions ==
- Fengle Sculpture Park
- Fulfillment Amphitheater
- Ling Tung Numismatic Museum
- Rainbow Village
- Taichung Mosque
