= Dakeng =

Area in Beitun, Taichung, Taiwan

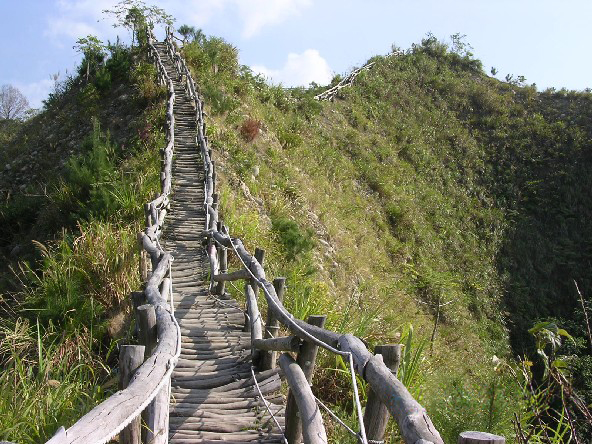
Dakeng

Dakeng (traditional Chinese: 大坑, Hanyu Pinyin: dàkēng) is an area that contains most of the mountain region of Beitun District in Taichung, Taiwan.

== Hiking and biking trails ==
Dakeng boasts a variety of mountain biking and hiking trails, which are managed by the Taichung City Government. A total of ten hiking trails exist, varying in difficulty, with trails 6–10 being more flat and suitable for beginners, while trails 1–5 are more vertical and pose more of a challenge. Trails 1–5 include sections with log steps, with ropes on both sides to help support hikers.

== Guanyin Mountain ==
Dakeng is home to the Guanyin Temple on Guanyin Mountain, located near Central Taiwan University of Science and Technology, on Bu Zi Road. The mountain peak offers a view of Beitun District.

== See also ==
- List of tourist attractions in Taiwan
