= Beitun Main Station =

Metro station in Taichung, Taiwan

Beitun Main Station 北屯總站
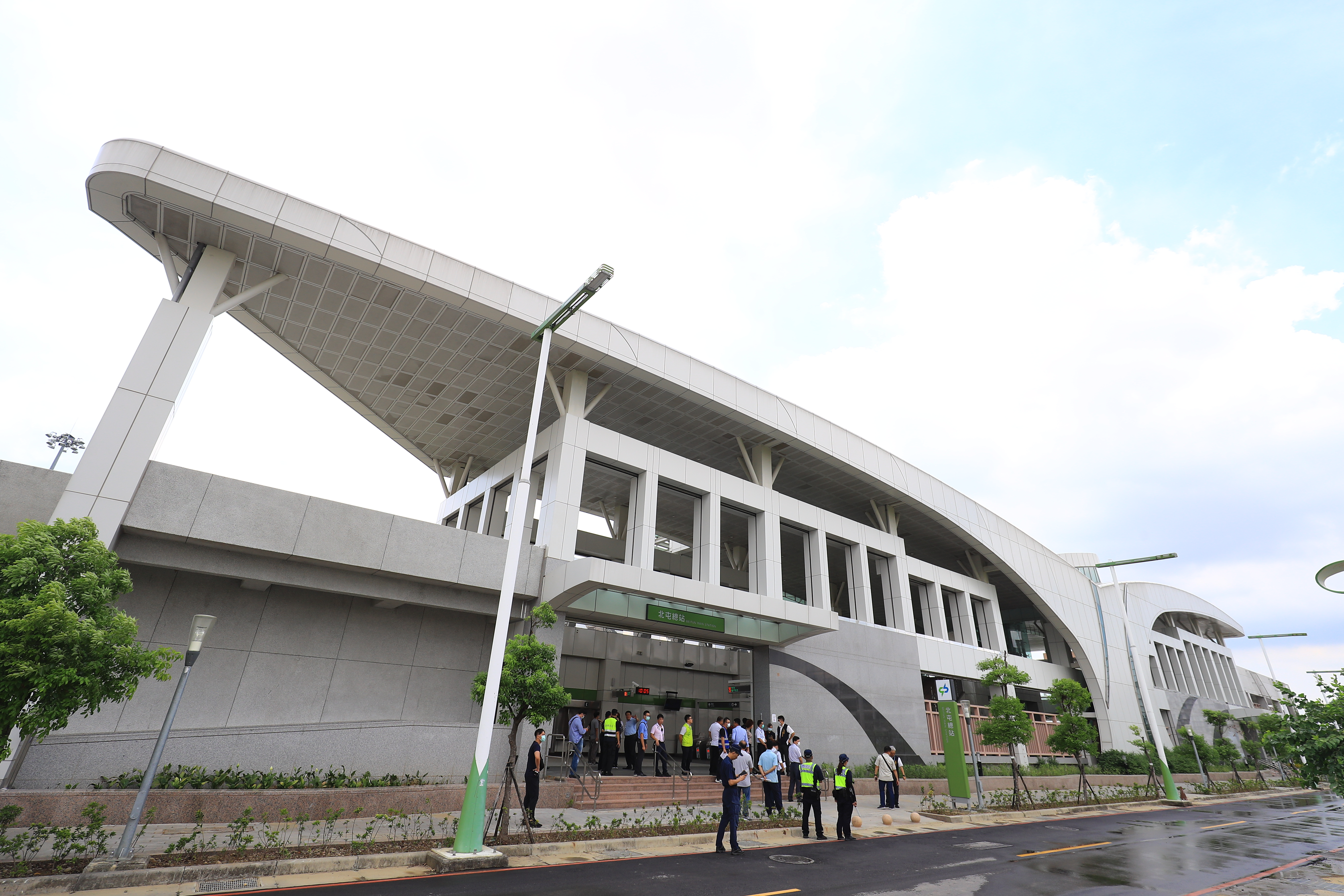

General information
- Location: Beitun, Taichung; Taiwan
- Coordinates: 24°11′7″N 120°42′34″E
- Operator: Taichung MRT
- Line: Green line
- Platforms: 2 side platforms

Construction
- Structure type: At-grade

Other information
- Station code: 103a

History
- Opened: 25 April 2021

Services
Preceding station	Taichung MRT	Following station
Jiushe towards HSR Taichung Station	Green line	Terminus
Location
- Location within Taiwan

Beitun Main Station
- Chinese: 北屯總站
Transcriptions
Standard Mandarin
- Hanyu Pinyin: Běitún Zǒngzhàn
- Bopomofo: ㄅㄟˇ ㄊㄨㄣˊ ㄗㄨㄥˇ ㄓㄢˋ
- Tongyong Pinyin: Běitún Zǒngjhàn

Beitun Main Station (Chinese: 北屯總站) is a metro station operated by Taichung MRT located in Beitun District, Taichung, Taiwan. It is the eastern terminus of the Green line, and is located near the depot of the entire line.

== Around the station ==
Beitun Main station is located within a new development zone. With the construction of the new station, the surrounding area saw rapid development, including a planned Costco store.

== Station structure ==
2F	Crossover level	Platforms-connecting overpass
G
G	Side platform
G	Track 1	Green line termination platform
G	Track 2	Green line: towards Taichung HSR Station (Jiushe)
G	Side platform, doors will open on the right
G	Concourse	Exit/entrance, lobby, information desk, automatic ticket dispensing machines, one-way faregates
