= Taichung HSR station =

Railway station in Taichung, Taiwan

Taichung 台中
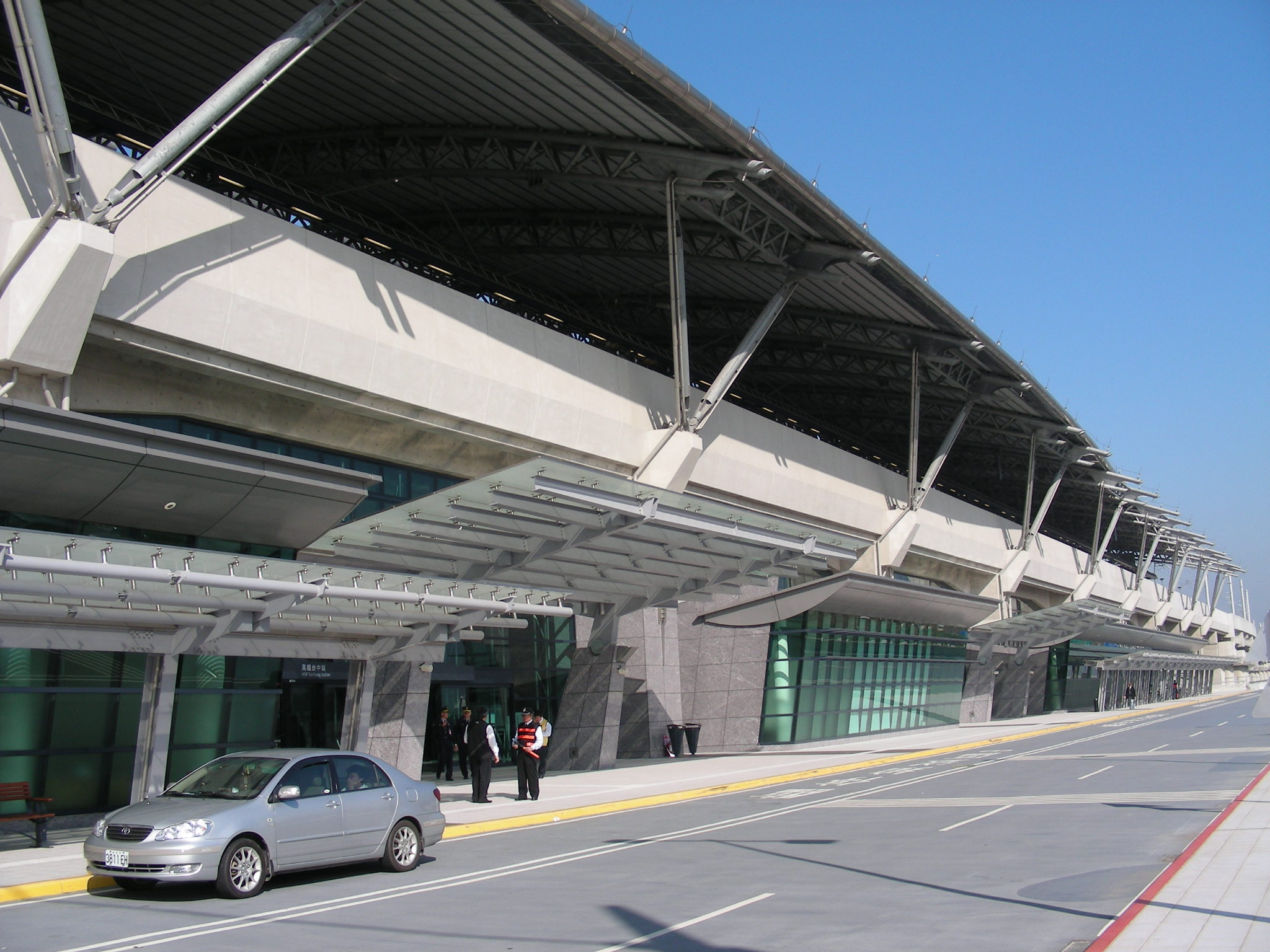

Chinese name
- Traditional Chinese: 台中
Transcriptions
Standard Mandarin
- Hanyu Pinyin: Táizhōng Gāotiě Zhàn
- Bopomofo: ㄊㄞˊ ㄓㄨㄥ
Hakka
- Romanization: Tǒi-zóng (Sixian dialect); Toi-zhùng (Hailu dialect)
Southern Min
- Tâi-lô: Tâi-tiong

General information
- Location: 8 Zhanqu 2nd Rd; Wuri District, Taichung; Taiwan
- Coordinates: 24.1117°N 120.6161°E
- System: THSR railway station
- Line: THSR
- Distance: 165.6 km
- Connections: Conventional rail; Local bus; Coach

Construction
- Structure type: Elevated

Other information
- Station code: TAC／07
- Website: www.thsrc.com.tw/en/StationInfo/Prospect/4b80429e-2b1a-429d-93ab-6870d49cab03

History
- Opened: January 5, 2007

Passengers
- 2018: 22.115 million per year ▲5.45%
- Rank: 2 out of 12

Services
Preceding station	Taiwan High Speed Rail	Following station
Miaoli towards Nangang	THSR	Changhua towards Zuoying
Location
- Location within Taiwan

HSR Taichung station 119 高鐵臺中站
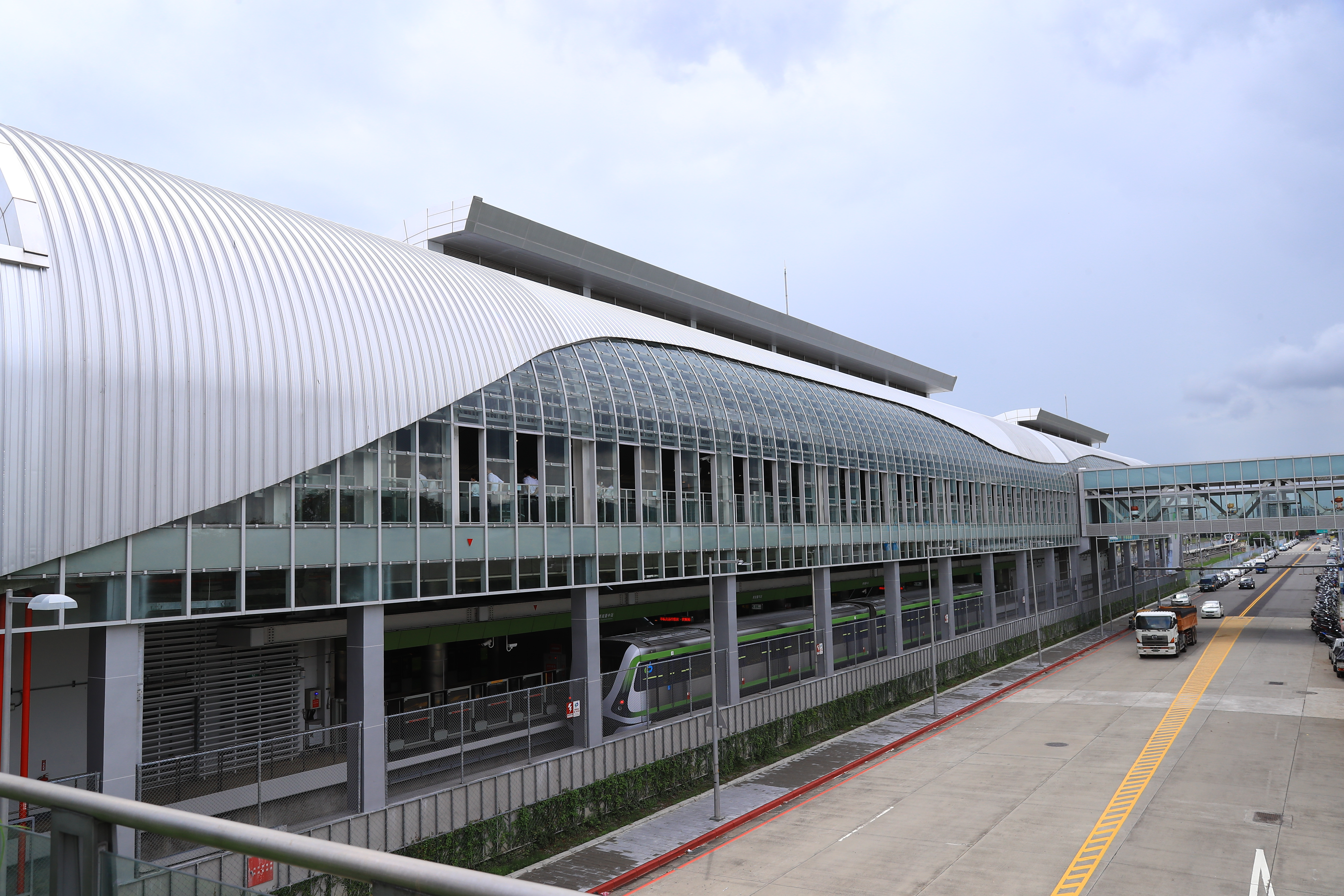

General information
- Location: Wuri, Taichung; Taiwan
- Operator: Taichung MRT
- Line: Green line
- Platforms: 2 side platforms

Construction
- Structure type: At-grade

Other information
- Station code: 119

History
- Opened: 25 April 2021

Services
Preceding station	Taichung MRT	Following station
Terminus	Green line	Wuri towards Beitun Main
Location

Taichung HSR (Chinese: 台中高鐵站; pinyin: Táizhōng Gāotiě Zhàn) is a railway and metro station in Wuri District, Taichung, Taiwan. It is served by Taiwan High Speed Rail and the Green line of the Taichung MRT. The station is adjacent to Xinwuri station of Taiwan Railway.

== History ==
The design of the station was carried out by HOY Architects, a Taipei-based firm. Construction took four years and $5 billion NTD, making it the most expensive station at the time of its opening.

Prior to the opening of Miaoli, Changhua and Yunlin HSR stations in December 2015, this was the only operational high speed rail station in Central Taiwan.

== Overview ==
The station is elevated and has two island platforms. Since all services stop at this station, the passing tracks located between platforms are rarely used to connect trains with the depot to the south. The station has a total area of 12 hectares (120,000 m^{2}).

Due to the location of the station, it can serve not only residents of Taichung, but also those living in the northern part of Changhua County in central Changhua. In addition, the development of Taichung has become increasingly prosperous in recent years. Since 2011, the number of passengers entering/exiting from Taichung HSR station has surpassed the number of passengers enter/exiting from Zuoying HSR station, and this growth continues to accelerate.

== Station layout ==
3F	Platform 1A	THSR toward Zuoying (Changhua)
3F	Island platform
3F	Platform 1B	THSR toward Zuoying (Changhua)
3F	Passing track	THSR through service
3F	Passing track	THSR through service
3F	Platform 2A	THSR toward Nangang (Miaoli)
3F	Island platform
3F	Platform 2B	THSR toward Nangang (Miaoli)

2F	Lobby	Entrance/exit, information desk, tourism counter, shops Ticketing, automatic ticket machines, faregates, waiting area Restrooms, nursery
2F	Lobby	Passageway (with TRA Xinwuri Station)

Street level	Outside area	Parking lot, buses, transfers, taxi stand Drop-off area

== MRT service ==
The Taichung MRT is available through an out-of-station transfer. It is the western terminus of the Green line.

The HSR concourse can be reached via a bridge through Xinwuri railway station.

== HSR services ==
HSR services 1xx, (1)2xx, (1)3xx, (1)5xx, (1)6xx, and (8)8xx call at this station, making this the HSR station with the most services, and the only HSR station with all services.

== Around the station ==
- Xinwuri railway station
- Dadu River
- Greater Taichung International Expo Center
- National Freeway 1
- National Freeway 3
- Provincial Highway 74

== Gallery ==
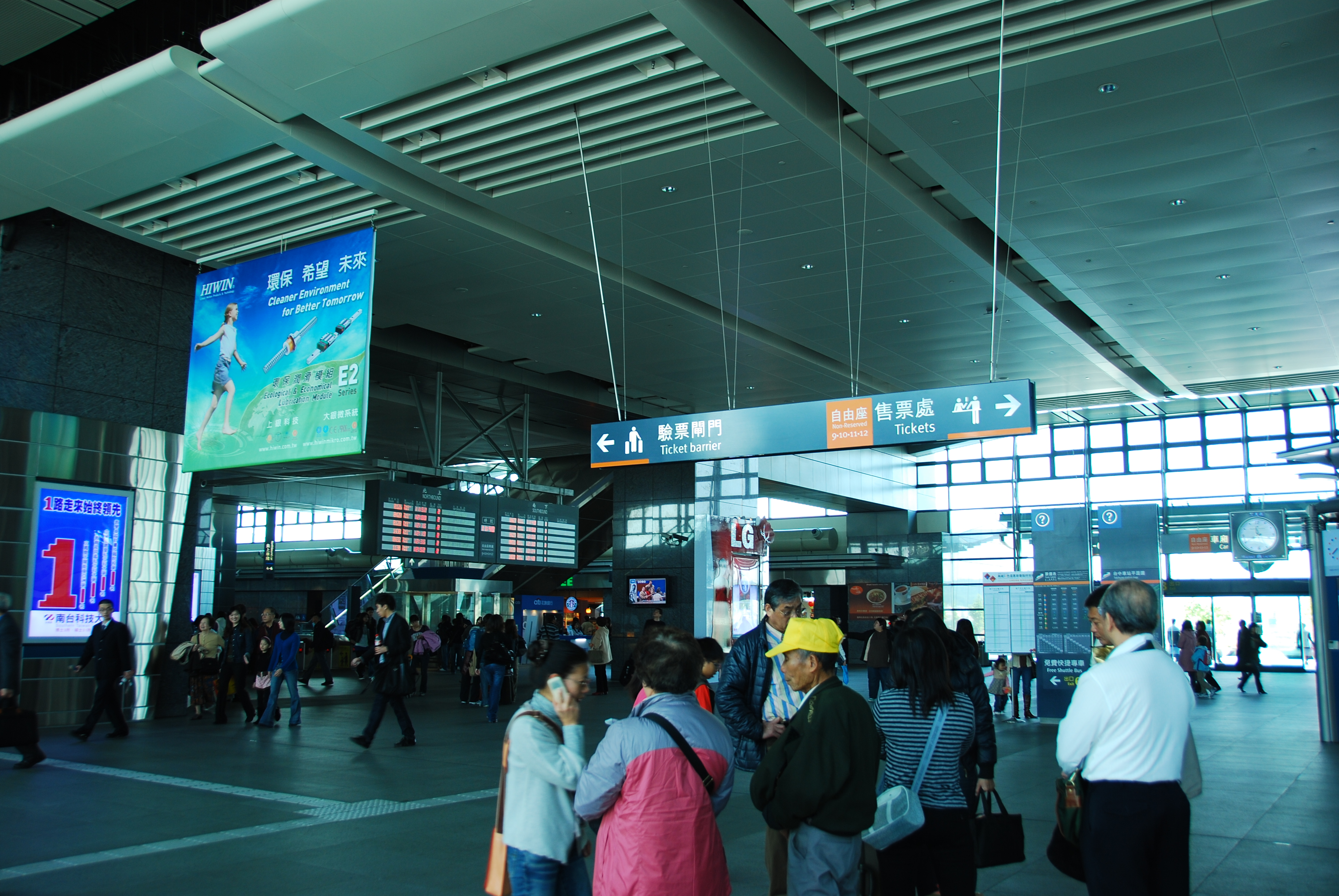
THSR Taichung station lobby

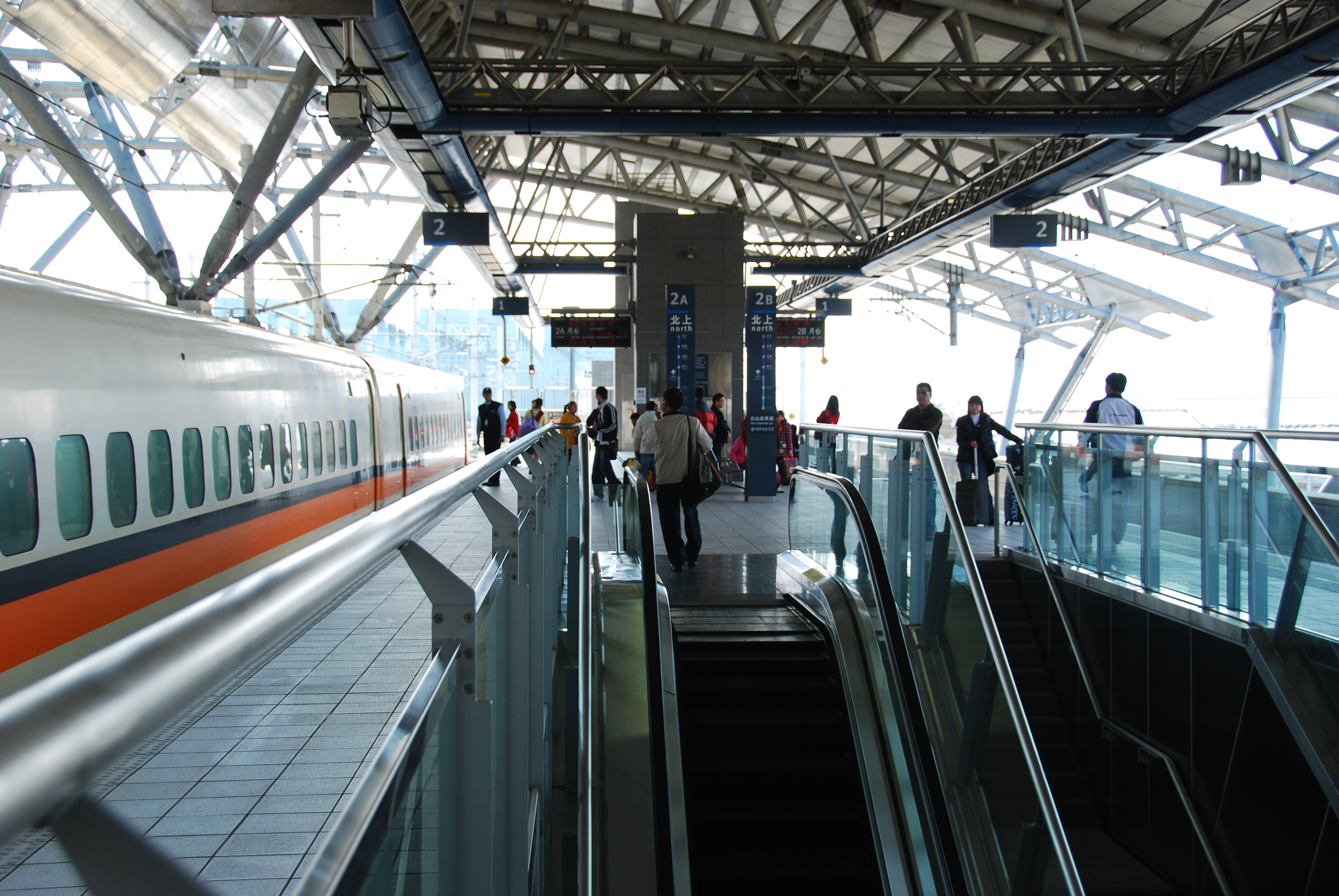
THSR Taichung station northbound platforms

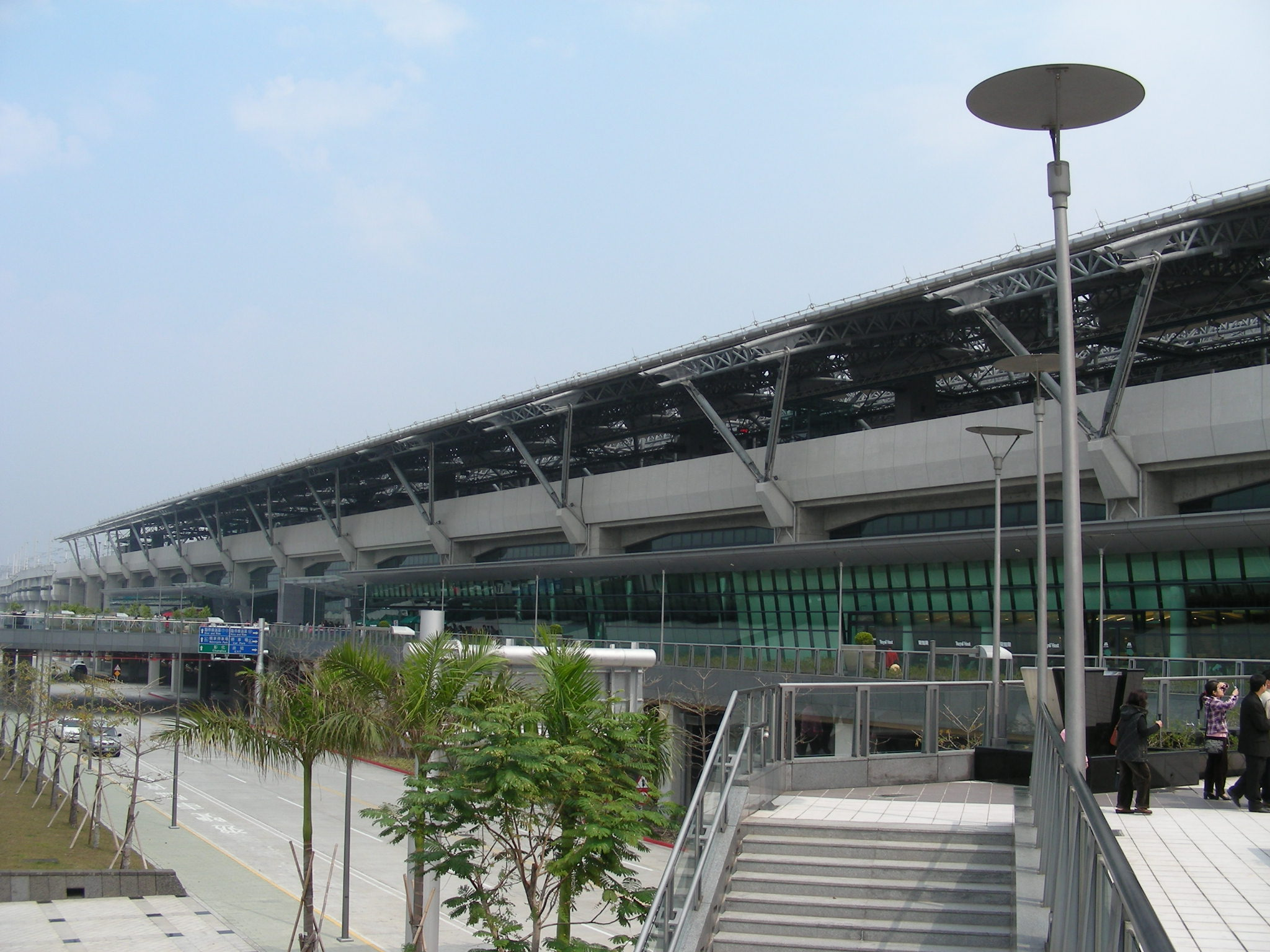
THSR Taichung station exterior
