= Taichung MRT =

Metro rail system in Taichung, Taiwan

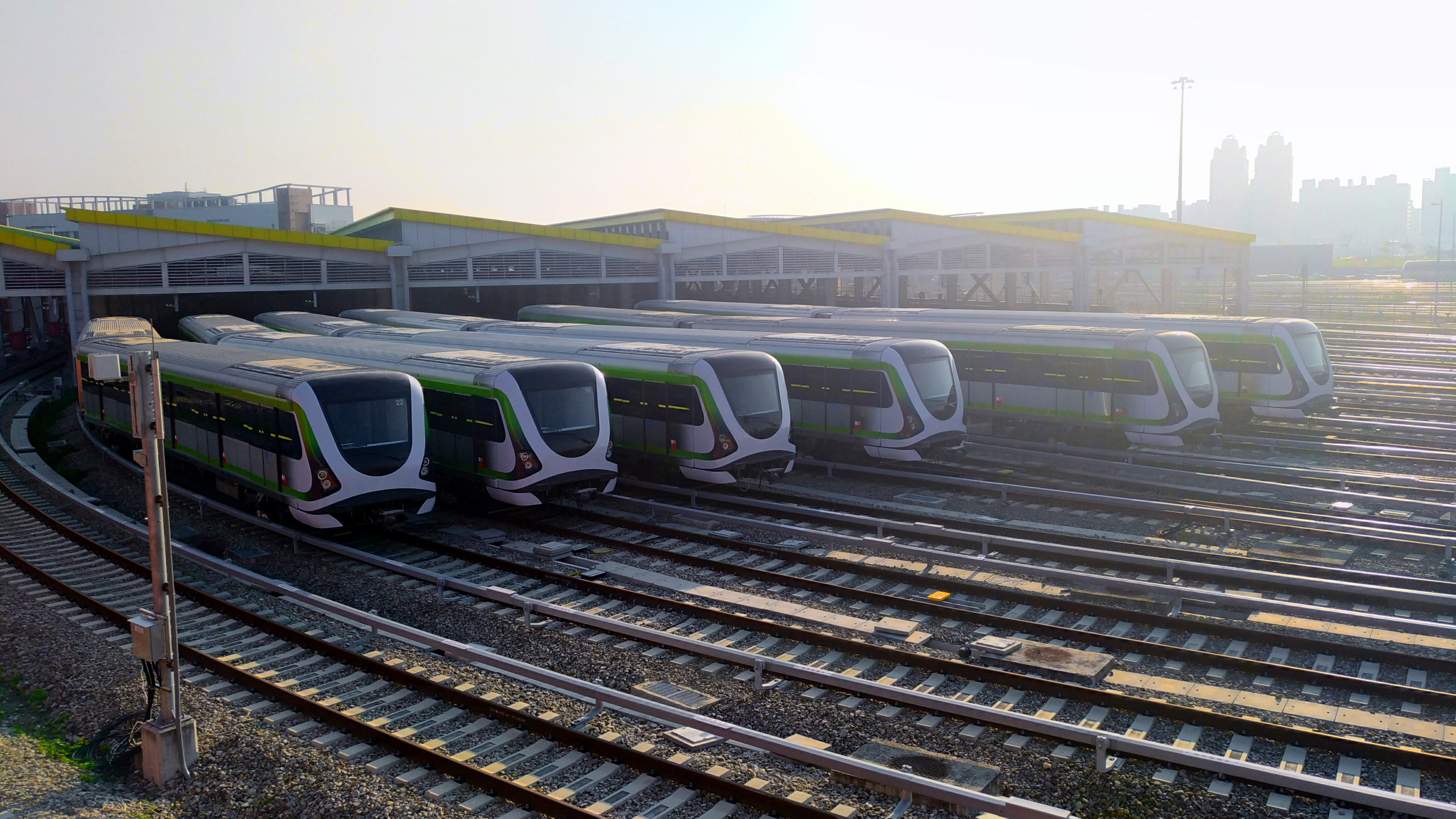
- Trains at Beitun Depot

Overview
- Native name: 臺中捷運
- Owner: Taichung City Government
- Locale: Taichung
- Transit type: Light metro, rapid transit
- Number of lines: 1
- Number of stations: 18
- Daily ridership: 49,645 (August 2026)
- Annual ridership: 17,221,603 (2025)
- Website: https://www.tmrt.com.tw/

Operation
- Began operation: April 25, 2021; 5 years ago
- Operator: Taichung Mass Rapid Transit Corporation

Technical
- System length: 16.71 km (10.38 mi)
- Track gauge: 1,435 mm (4 ft 8 1/2 in)

Taichung MRT
- Traditional Chinese: 臺中捷運
- Simplified Chinese: 台中捷运
Transcriptions
Standard Mandarin
- Hanyu Pinyin: Táizhōng Jiéyùn
- Bopomofo: ㄊㄞˊ ㄓㄨㄥ ㄐ一ㄝˊ ㄩㄣˋ
- Wade–Giles: T'ai^{2}-chung^{1} Chieh^{2}-yün^{4}
- Tongyong Pinyin: Táijhong Jiéyùn
Southern Min
- Hokkien POJ: Tâi-tiong Chia̍t-ūn

Taichung Mass Rapid Transit
- Traditional Chinese: 臺中都會區大眾捷運系統
- Simplified Chinese: 台中都会区大众捷运系统
- Literal meaning: Taichung Metropolitan Area Mass Rapid Transit System
Transcriptions
Standard Mandarin
- Hanyu Pinyin: Táizhōng Dūhuìqū Dàzhòng Jiéyùn Xìtǒng
- Bopomofo: ㄊㄞˊ ㄓㄨㄥ ㄉㄨ ㄏㄨㄟˋ ㄑㄩ ㄉㄚˋ ㄓㄨㄥˋ ㄐ一ㄝˊ ㄩㄣˋ ㄒ一ˋ ㄊㄨㄥˇ
- Wade–Giles: T'ai^{2}-chung^{1} Tu^{1}-hui^{4}-ch'ü^{1} Ta^{4}-chung^{4} Chieh^{2}-yün^{4} Hsi^{4}-t'ung^{3}
- Tongyong Pinyin: Táijhong Duhuèicyu Dàjhòng Jiéyùn Sìtǒng
Southern Min
- Hokkien POJ: Tâi-tiong To·-hōe-khu Toā-chiòng Chia̍t-ūn Hē-thóng

The Taichung MRT (TMRT; also called Taichung Mass Rapid Transit or Taichung Metro) is a medium-capacity rapid transit system in Taichung, Taiwan. Taichung MRT's first route, the Green line, officially began operation on April 25, 2021, making it the 5th rapid transit system operating in Taiwan.

== History ==
Planning of the Taichung MRT started in 1990 with a study conducted by the Taiwanese Bureau of Housing and Urban Development. The study was completed in 1998 and suggested the implementation of three routes (Red, Green, and Blue). The project was formally approved by the Executive Yuan of the ROC government on November 23, 2004. The city government signed a joint development contract with the Taipei City Government on December 12, 2007.

Meanwhile, the Taichung City Government started their own planning of more lines and decided that the much cheaper BRT system would be the future of mass transit in Taichung. Since the corridor of the originally proposed Red line was partially served by TRA commuter services, the Blue line corridor was chosen as a first step to implement BRT in Taichung.

Construction of the first line, the Green line, had been paid for and was expected to begin in October 2007, though it was pushed back and started construction on October 8, 2009. The 16.7 km (10.4 mi) section of the Green line was scheduled for completion by 2020 and includes 18 stations.

On March 9, 2011, Kawasaki Heavy Industries announced that it had won a joint order with Alstom Transport SA (France) and CTCI Corp. (Taiwan) to supply 36 units consisting of two-car, driverless trains totaling 29.5 billion yen. While Kawasaki will oversee construction, Alstom will focus on signaling and CTCI will supply the electrical system.

On November 16, 2020, the Green line started trial runs. The first day of trial runs attracted more than 70,000 rides. The trial runs were suspended on November 21, 2020, when a railway coupler snapped in half. On March 10, 2021, Taichung Mayor Lu Shiow-yen announced that trial runs would resume on March 25, and the opening ceremony would be a month after. The Green line officially began operation as scheduled on April 25, 2021.

On April 29, 2025, the Taichung City Government announced that the Blue line would begin electromechanical construction in June of that year, with urban planning work completing by the end of the year. Construction officially began on June 26, 2025.

== Network ==
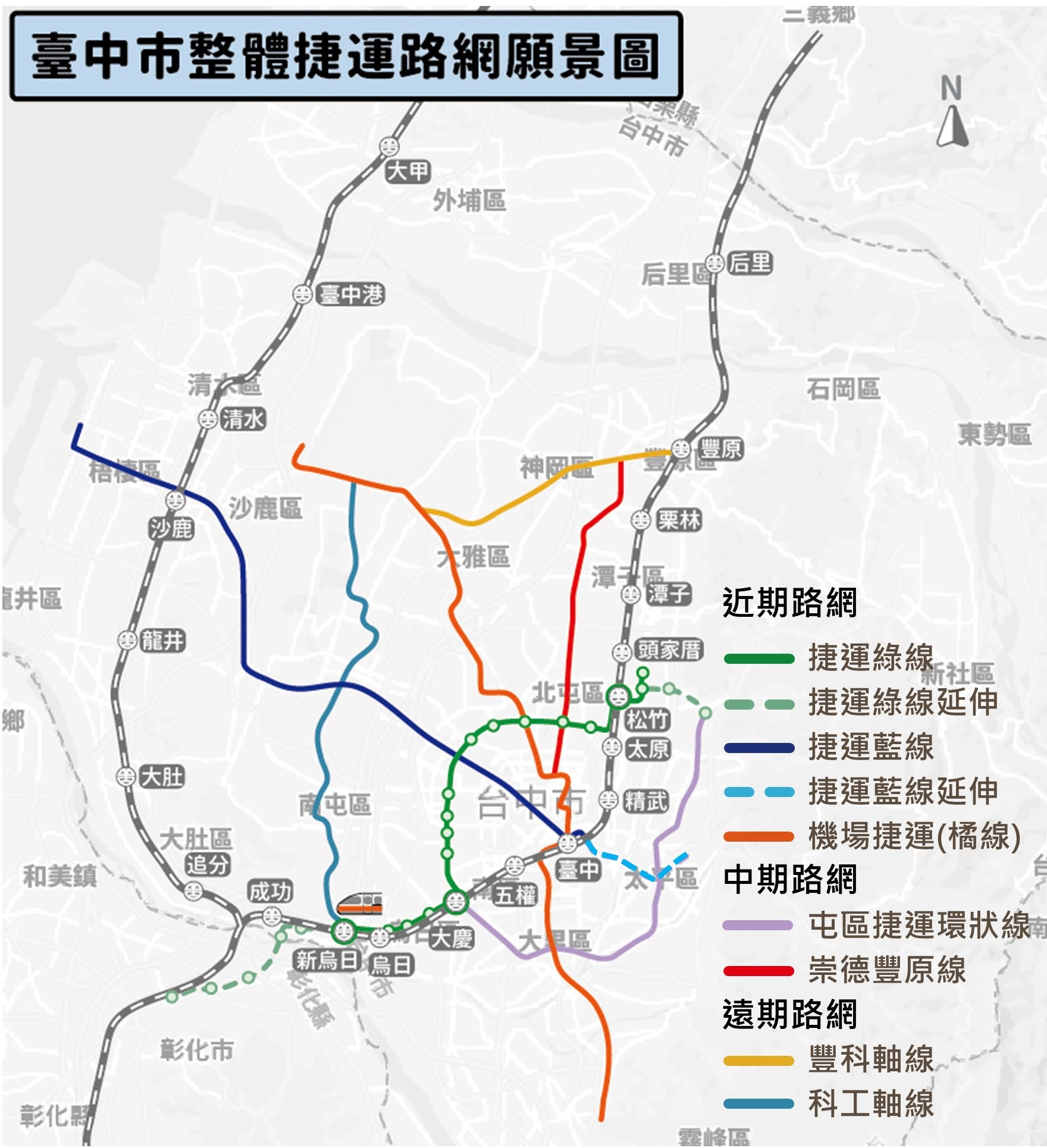
Map of proposed network

Line		Mode	Terminals (district)		Length km	Stations
Green line	Wuri-Wenxin-Beitun line	Medium-capacity	HSR Taichung (Wuri)	Beitun Main (Beitun)	16.7	18

=== Green line ===
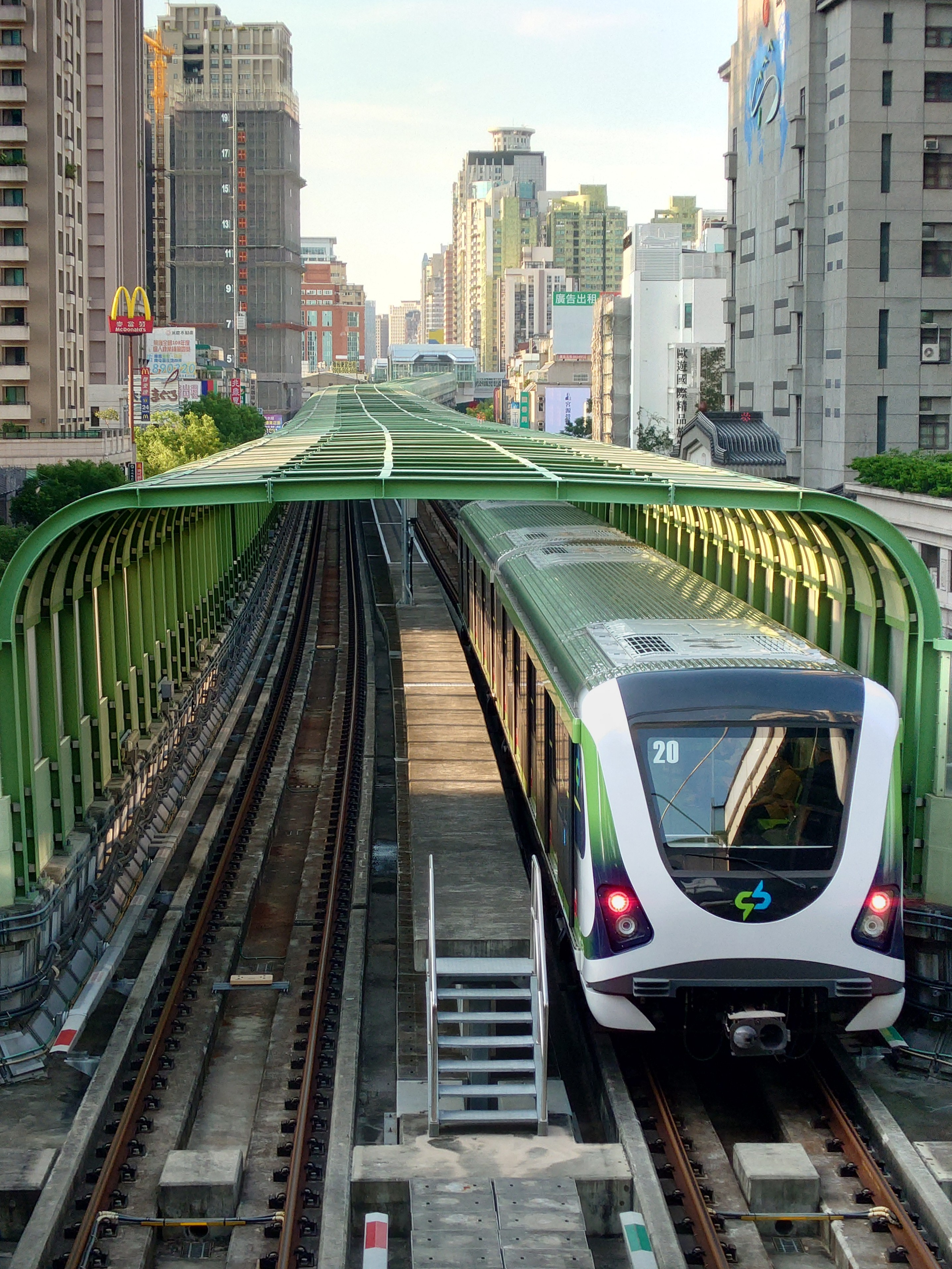
Green line seen from Feng-le Park metro station

The Green line between Beitun and Wuri is an elevated railway with driverless electric trains. The route is 16.5 km (10.3 mi) long and contains 18 stations. It stretches from Beitun Main Station on Songzhu Road in Beitun District along Beitun Road, Wenxin Road, and Wenxin South Road to the Taichung HSR station in Wuri District. It was expected to cost NT$53.491 billion and was built by the Taipei City Department of Rapid Transit Systems. In 2011, the planned total cost for the project was NT$51.39 billion (including land acquisition costs), split between the local and central governments.

The Green line began trial operation on November 16, 2020, and was supposed to start formal operations on December 19, 2020. The trial run was suspended on November 19, 2020, when a railway coupler snapped in half. The trial resumed on March 25, 2021, and the line officially opened on April 25, 2021.

== Fares ==
As of 2020, fares for the Taichung MRT start at NT$20 and are capped at NT$50. The fare increases by NT$5 for every 2 kilometres (1.2 mi) traveled.

== Future expansion ==
Line		Mode	Terminus	km	Total km	Status
Green line	Changhua Extension	Rapid transit	HSR Taichung - Changmei Road	5.53	24.7	Planned
Green line	Dakeng Extension	Rapid transit	Jiushe - Yuanshan New Village	2.49	24.7	Planned
Blue line		Rapid transit	Port of Taichung - New Jianguo Market	24.8	24.8	Under construction
Orange line		Rapid transit	Taichung Airport - Wufeng	29.27	29.27	Planned
Purple line		Rapid transit	Yuanshan New Village - Daqing	15.7	15.7	Planned
Red line		Rapid transit	Shepi - Shin Min High School	11.3	11.3	Planned

=== Blue line ===
In 2014, the Blue line began service as a BRT system running between Providence University and Taichung railway station. BRT service ended on July 8, 2015. A proposal for the Blue line MRT was approved by the Ministry of Transportation and Communications in late January 2024. Construction of the Blue line is expected to take ten years, and cost NT$161.51 billion, of which NT$67.56 billion was to be funded by the Executive Yuan. The planned Blue line is to start at the Port of Taichung, travel eastward through Shalu and Xitun, before terminating in central Taichung at the New Jianguo Market. Construction began in 2025 and was expected to take nine years.

=== Orange line ===
A fourth line was planned in 2009 to connect the city with Taichung Airport. However, after multiple proposals to build a MRT and BRT line were rejected by the Ministry of Transportation and Communications, the city government turned to an LRT system. While the system was still being planned, they switched to a MRT system again. In 2019, MRT project substituted for LRT project. In 2021, LRT project switched back to the original MRT project again.

Kenan Aiqin Bridge (科湳愛琴橋), which crosses over National Freeway 1 and Provincial Highway 74, has a space on the center median allocated for the line.

=== Red line ===
The Red line is being planned.

=== Purple line ===
The Purple line is being planned.

== Passengers ==
View source data.

== See also ==
- Rail transport in Taiwan
- Transport in Taiwan
