= Taichung Municipal Taichung Industrial High School =

Coordinates: 24°6′58.3″N 120°39′41.2″E

- 臺中市立臺中工業高級中等學校
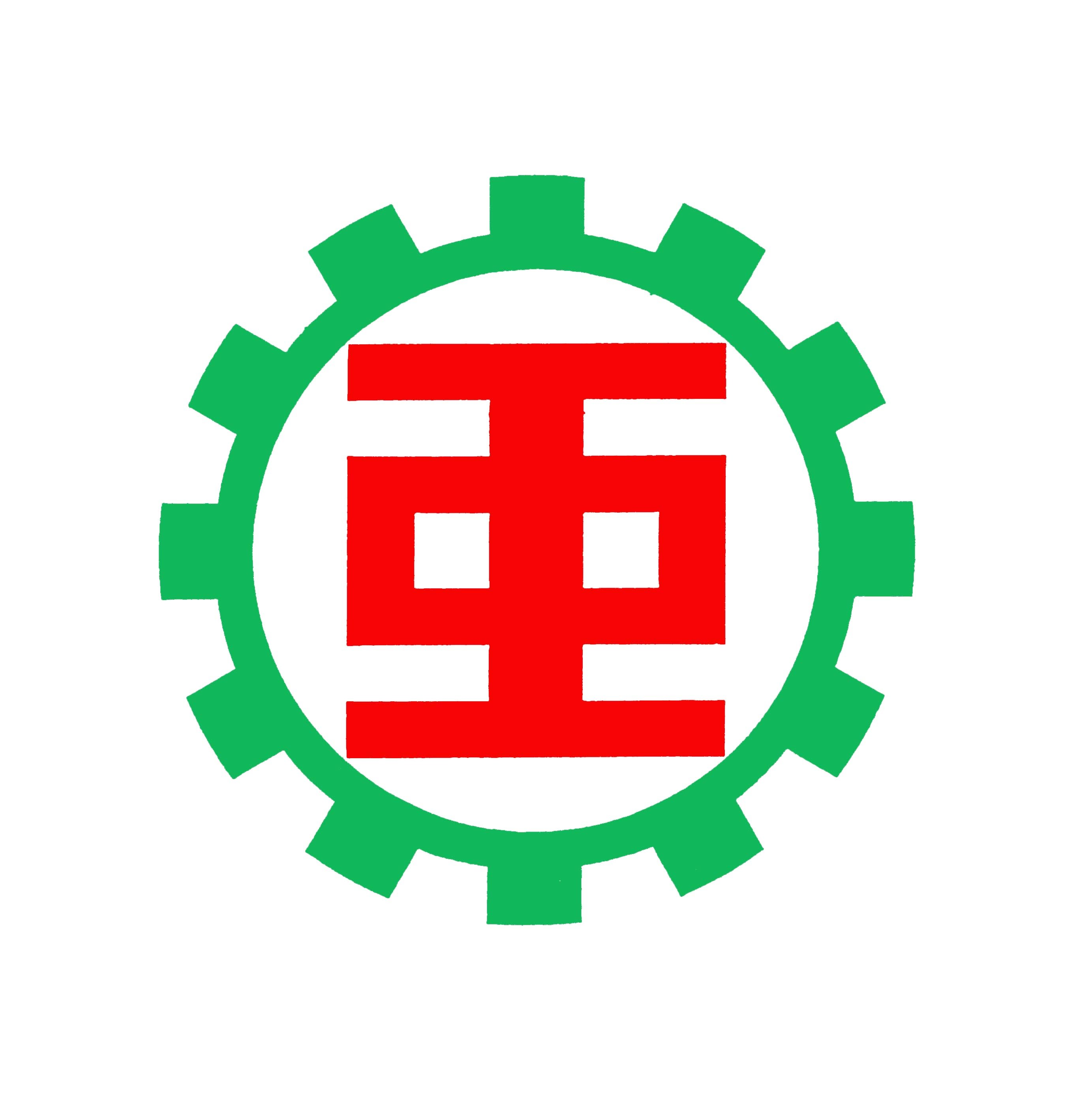

Location
- No.191, Gaogong Rd, South District, Taichung City

Information
- Type: Municipal vocational high school
- Motto: Chinese : 誠、樸、宏、毅
- Established: Taichung County Industrial School, 1938; 88 years ago
- School district: South District, Taichung, Taiwan
- Principal: Shangyu Huang (黃尚煜)
- Affiliation: Taichung City Government
- Campus area: 116,276 m^{2}

The Taichung Municipal Taichung Industrial High School (Chinese: 臺中市立臺中工業高級中等學校) is a vocational school in South District, Taichung, Taiwan, also one of the top vocational high school in Taiwan, near National Chung Hsing University, Daqing Station, THSR Taichung Station, National Library of Public Information.

== History ==
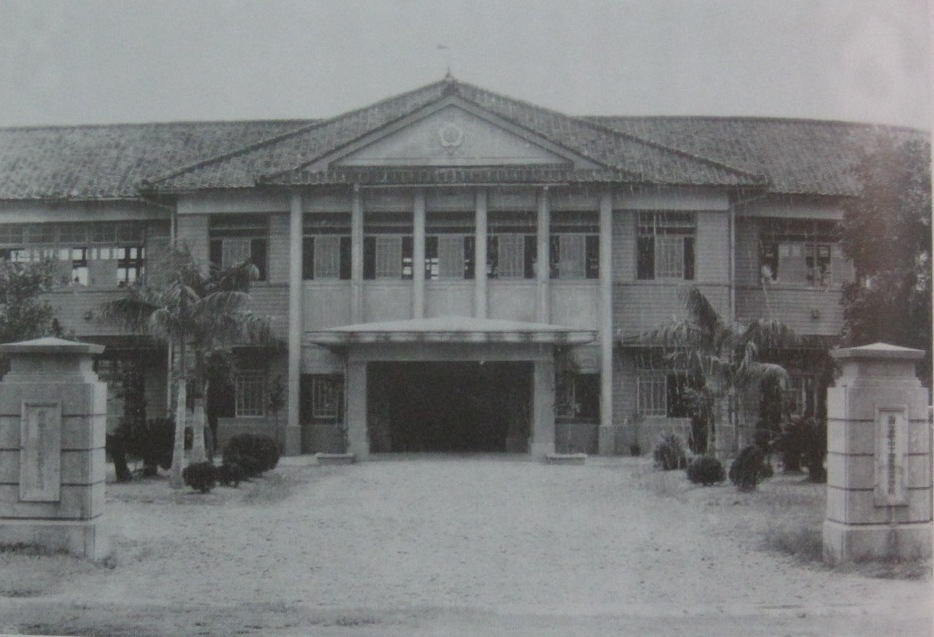
The school door in 1946

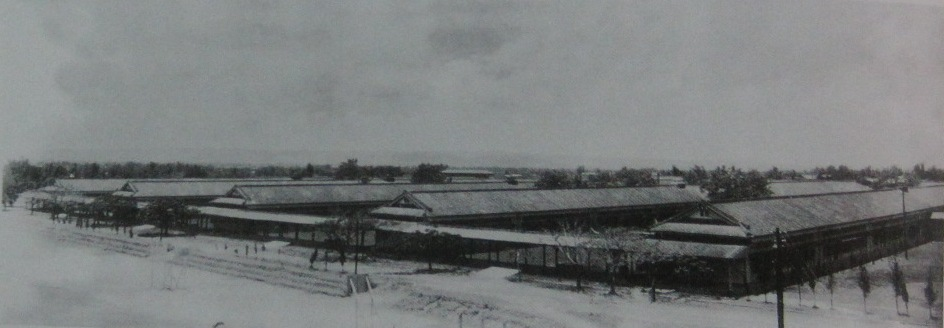
The school building in 1946

- Built in 1938, the name was Taichung County Taichung Industrial School
- In 1945, the name was changed to Taiwan Provincial Taichung Industrial School
- In August, 1951, the name was changed to Taiwan Provincial Taichung Industrial High School
- In 1953, It has been a demonstration school
- In 2000, the name was changed to National Taichung Industrial High School
- In 2017, the name was changed to Taichung Municipal Taichung Industrial High School

== Transportation ==
Buses in Taichung

- Ubus：G3、3、53、73、79
- Taichung Bus：33、35、82、101、102
- Chuan Hang Tourism：58、65
- Chung-Lu Bus：105
- CTbus : 125、37

Railway

- Taiwan Railway
  - Daqing Station
- Green Line
  - Daqing Station
