= Wu Quan =

Wu Quan or Wuquan may refer to:

- Ngô Quyền (897–944), Vietnamese prefect and general
- Go Seigen (1914–2014), or Wu Qingyuan, birth name Wu Quan, Chinese-born Japanese Go player
- Wuquan Mountain
- Wuquan railway station

== See also ==
- Nantun metro station, of which name of secondary station is Wenxin Wuquan W.
- Wucyuan Elementary School light rail station, a light rail station of Circular light rail, Kaohsiung, Taiwan
