= List of bus routes in Taichung =

The bus routes in Taichung includes city bus lines belonging to Transportation Bureau, Taichung City Government and highway bus lines belonging to Directorate General of Highways, MOTC. All of the routes are charged according to the mileages. Taichung City Bus is managed by Transportation Bureau, Taichung City Government, and operated by 16 companies.

== City Bus Line ==
Luchan East Station, Luchan West Station, Renyou East Station, Renyou North Station, Gancheng, and Geya Station are closed to Taichung Station. Numbers in red are the routes passing by Taichung Station (Taichung Railway Station) or surrounding Stations.

=== Operators ===
The 16 operators of Taichung City Bus are Taichung Bus (台中客運), Fengyuan Bus (豐原客運), Ubus (統聯客運), Renyou Bus (仁友客運), Chuan Hang Bus (全航客運), Geya Bus (巨業交通), Southeast Bus (東南客運), Kuo-Kuang Bus (國光客運), Green Transit (豐榮客運), Ho Hsin Bus (和欣客運), Central Taiwan Bus (中臺灣客運), Miaoli Bus (苗栗客運), Free Go Bus (建明客運), Sifang Bus (四方客運), Lishan Bus (梨山社區發展協會) and Jieshun Bus (捷順交通).

=== Lishan Bus ===
Route No.	Operating Route	other Remarks	Operator
1	Xinjiayang (新佳陽) - Huanshan (環山)	Tri-Mountain National Scenic Area	Lishan Bus

=== 1 - 49 ===
Route No.	Operating Route	other Remarks	Operator
1	Natural Way Six Arts Cultural Center (道禾六藝文化館) - Central Taiwan University of Science and Technology		Central Taiwan Bus
3	Dongshan Senior High School - THSR Taichung Station		Ubus
5	Taichung TRA station - Overseas Chinese University		Chuan Hang Bus
6	Taichung Station-Zhongyi Village (忠義里)/National Experimental High School at Central Taiwan Science Park		Taichung Bus
7	Taichung First Senior High School - Yongcheng Park (永成公園)		Southeast Bus
8	Natural Way Six Arts Cultural Center - Feng Chia University		Taichung Bus
9	National Library of Public Information - Qingshui (清水/中山高美路口)		Taichung Bus
11	Taichung Railway Station - National Taiwan Museum of Fine Arts - Calligraphy Greenway - National Museum of Natural Science-Chung Shan Hall - Taichung Park - Taichung Railway Station		Taichung Bus; Fengyuan Bus; Chuan Hang Bus
12	Ming-Der Senior High School-National Fengyuan Senior High School (Zhengqing Temple 鎮清宮)		Taichung Bus; Fengyuan Bus; Chuan Hang Bus
14	Luchuan East Station-Jiuzhuang (舊庄)		Taichung Bus
14	Luchuan East Station-Jiuzhuang-Nanqing Temple (南清宮)		Taichung Bus
14	Jiuzhuang-Nanqing Temple		Taichung Bus
14 Sub.	Gancheng Station-Shengang District Office (神岡區公所)		Taichung Bus
15	Luchuan East Station-Taichung Armed Forces General Hospital		Taichung Bus
17	Caohu-Dataizhong Community		Southeast Bus
18	Chaoma (朝馬) - Dazhi Park (大智公園)		Ubus
19	Jyun Fu Park (軍福公園) - Hanxi (旱溪) - National Taiwan Museum of Fine Arts		Renyou Bus
20	Gancheng Station-Taichung Tzu Chi Hospital (臺中慈濟醫院)-Tanzi Station (Rear) (潭子火車站後站)		Central Taiwan Bus
21	Natural Way Six Arts Cultural Center-Guicheng Community (貴城山莊)		Renyou Bus
21	Natural Way Six Arts Cultural Center-Guicheng Community - Mingde Bridge (明德橋)		Renyou Bus
21	Natural Way Six Arts Cultural Center-Dongshan Senior High School - Guicheng Community-Mingde Bridge		Renyou Bus
21	Natural Way Six Arts Cultural Center-Guicheng Community - Mingde Bridge - Zhongxingling (中興嶺)		Renyou Bus
23	Zhongqing Tongrong intersection-Dali Senior High School		Ubus
25	Chung-shin Elementary School (忠信國小) - Overseas Chinese University(Wensiu parking lot)		Central Taiwan Bus
26	Shin min High School - Ling Tung University		Taichung Bus
27	Taichung TRA station - Ling Tung University		Taichung Bus
28	Sizhangli Library (四張犁圖書館) - Pingding (坪頂)		Taichung Bus
29	Ling Tung University - First Square-Ling Tung University (Taichung Prison is the actual terminal stop)		Taichung Bus
29	First Square - Taichung Prison (29A)		Taichung Bus
29	Taichung Prison - Firat Square (29B)		Taichung Bus
30	Ling Tung University-Renyou East Station-Ling Tung University		Renyou Bus
32	Dapeng Community (大鵬新城) - Yuying Junior High School (育英國中)		Renyou Bus
33	Overseas Chinese University - THSR Taichung Station		Taichung Bus
35	Overseas Chinese University-South District Office (南區區公所)		Taichung Bus
37	Hengshan (橫山) - Taichung Station-THSR Station		Central Taiwan Bus
39	Lishin Elementary School (立新國小) - THSR Station		Nantou Bus
40	Renyou East Station - Zhongtai Community (中台新村)		Green Transit
41	National Library of Public Information - Tzu Ming High School (慈明高中/水井前)		Taichung Bus
45	Central Taiwan Science Park Bureau-Renyou East Station - Central Taiwan Science Park Bureau		Renyou Bus
48	Renyou East Station-Qiedongjiao (茄苳腳) - Ling Tung University		Green Transit
49	Tiger City - Anhe Junior High School - Taichung Industrial Zone		Taichung Bus
49	Anhe Junior High School - Taichung Industrial Zone		Taichung Bus

=== 50 - 99 ===
Route No.	Operating Route	other Remarks	Operator
50	Shin min High School - 921 Earthquake Museum of Taiwan		Ubus
51	Juguang Community (莒光新城) - Taichung Tun District Art Centre (屯區藝文中心)		Fengyuan Bus
52	NCHU-Zhongmin S. Rd.-Zhongmin Rd.-Jinhua N. Rd.-Jinhua Rd.-Taichung Railway Station-Jiancheng Rd.-NCHU		Renyou Bus
53	Taiyuan Station-Taiwan Provincial Consultative Council		Ubus
54	Xiagangwei (下港尾) - Wuri Depot (烏日停車場)		Taichung Bus
55	Fengyuan (豐原) - Taichung District Court		Fengyuan Bus
56	Gancheng Station (干城站) - Ling Tung University		Ubus
58	Daqing Activity Center (大慶活動中心) - Tanzi Shengli Park (潭子勝利運動公園) (Ganzhe Village Activity Center is the actual terminal stop)		Chuan Hang Bus
59	Jiushe Park (舊社公園) - Jiuzheng (舊正)		Ubus
60	Pingding-Dazhi Park (大智公園)		Taichung Bus
61	Xinguang Village (新光里) - Taichung Station-Daya (大雅)		Ubus
63	Fengyuan-Taichung Veterans General Hospital		Fengyuan Bus/Ubus
65	South District Office (南區區公所) - Tanyashen Bikeway (潭雅神綠園道)		Chuan Hang Bus
66	Taichung Tzu Chi Hospital - Dakeng Traffic Circle (大坑圓環) - Hengkeng Lane (橫坑巷) - Liankeng Lane (連坑巷) - Dakeng Traffic Circle - Taichung Tzu Chi Hospital		Taichung Bus
67	Taichung TRA station - Donghai Community (東海別墅)		Southeast Bus
68	Donghai Community - Central Taiwan University of Science and Technology		Geya Bus
69	Longtan Village (龍潭里) - Taichung Airport		Taichung Bus
70	Ling Tung University - Luchuan East Station - Ling Tung University		Taichung Bus
71	National Museum of Natural Science (NMONS) - Intercontinental Baseball Stadium		Taichung Bus
72	Ling Tung University-Taichung Tzu Chi Hospital (慈濟醫院)		Taichung Bus
73	Ubus Transfer Station-Juguang Community (莒光新城)		Ubus
75	Veterans Hospital Dormitory (榮總宿舍) - Yijiang Bridge		Ubus
77	Ubus Transfer Station - Taichung Tzu Chi Hospital (慈濟醫院)		Ubus
79	Ubus Transfer Station - Daqing Station		Ubus
81	Ubus Transfer Station - Taichung TRA station-Taiping		Ubus
82	Shuinan (水湳) - THSR Taichung Station		Taichung Bus
85	Xinguang Village (Taiping Dist.)(新光里). - Taiyuan Station (太原車站) - Yijiang Bridge. (一江橋)		Ubus
89	Ling Tung University - Dongmen Bridge (東門橋)		Green Transit
90	Fengyuan-Dongshi Industrial High School		Fengyuan Bus
90	Fengyuan-Dongshi Industrial High School - Heping District Public Health Center		Fengyuan Bus
91	Jiuzhuang (神岡舊庄) - Zhongxingling (中興嶺)		Fengyuan Bus
91	Taichung Airport - Jiuzhuang - Zhongxingling		Fengyuan Bus
92	Fengyuan - Daan Junior High School (大安國中)		Fengyuan Bus
93	THSR Taichung Station - Tongancuo (大甲區銅安厝)		Taichung Bus
95	Zhengying Rd. - Taiwan Blvd. Intersection (正英台灣大道口) - Waipu Senior Citizens Activity Center (外埔老人文康中心)		Central Taiwan Bus
95Sub.	Zhengying Rd. - Taiwan Blvd. Intersection - Waipu Senior Citizens Activity Center (Toucheng)		Central Taiwan Bus
97	National Yuanli Senior High School - Taichung Airport		Southeast Bus
98	Zhuangwei (神岡庄尾) - Puji Temple (普濟寺)		Southeast Bus
99	Juguang Community - Ling Tung University		Chang Hua Bus

=== 101 - 142 ===
Route No.	Operating Route	other Remarks	Operator
101	Dunhua Houzhuang 7th St. Intersection (敦化後庄七街口) - Changhua		Taichung Bus
102	Taichung Station-Shalu (沙鹿)		Taichung Bus
105	Sizhangli (四張犁) - Longjing (龍井)		Renyou Bus
107	Liming Community (黎明新村) - Jiuzheng		Taichung Bus
108	Gangwei (港尾) - Nan Kai University of Technology (南開科技大學)		Taichung Bus
111	Qingshui Station - Wuqi Sightseeing Fishing Port		Geya Bus
123	Taichung Tzu Chi Hopital-Wuqi Sightseeing Fishing Port (梧棲觀光漁市)		Renyou Bus
127	Intercontinental Baseball Stadium-Fong Le Sculpture park (豐樂雕塑公園)		Green Transit
128	Daya (大雅) - Qingshui (清水)		Taichung Bus
131	Beitun District Administration Building - Chaoyang University of Technology (朝陽科技大學)		Taichung Bus
132	Beitun District Administration Building - Chaoyang University of Technology		Taichung Bus
133	THSR Taichung Station - Chaoyang University of Technology		Taichung Bus
142	Fengnian Community - Luchuan East Station-Fengnian Community (豐年社區)		Taichung Bus

=== 151 - 199 ===
Route No.	Operating Route	other Remarks	Operator
151	New City Hall-Asia University-Chaoyang University		Central Taiwan Bus
151	New City Hall-Chaoyang University		Central Taiwan Bus
152	Taichung City Council-City Hall Fengyuan Branch		Central Taiwan Bus
153	THSR Taichung Station-New City Hall-Guguan		Fengyuan Bus
153副	New City Hall-Guguan		Fengyuan Bus
154	Taichung Girls Senior High School-Dajia District Office		Taichung Bus
155	THSR Taichung Station-Houli District Office-Lihpao Land		Central Taiwan Bus
155副	THSR Taichung Station-National Freeway 1 Tai'an Service Area-Lipao Land		Central Taiwan Bus
156	THSR Taichung Station-Taichung Airport		Taichung Bus
157	Fulfillment Amphitheatre (文心森林公園)-Waipu District Office		Taichung Bus
158	THSR Taichung Station-Chaoyang University of Technology		Chuan Hang Bus
159	THSR Taichung Station-Taichung Park		Ubus
160	THSR Taichung Station-Overseas Chinese University		Ho Hsin Bus
161	THSR Taichung Station-Central Taiwan Science Park		Ho Hsin Bus
162	Providence University-Chia Yang Senior High School (嘉陽高中)-Taichung Airport-Chia Yang Senior High School-Providence University		Central Taiwan Bus
163	Washington High School-Luchuan East Station-Washington High School		Taichung Bus
164	Ching Shuei Junior High School - Yangcuo Village		Geya Bus
165	Ching Shuei Junior High School - Jiuzhuang		Geya Bus
166	Taichung - Wuri - THSR Taichung Station - Dadu - Longjing - Shalu		Geya Bus
167	Dajia - Qingshui - Shalu - Overseas Chinese University		Geya Bus
170	Dajia Stadium (大甲體育場)-Wuqi (梧棲)		Fengyuan Bus
171	Dajia Stadium - Daan Port (大安港)		Fengyuan Bus
172	Dajia-Yongan (永安)-Fuzhu Village (福住里)		Fengyuan Bus
178	Qingshui (清水)-Gaomei Rd. (高美路)-Gaomei Wetlands (高美濕地)		Geya Bus
179	Qingshui-Sanmei Rd. (三美路)-Gaomei Wetlands		Geya Bus
180	Shalu-Dadu (大肚)-Changhua		Geya Bus
181	Dajia-Chuantoupu (船頭埔)-Yuanli (苑裡)		Miaoli Mus
182	Fengyuan (豐原)-Xinzhuang (新庄)-Qingshui		Fengyuan Bus
183	Fengyuan-Xinzhuang-Port of Taichung		Fengyuan Bus
185	Fengyuan-Dongshan (東山)-Qingshui		Fengyuan Bus
186	Fengyuan-Dongshan-Port of Taichung		Fengyuan Bus
199	Longjing District Office-Wenxiu Parking Lot (Overseas Chinese University)		Jasun Bus

=== 200 - 246 ===
Route No.	Operating Route	other Remarks	Operator
200	Taichung Girls' Senior High School-Wufeng District Farmers' Association		Taichung Bus
201	Asia University-Ming-Der Senior High School-Taichung Station-Shin min High School		Taichung Bus
202	Fengfu Park-Shude Rd. (樹德路)-Xintian (新田)-Fengyuan		Fengyuan Bus
203	Fengfu Park-Dongshan Rd. (東山路)-Xintian-Fengyuan		Fengyuan Bus
206	Fengyuan-Dongshi South Station (東勢南站)		Fengyuan Bus
206; Extended	Shigang Junior High School (石岡國中)-Donshi Industrial High School		Fengyuan Bus
207	Fengyuan-Guguan (谷關)		Fengyuan Bus
208	Fengyuan-Zhuolan (卓蘭)		Fengyuan Bus
209	Fengyuan-Dongshi Forest Garden (東勢林場)		Fengyuan Bus
210	Dajia (大甲)-Tucheng (土城)		Fengyuan Bus
211	Fengyuan-Tucheng-Dajia Stadium		Fengyuan Bus
212	Fengyuan-Shuimei (水美)-Dajia Stadium		Fengyuan Bus
213	Fengyuan- Xiahouli (下后里)-Dajia Stadium		Fengyuan Bus
214	Fengyuan- Liufen Rd. (六分路)-Dajia		Fengyuan Bus
215	Fengyuan-Lihpaoland (麗寶樂園)-Dajia Stadium		Fengyuan Bus
216	Dajia-Nanpu (南埔)		Fengyuan Bus
218	Fengyuan-Shengang District Office		Fengyuan Bus
219	Shigang Elementary School (石岡國小)-Longxing Village (龍興里)		Fengyuan Bus
219; Extended	Shigang Junior High School-Longxing Village		Fengyuan Bus
220	Fengyuan-Taichung Veterans General Hospital(台中榮總)		Fengyuan Bus
223	Fengyuan-Gonglaopingding (公老坪頂)		Fengyuan Bus
226	CTSP Houli (中科后里辦公室)-Taiping Village		Fengyuan Bus
227	Fengyuan-Dongyang Village (東陽里)		Fengyuan Bus
228	Fengyuan-Overseas Chinese University (僑光科技大學)		Fengyuan Bus
229	Fengyuan-Chaoma (朝馬)		Fengyuan Bus
232	Fengyuan-Dongshan (東山)		Fengyuan Bus
235	Fengyuan-Taichung City Council-Cultural Center-Fengyuan		Fengyuan Bus
236	Fengyuan-Shengang (神岡)-Shalu (沙鹿)		Fengyuan Bus
237	Fengyuan-Shengang-Shalu-Dadu Station (大肚火車站)		Fengyuan Bus
238	Fengyuan E. Station-Shengang-Shalu-Taichung Post Office (原BRT行控中心)		Fengyuan Bus
239	Fengyuan-Daya (大雅)-Qingshui (清水)-Wuqi (梧棲)		Fengyuan Bus
246	Taiyuan Station-Taichung Armed Forces General Hospital		Allday Bus

=== 250 - 291 ===
Route No.	Operating Route	other Remarks	Operator
250	Dongshi (東勢)-Zhongkengping (中坑坪)		Fengyuan Bus
251	Dongshi-Hengliou River (橫流溪)		Fengyuan Bus
252	Dongshi-Dasyueshan Forest Recreation Area (大雪山)		Fengyuan Bus
253	Dongshi-Shihlin Village (泰安區士林村)		Fengyuan Bus
258	Dongshi-Zhuolan		Fengyuan Bus
260	Dongshi-Shuiwei		Fengyuan Bus
261	Dongshi-Mingzheng Village		Fengyuan Bus
262	Dongshi-Pitou Village (埤頭里)		Fengyuan Bus
263	Dongshi-Kunshan (崑山)		Fengyuan Bus
264	Dongshi-Dongxing (東興)-Xinwu Village (新五里)		Fengyuan Bus
265	Dongshi-Danan (大南)-Xinwu Village		Fengyuan Bus
266	Dongshi-Guguan (谷關)		Fengyuan Bus
267	Dongshi-Shangguguan (上谷關)		Fengyuan Bus
269	Guguan-Basianshan Forest Recreation Area (八仙山)		Fengyuan Bus
270	Fengfu Park-Danan(大南)-Dongshi		Fengyuan Bus
271	Fengfu Park-Dongxing (東興)-Dongshi		Fengyuan Bus
272	Dongshi-Qiedongliao(茄苳寮)		Fengyuan Bus
273	Xinwu Village (新五里)-Qiedongliao		Fengyuan Bus
275	Dongshi-Zhonghe Village (中和里)		Fengyuan Bus
276	Fengfu Park-Xingzhong Community (興中山莊)-Dongshi		Fengyuan Bus
277	Fengfu Park-Fusheng Village (復盛里)-Dongshi		Fengyuan Bus
278	Dongshi-Shuijing (水井)		Fengyuan Bus
279	Xinshe (新社)-Shuijing		Fengyuan Bus
280	Taichung Second Senior High School-Taiping (太平)-Hsiuping University of Science and Technology		Fengyuan Bus
281	Taichung Station-Wuguang Village (五光里)-Xinan(溪南)-Wufeng Elementary School (霧峰國小)-Wufeng Agricultural and Industrial Vocational High School (霧峰農工)		Central Taiwan Bus
281Sub.	Gancheng Station-Wufeng Agricultural and Industrial Vocational High School		Central Taiwan Bus
282	Asia University Ando Museum-Liuguzhuang (六股庄)-Nanshi (南勢)-Dingtai (丁台)-Beiliu (北柳)-Wufeng Elementary School-Tonglin (桐林)		Central Taiwan Bus
283	Wufeng (Taiwan Provincial Consultative Council)- Jen-Ai Hospital - Dali (大里仁愛醫院)		Renyou Bus
284	Taichung Station-Hsiuping University of Science and Technology(修平科技大學)		Taichung Bus
285	New Jianguo Market-Taichung Station-Dali (大里)-Kanding (崁頂)		Southeast Bus
286	Taichung Second Senior High School-Taiping-Chelongpu (車籠埔)-Kanding (崁頂)		Fengyuan Bus
287	Taichung Armed Forces General Hospital-Tianyuanmile Temple (天圓彌勒院)		Fengyuan Bus
288	Taichung Second Senior High School-Taiping-Toubiankeng-Bianfudong-Maopu-Tianyuanmile Temple		Fengyuan Bus
289	Taichung Second Senior High School-Taiping-Dongping Community (東平社區)		Fengyuan Bus
290	Gancheng (Taichung Station)-Shalu-Tungs' Taichung MetroHarbor Hospital (Wuqi Branch)(童綜合醫院梧棲院區)		Taichung Bus
291	Shanduolv Community (山多綠社區) in Wufeng District-Environmental Protection Park		Central Taiwan Bus

=== 300 - 359 ===
After the City Government of Taichung called off the BRT Blue Line System on 8 July 2015, those routes which were prefixed with a "藍" character, which means blue, were regiven new route numbers. The numbers go over 320 and 350. According to the new policy, the routes between 300 and 308 run along the inner bus lane on Taiwan Boulevard, which was adapted from the former BRT Lane.

Route No.	Operating Route	other Remarks	Operator
300	Providence University-Taichung Station-Providence University		Ubus/Taichung Bus/Geya Bus
301	Providence University-Shin Min High School		Ubus
302	Taichung Airport-Taichung Park		Central Taiwan Bus
303	Taichung City Seaport Art Center (港區藝術中心)-Shalu-Shin Min High School		Ubus
304	Taichung City Seaport Art Center-Shalu-Shin Min High School		Taichung Bus
305	Dajia-Luliao(鹿寮)-Taichung Station-Luliao-Dajia		Geya Bus
306	Qingshui-Wuqi-Taichung Station-Wuqi-Qingshui		Geya Bus
307	Wuqi Sightseeing Fishing Port (梧棲觀光漁市)-Dazhi Rd. Wubei Rd. Intersection(大智梧北路口)-Shin min High School		Taichung Bus
308	Related Industry Park-Taichung Harbour-Shin Min High School		Ubus
309	Gaomei Wetland-Taichung Station-Gaomei Wetland		Ubus/Taichung Bus/Geya Bus
310	Taichung Harbour-Taichung Station-Taichung Harbour		Ubus/Taichung Bus/Geya Bus
323	Taichung Station-Donghai Community-Taichung Motor Vehicles Office (臺中區監理所)		Taichung Bus
324	Shin Min High School-Taichung Metropolitan Park (臺中都會公園)		Taichung Bus
325	Taichung Station-Dadu Station		Taichung Bus
326	Providence University-Shin Min High School		Ubus
351	Ubus Transfer Station-Taichung Industrial Zone		Ubus
352	Pingding (坪頂)-Longjing-Dadu		Chuan Hang Bus
353	Tianmu Yingcheng Community(天母櫻城)-Shalu		Geya Bus
354	Tunghai University-Overseas Chinese University		Sifang Bus (四方客運)
356	Taichung Veterans General Hospital-Daqing Station		Jasun Bus (捷順交通)
357	Taichung Veterans General Hospital-Ling Tung University		Jasun Bus
358	Feng Chia University-Ling Tung Senior High School(嶺東高中)		Renyou Bus
359	Donghai Community(東海別墅)-Fulfillment Amphitheatre(文心森林公園)		Jasun Bus

=== 500 - 989 ===
Route No.	Operating Route	other Remarks	Operator
500	Zhongyi Village(忠義里)-Taichung Station		Taichung Bus; Ubus
616	Wuqi-Dajia		Southeast Bus
617	Wuqi-THSR Taichung Station		Zhonglu Bus
655	Gaomei Wetland-Xinwuri Station (新烏日車站)-Ling Tung University		Renyou Bus
658	Daangang(大安港)-Dajia-National Taichung Theater		Central Taiwan Bus
659	Youshi Industrial Zone(幼獅工業區)-Dajia-Taichung Veteran Hospital		Taichung Bus
668	Rinan Station(日南)-Dajia Station-Dajia District Office		Southeast Bus
677	Shalu-Zhongyang Rd.(中央路)-Longjin(龍津)-Qietou(茄投)-Zhukengkou(竹坑口)-Longjing Station(龍井車站)-Shalu		Geya Bus
688	Qingshui Station-Taichung City Seaport Art Center-Gaomei Wetland		Geya Bus
699	Nanpu (南埔)-Dajia Station-Dajia-Stadion		Geya Bus
700	Ming Der Senior High School-National Fengyuan Senior High School		Taichung Bus; Chuan Hang Bus
811	Fengyuan Station-Dajia Stadion		Jasun Bus
821	Dongshi-Heping Health Center		Fengyuan Bus
850	Taichung Station-Shuinan-Dongshi-Heping-Guguan		Fengyuan Bus
900	Guangming Junior High School-National Fengyuan Senior High School		Fengyuan Bus
901	Fengyuan-Shin min High School-Taichung Station-Ming-Der Senior High School		Taichung Bus
956	Fengyuan Station-Kuang Hwa Senior Industrial Vocatinoal High School (光華高工)		Jasun Bus
989	Wengzi(翁子)-Zunqian Ren'ai Park(圳前仁愛公園)		Fengyuan Bus

== Highway and Freeway Bus Line ==
From 1 June 2009, freeway bus lines and highway bus lines use four digit numbers, and they are all managed by Directorate General of Highways, MOTC. The “Original No.” in the below table indicates the No. before then.

Route No. / Original No.	Operating Route	Operator	Remark
1617	Dongshi-Fengyuan-Freeway No.1-Taipei	Ubus	
1619	Taichung-Taiwan Blvd.-Freeway No.1-Taipei	Ubus	
1620	Taichung-Zhongqing Rd.-Freeway No.1-Taipei	Ubus	
1621	Taichung-Chenggongling-Freeway No.1-Kaohsiung	Ubus	
1623 / 11	Taichung-Freeway No.1-Freeway No.2-Taiwan Taoyuan International Airport	Ubus	
1625	Taichung-Freeway No.1-Tainan	Ubus	
1628	Taipei-Freeway No.1-Ubus Zhonggang Transfer Station-Freeway No.1-Ouwang	Ubus	
1629	Taipei-Freeway No.1-Ubus Zhonggang Transfer Station-Freeway No.1-Lingziliao	Ubus	
1630	Taipei-Freeway No.1-Ubus Zhonggang Transfer Station-Freeway No.1-Xigang	Ubus	
1631	Taipei-Freeway No.1-Ubus Zhonggang Transfer Station-Freeway No.1-Yuanlin-Ershui-Zhushan	Ubus	
1632	Taipei-Freeway No.1-Ubus Zhonggang Transfer Station-Expressway No.74-Freeway No.3-Caotun-Zhushan	Ubus	
1633	Taipei-Freeway No.1-Ubus Zhonggang Transfer Station-Freeway No.1-Huwei-Yuanzhang-Beigang-Santiaolun	Ubus	
1635	Taipei-Freeway No.1-Ubus Zhonggang Transfer Station-Freeway No.1-Huwei-Dongshi-Taixi-Sihu-Santiaolun	Ubus	
1636	Taipei-Freeway No.1-Ubus Zhonggang Transfer Station-Freeway No.1-Xiluo-Lunbei-Mailiao-Taixi-Sihu-Santiaolun	Ubus	
1637	Taipei-Freeway No.1-Ubus Zhonggang Transfer Station-Freeway No.1-Xiluo-Lunbei-Mailiao-Taixi-Santiaolun	Ubus	
1638	Taipei-Freeway No.1-Ubus Zhonggang Transfer Station-Freeway No.1-Taibao-Puzi-Dongshi	Ubus	
1639	Taipei-Freeway No.1-Ubus Zhonggang Transfer Station-Freeway No.1-Taibao-Puzi-Budai	Ubus	
1652	Taipei-Freeway No.1-Ubus Zhonggang Transfer Station-Freeway No.1-Changhua-Lugang-Fangyuan	Ubus	
1656	Banqiao-Freeway No.3-Freeway No.1-Ubus Zhonggang Transfer Station-Freeway No.1-Freeway No.3-Pingtung	Ubus	
1657	THSR Taichung Station-Freeway No.3-Caotun-Nantou	Ubus	
1805	Taichung-Freeway No.1-Freeway No.3-Freeway No.1-Keelung	Kuo-Kuang Motor Transport	
1826	Taichung-Zhongqing Rd.-Freeway No.1-Taipei	Kuo-Kuang Motor Transport	
1827	Taichung-Taiwan Blvd.--Freeway No.1-Taipei	Kuo-Kuang Motor Transport	
1831	Taipei-Freeway No.1-Chaoma Transfer Station-Expressway No.74-Fenyuan-Caotun-Nantou	Kuo-Kuang Motor Transport	
1832	Taipei-Freeway No.1-Chaoma Transfer Station-Expressway No.74-Fenyuan-Caotun-Puli	Kuo-Kuang Motor Transport	
1851	Taichung-Freeway No.1-Freeway No.3-Banqiao	Kuo-Kuang Motor Transport	
1852	Taichung-Freeway No.3-Banqiao	Kuo-Kuang Motor Transport	
1860	Taichung-Freeway No.1-Freeway No.2-Taiwan Taoyuan International Airport	Kuo-Kuang Motor Transport	
1861	Taichung-Freeway No.1-Taoyuan	Kuo-Kuang Motor Transport	
1863	Taichung-Freeway No.1-Zhongli	Kuo-Kuang Motor Transport	
1866	Taichung-Freeway No.1-Hsinchu	Kuo-Kuang Motor Transport	
1870	Taichung-Freeway No.1-Chiayi	Kuo-Kuang Motor Transport	
1871	Taichung-Freeway No.1-Tainan	Kuo-Kuang Motor Transport	
1872	Taichung-Freeway No.1-Kaohsiung	Kuo-Kuang Motor Transport	
1873	Taichung-Freeway No.1-Freeway No.3-Pingtung	Kuo-Kuang Motor Transport	
5503 / 52	Taichung-Freeway No.1-Freeway No.2-Taiwan Taoyuan International Airport	Free Go Bus	
5666	Houli Junior High School-Sangui	Xinzhu Bus	
5808	Dajia-Yuanli-Tongxiao-Houlong	Miaoli Bus	
5814	Dajia-Yuanli-Tongxiao-Tongluo-Miaoli	Miaoli Bus	
6187	Taichung-Zhongtou Highway-Caotun-Freeway No.3-Chiayi	Taichung Bus	
6188	Taichung-Freeway No.3-Zhushan	Taichung Bus	
6235	Renyeou North Station-Formosan Aboriginal Cultural Village-Sun Moon Lake	Renyeou Bus	
6268 / 168	Taichung-Puli	Chuan Hang Bus	
6322	Taichung-Nangang-Shuili	All Da Bus	
6333	Taichung-Zhongxing New Village-Shuili	All Da Bus	
6354	Dajia-Yuanli-Tongxiao	Geya Bus	
6506	Fengyuan-Dongshi-Tianleng-Puli-Wushe-Lishan	Fengyuan Bus	
6508	Lishan-Wuling Farm	Fengyuan Bus	
6606	Fengyuan-Houli-Sanyi-Freeway No.1-Taipei	Fengyuan Bus	
6670	Taichung-THSR Taichung Station-Caotun-Puli-Yuchi-Formosan Aboriginal Cultural Village-Sun Moon Lake	Nantou Bus	
6735	Taichung-Changhua-Yuanlin-Ershui	Yuanlin Bus	
6736	Taichung-Changhua-Xihu-Caohu-Erlin	Yuanlin Bus	
6737	Taichung-Changhua-Xihu-Caohu-Erlin-Dacheng-Xigang	Yuanlin Bus	
6738	Taichung-Changhua-Xihu-Caohu-Erlin-Lushang-Fangyuan-Wanggong	Yuanlin Bus	
6870	Taichung-Nantou-Lugu-Xitou	Chang Hua Bus / Yuanlin Bus	
6871 / 702	Taichung-Sanlin River	Taichung Bus / Yuanlin Bus / SunLinXi Company	
6882 / 888	Taichung-Provincial Highway 1-Xiluo	Yuanlin Bus	
6883	Taichung-THSR Taichung Station-Xitou	Chang Hua Bus / Yuanlin Bus / Nantou Bus	
6899 / 999	Taichung-Puli	Taichung Bus / Nantou Bus	
6933 / 123	Taichung-Changhua-Lugang	Chang Hua Bus	
6935 / 103	Taichung-Changhua-Shuiwei	Chang Hua Bus	
6936	THSR Taichung Station-Changhua-Lugang	Chang Hua Bus	
6937	Daqing Station-THSR Taichung Station-Yuanlin-Tianwei	Chang Hua Bus	
7504	Taichung-Freeway No.1-Freeway No.2-Freeway No.3-Banqiao	Ho Hsin Bus	
7506	Liming Community-Freeway No.1-Chiayi	Ho Hsin Bus	
7511	Taichung Harbor-Freeway No.1-Taipei	Ho Hsin Bus	
9010	Taichung-Freeway No.1-Hsinchu	Taichung Bus	
9012	Taichung-Freeway No.3-Freeway No.1-Taipei	Taichung Bus / CitiAir Bus	
9015	Taichung-Freeway No.1-Huwei-Baozhong-Beigang	Taichung Bus	
9016	Taichung-Freeway No.1-Xiluo-Mailiao-Sihu	Taichung Bus	
9018	Taichung-Freeway No.1-Lugang	Ho Hsin Bus	
9120 / 701	Taichung-Caotun-Zhushan	Taichung Bus / Chang Hua Bus / Yuanlin Bus / Taisi Bus	

== See also ==
- Transportation in Taichung
- Taichung City Bus
- List of highway bus transit routes in Taiwan (Chinese)
- List of bus routes in Taipei
- List of bus routes in Tainan (Chinese)
- List of bus routes in Kaohsiung (Chinese)
- List of bus routes in Taoyuan (Chinese)
