= Chung Shan Medical University =

Medical university in Taichung City, Taiwan

Coordinates: 24°7′18″N 120°39′5″E

- 中山醫學大學
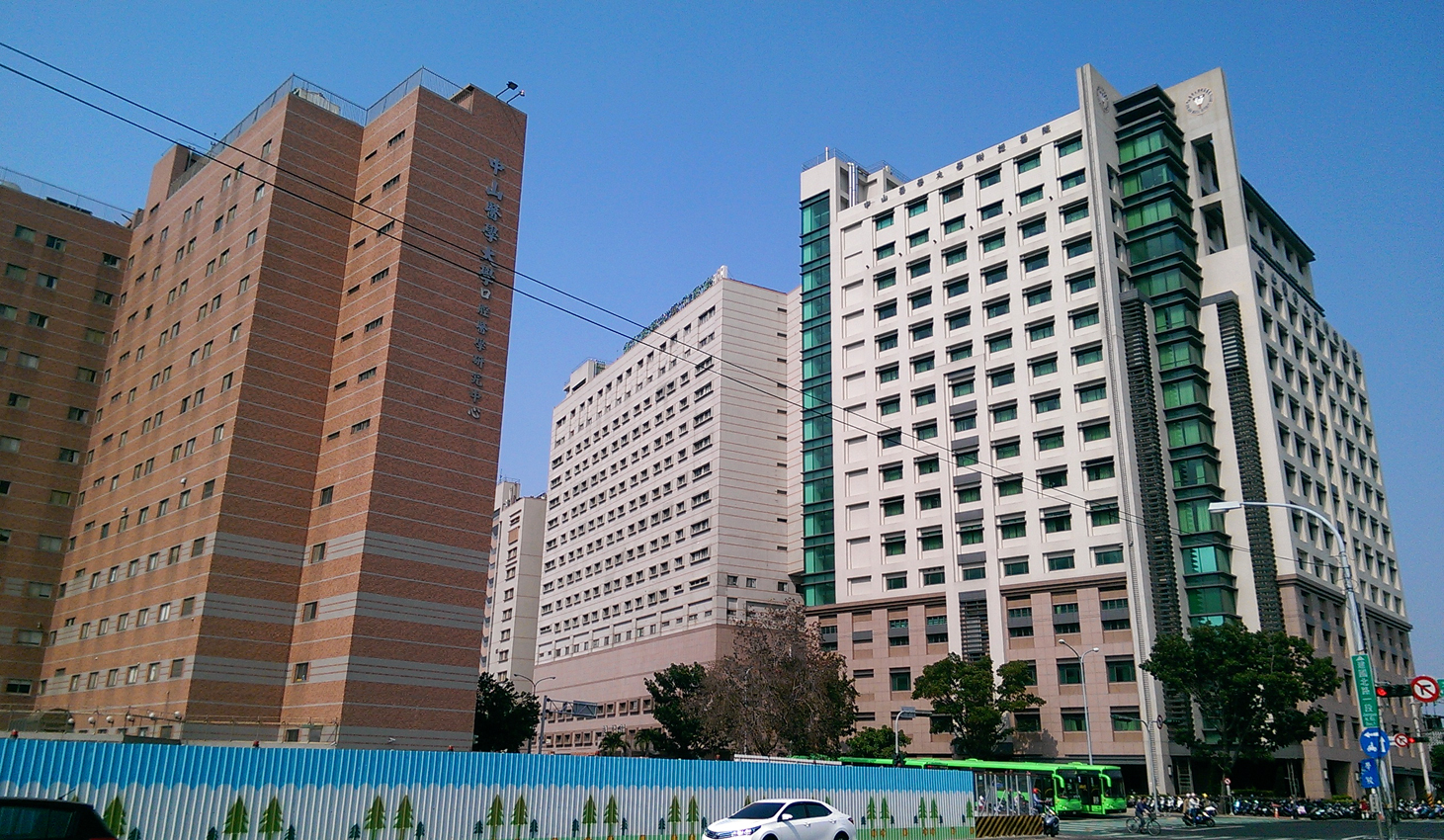
- Motto: 誠愛精勤(Pe̍h-ōe-jī: Sêng-ài Cheng-khîn)
- Motto in English: Honesty, Love, Excellence, Diligence
- Type: Private
- Established: Founded: 1960
- President: Chien-Ning Huang (黃建寧)
- Undergraduates: 7,049
- Postgraduates: 527
- Location: Taichung, Taiwan
- Campus: 9.2 acres (3.7 ha); Urban
- Website: csmu.edu.tw

Chung Shan Medical University
- Traditional Chinese: 中山醫學大學
Transcriptions
Standard Mandarin
- Hanyu Pinyin: Zhōngshān Yīxué Dàxué
Southern Min
- Hokkien POJ: Tiong-san I-ha̍k Tāi-ha̍k

Chung Shan Medical University (CSMU; Chinese: 中山醫學大學; pinyin: Zhōngshān Yīxué Dàxué) is a private medical school in South District, Taichung, Taiwan.

CSMU offers a wide range of undergraduate and graduate programs in the fields of medicine, dentistry, nursing, and health sciences. It houses a teaching hospital, Chung Shan Medical University Hospital.

CSMU has established partnerships with more than 60 universities and institutions worldwide, including the United States, Europe, Japan, and China. The university has also established a dual-degree program with the University of Missouri-Kansas City School of Dentistry.

== History ==
The university was established as Chung Shan Dentistry Specialized School (Chinese: 中山牙醫專科學校; Pe̍h-ōe-jī: Tiong-san Gê-i Choan-kho Ha̍k-hāu) in 1960, by Dr. Chou Ju-chuan (周汝川; Pe̍h-ōe-jī: Chiu Lú-chhoan), a Taiwanese dentist. At first it only provided four year dentistry education, and enrolled only 112 students. In 1962 it changed its name into Chung Shan Medical Specialized School (Chinese: 中山醫學專科學校), and provided medical education from then. In 1977, it was upgraded to Chung Shan Medical College (Chinese: 中山醫學院; Pe̍h-ōe-jī: Tiong-san I-ha̍k-īⁿ), and in August 2001 it was certified by the Ministry of Education as a normalized university named Chung Shan Medical University.

== Faculties ==
- College of Health Care and Management
- College of Medical Science and Technology
- College of Medicine
- College of Humanities and Social Science
- College of Oral Medicine

== Student life ==
There are 76 student clubs divided into six types: autonomy, learned, service, amity, artistry and sports. The university arranges instructors and offers subsidies to the clubs.

== Notable alumni ==
- Chen Chi-mai, mayor of Kaohsiung
- Chuan Wen-sheng, member of Legislative Yuan
- Ker Chien-ming, member of Legislative Yuan
- Susan Shur-Fen Gau, psychiatrist

== Transportation ==
The university is accessible within walking distance North East of Daqing Station of the Taiwan Railway and Taichung MRT.

== See also ==
- List of universities in Taiwan
