= National Library of Public Information =

Public library in South, Taichung, Taiwan

- 國立公共資訊圖書館
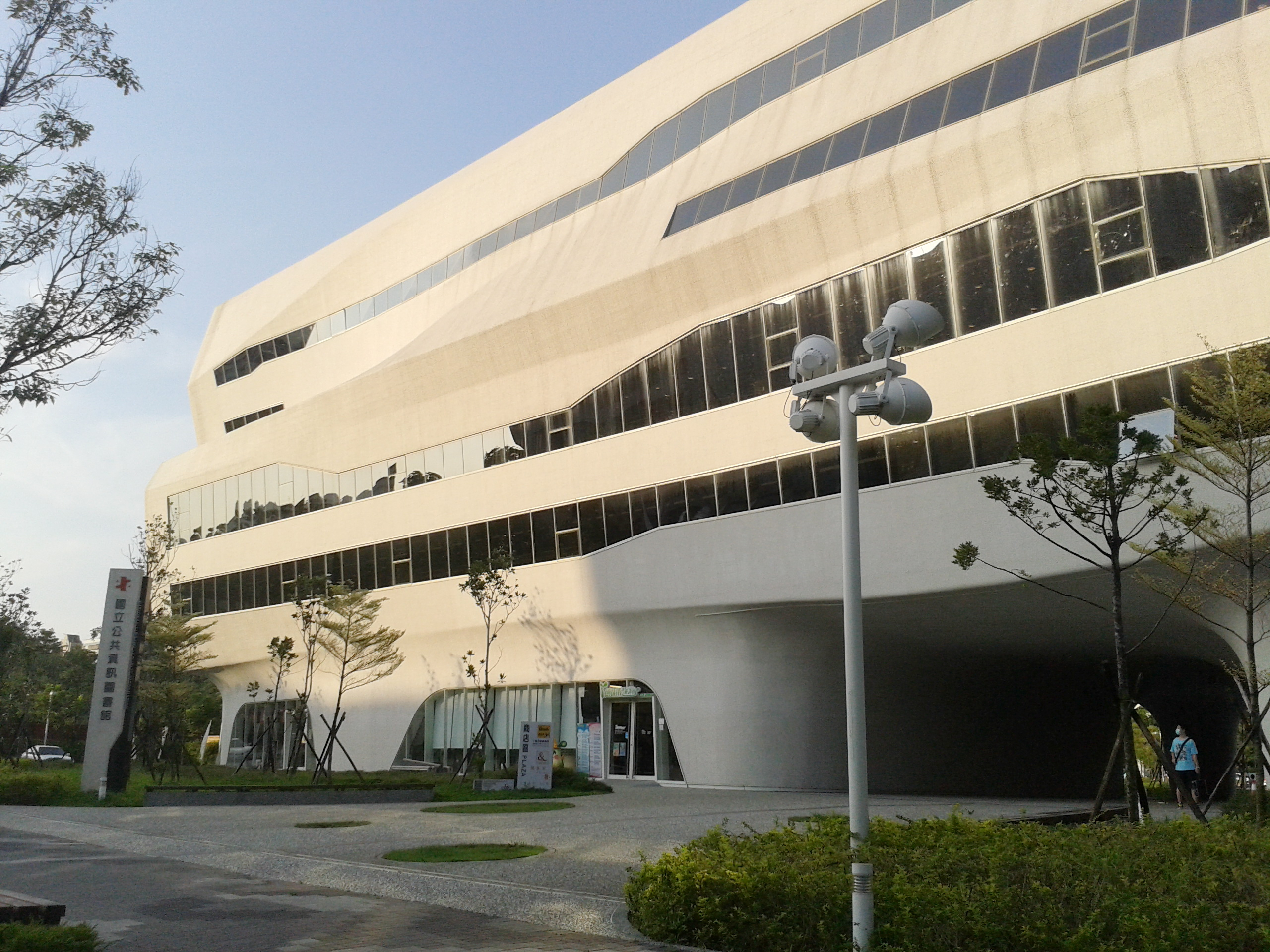
- 24°07′37.5″N 120°40′13.8″E
- Location: South, Taichung, Taiwan
- Type: public library
- Established: 1923

Other information
- Director: Liu Zhong-cheng
- Website: Official website

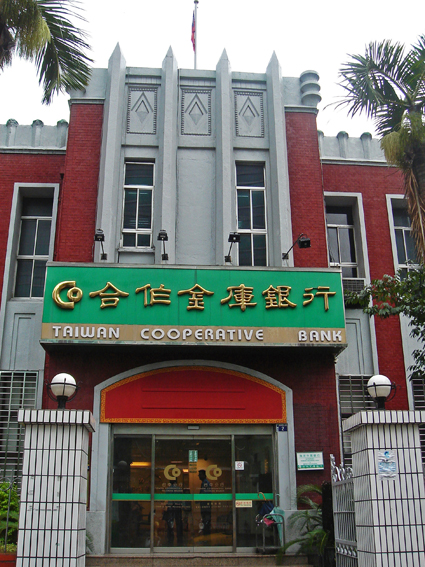
Former National Taichung Library

The National Library of Public Information (traditional Chinese: 國立公共資訊圖書館; simplified Chinese: 国立公共资讯图书馆; pinyin: Guólì Gōnggòng Zīxùn Túshūguǎn) is a public library in South District, Taichung, Taiwan.

== History ==
The library was established in 1923 as Taichu Prefectural Library. After the handover of Taiwan from Japan to the Republic of China in 1945 and Taiwan became the province of the republic, the library was named Taiwan Provincial Taichung Library from March 1946 until June 1999. In July 1999, it was renamed to National Taichung Library and it came under the jurisdiction of Council for Cultural Affairs. In January 2013, it was renamed National Library of Public Information.

== Architecture ==
The current building of the library consists of five stories above ground and two stories underground with a total floor area of 41,797 m^{2}.

== Branches ==
The library has three branches, which are the Liming Branch, Jing Wu Branch and Zhongxing Branch.

== Transportation ==
The library is accessible within walking distance south west from Taichung Station of Taiwan Railway.

== Directors ==
=== National Library of Public Information ===
- Liu Zhong-cheng (September 2016 -)
- Lu Chun-jiao (January 2013 - August 2016)

=== National Taichung Library ===
- Lu Chun-jiao (January 2010 - December 2012)
- Su Zhong (July 2008 - January 2010)
- Yang Xuan-qin (March 2007 - July 2008)
- Hong Qing-feng (January 2007 - March 2007)
- Xue Mao-song (January 2003 - January 2007)
- Cheng Liang-xiong (July 1999 - January 2003)

=== Taiwan Provincial Taichung Library ===
- Cheng Liang-xiong (November 1991 - June 1999)
- Chen Zu-rong (April 1987 - November 1991)

== See also ==
- Taichung
