= Wuquan Mountain =

Mountain in Gansu, China

Coordinates: 36.0350°N 103.8217°E

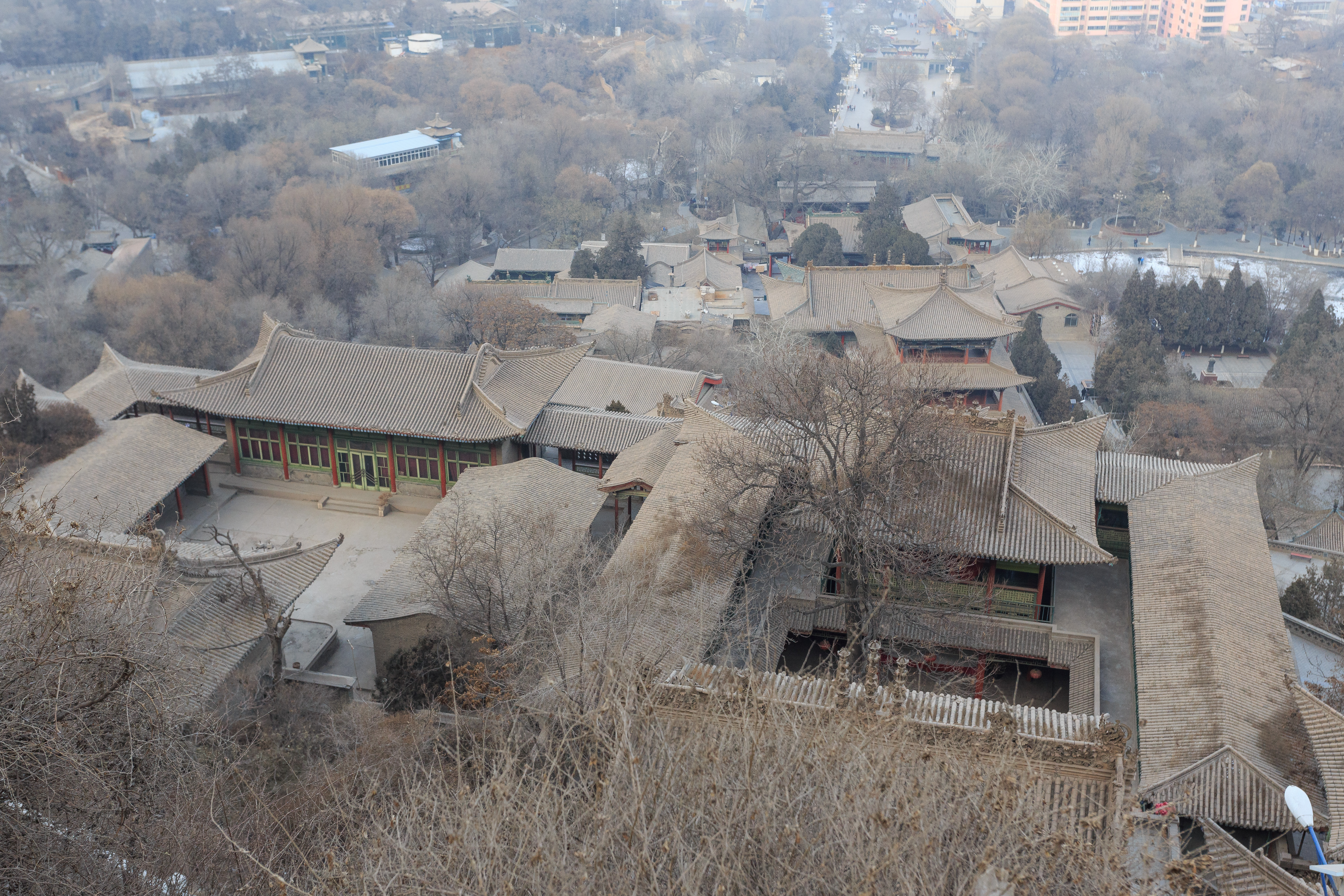
Wuquan Mountain

Wuquan Mountain (Chinese: 五泉山) is a mountain in southern Lanzhou in Gansu, China. It lies to the north of Gaolan Mountain (皋兰山). According to legend, the famous Western Han general Huo Qubing once led his forces here. They were very thirsty but could not find any water, so Huo slammed his horsewhip into the ground five times, and five springs appeared. This is the origin of the name Wuquan Mountain (literally Five Springs Mountain).

There are many ancient architectural sites on the mountain, including Butterfly Pavilion, Jingang Hall, Main Hall, Wanyuan Court, Wenchang Palace, Dizang Temple, and Thousand Buddha Temple.

== See also ==
- Five Springs Park
