= Taichung City Bus =

Bus network in the city of Taichung, Taiwan

Taichung City Bus 臺中市公車
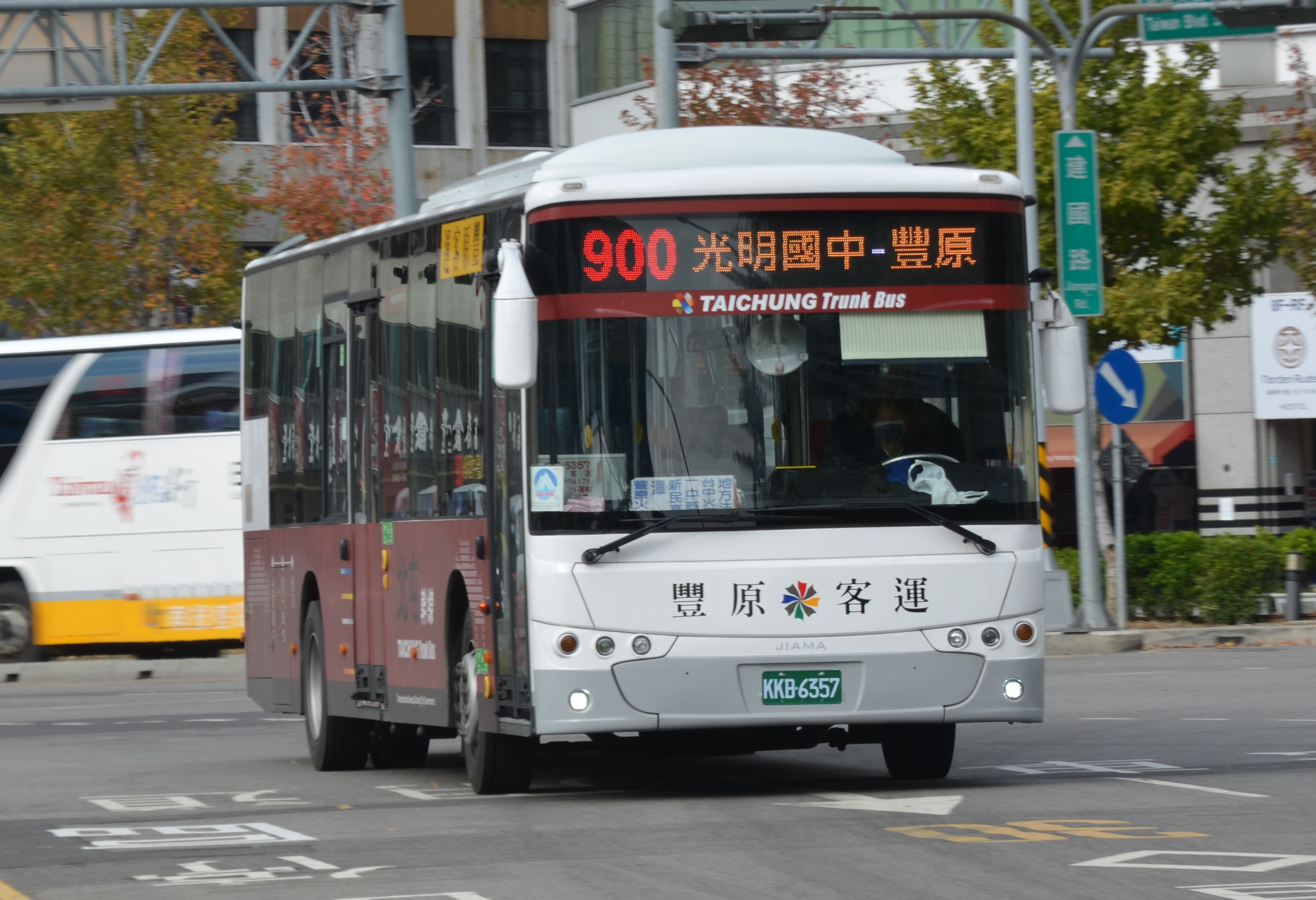
- Route 900 Beitun Trunk Bus Route, a high capacity bus route in Taichung
- Locale: Taichung City, Taiwan overleap: Caotun, Nantou County, Taiwan; Changhua, Changhua County, Taiwan; Ren'ai, Nantou County, Taiwan; Yuanli, Miaoli County, Taiwan; Sanyi, Miaoli County, Taiwan; Zhuolan, Miaoli County, Taiwan; Taian, Miaoli County, Taiwan

Taichung City Bus (Chinese: 臺中市市區公車; pinyin: Táizhōng Shì Shìqūgōngchē or so called Chinese: 臺中市公車; pinyin: Táizhōng Shì Gōngchē) is managed by the Transportation Bureau, Taichung City Government in Taichung City, Taiwan. This includes bus routes 1–989 which are operated by different bus companies. There're currently 275 bus routes, covering every districts. The main part of the network provides bus service in downtown area, some other routes connect different districts, and the others serve residents in rural or remote area.

== Fares ==
The fares are calculated by mileage per ride for cash. The basic fare is NT$20 for 10 km, and the extended fare is NT$2.431*(1+5% tax included) per km and round to the nearest integer. Paid by cash is from NT$20 while paid by card is from NT$15. Pay by card will have promotion on maximum fare to only NT$60 regardless on distance.

There are also Taichung TPASS or Central Taiwan TPASS (within Taichung City, Changhua County, Nantou County, and Miaoli County) which allow unlimited ride for all public transport within 30 days.

From 1 June 2011 to 30 June 2015, taking buses whose route numbers are under 300 with any of four sorts of electronic tickets (including EasyCard (悠遊卡)and I Pass (一卡通), could benefit from a free ride below 8 kilometers. From July 1, 2015, the same benefit extended from 8 km to 10 km, and the range of route numbers are no longer under 300. On Jan. 1, 2021, the double-ten city bus commuting offer “a free ride for less than 10 km + NT$10 at most for a ride above 10 km”. This special offer is provided to those who are registered citizens of Taichung City and their foreign spouses and students studying at schools below the university level in Taichung, regardless of their citizenship.

Benefit for students whom study below university grade in Taichung will become unavailable when they reach the expected date of leaving school.

Eligible residents and students will need apply for Citizen Exclusive Ride Code.

Currently there are some routes are pre booking which is free of charge such as Yellow taxi routes.

== Operators ==
List of Taichung City Bus providers
Name	Translated name	Number of routes running (May 2017 data)	Total running mileage in kilometer (May 2017 data)	Number of vehicles in service (May 2017 data)	Date established	Date joining Taichung City Bus network	Date leaving Taichung City Bus network
臺中汽車客運股份有限公司 台中客運	Taichung Bus Company, Ltd. Taichung Bus	64	1,454.50	407	1 January 1958	18 February 1958	
統聯汽車客運股份有限公司 統聯客運	United Highway Bus Company Limited; Ubus	25	489.33	300	6 September 1989	1 August 2002	
巨業交通股份有限公司 巨業交通	Geya Bus Transportation; Geya Bus	26	582.32	65	7 March 1974	1 March 2004	
全航汽車客運股份有限公司 全航客運	Chuan Hang Bus Company Limited; Chuan Hang Bus	9	174.00	59	1998	20 March 2004	
豐原汽車客運股份有限公司 豐原客運	Fengyuan Bus Transportation Co., Ltd. Fengyuan Bus	88	1958.10	229	22 October 1945	1 January 2010	
和欣汽車客運股份有限公司 和欣客運	HO-HSIN BUS TRAFFIC CO., LTD. Ho Hsin Bus	2	30.60	16	15 December 1999	1 January 2011	29 February 2012
和欣汽車客運股份有限公司 和欣客運	HO-HSIN BUS TRAFFIC CO., LTD. Ho Hsin Bus	2	30.60	16	15 December 1999	1 March 2013	
東南汽車客運股份有限公司 東南客運	Southeast Bus Company Limited; Southeast Bus	6	123.70	42	18 June 2002	1 November 2011	
豐榮汽車客運股份有限公司 豐榮客運	Green Transit Co., Ltd. Green Transit	4	65.82	25	15 August 1968	1 October 2012	
苗栗汽車客運股份有限公司 苗栗客運	MiaoLi Transportation Co., Ltd. Miaoli Bus	3	50.60	4	1935	10 December 2012	
中台灣客運股份有限公司 中台灣客運	Central Taiwan Bus Company Limited; Central Taiwan Bus/CTbus	20	481.08	101	24 September 2012	27 December 2012	
中鹿汽車客運股份有限公司 中鹿客運	Zhonglu Bus	3	124.40	19	15 December 1999	1 October 2016	
總達客運股份有限公司 總達客運	Allday Bus	1	8.00	5	1998	7 March 2017	
國光汽車客運股份有限公司 國光客運	Kuo-Kuang Motor Transportation Company Ltd. Kingbus	2	40.30	10	15 June 2001	26 May 2017	
梨山社區發展協會	Lishan Community Development Association					Dec 2021	
雙崎社區發展協會	Shuangqi Community Development Association					April 2025	
建明汽車客運股份有限公司	Free Go Bus	5	0		Nov 1992	11 Nov 2018	
睿奕交通股份有限公司	Ruiyi Transportation Co., Ltd	13	0	20	9 February 2023	17 October 2023	
怡美車隊	Yimei Taxi				September 1963	1 April 2017	
台灣大車隊	Taiwan Taxi				2001	1 January 2021	

== Former operators ==
List of Taichung City Bus providers
Name	Translated name	Number of routes running (May 2017 data)	Total running mileage in kilometer (May 2017 data)	Number of vehicles in service (May 2017 data)	Date established	Date joining Taichung City Bus network	Date leaving Taichung City Bus network
南投汽車客運股份有限公司 南投客運	NANTOU BUS TRANSPORTATION CO., LTD. Nantou Bus	1	14.60	2	1951	1 September 2014	30 October 2023
臺中快捷巴士股份有限公司 臺中快捷巴士	Taichung Rapid Transit Corporation Limited; Taichung Rapid Transit	0	0	0	1 October 2012	16 October 2015	30 June 2016
彰化汽車客運股份有限公司 彰化客運	Chang Hua Bus Company Limited; Chang Hua Bus	1	19.25	7	1 March 1942	1 January 2009	31 July 2018
阿羅哈汽車客運股份有限公司 阿羅哈客運	Aloha Bus Company, Ltd; Aloha Bus	0	0	0	1999	10 March 2009	28 February 2013
仁友汽車客運股份有限公司 仁友客運	Ren-Yeou Bus Company, Ltd. Renyou Bus	15	297.75	76		31 December 1976	30 April 2023
四方股份有限公司 四方客運	SF E-bus	1	10.20	5	13 May 2015	30 April 2016	31 October 2023
捷順交通股份有限公司 捷順交通	J.S Bus	6	145.35	30	5 October 2015	30 April 2016	23 December 2023

== See also ==
- List of bus routes in Taichung
- Transportation in Taichung
