= Susan Shur-Fen Gau =

Taiwanese pediatric psychiatrist (born 1962)

Gau Shur-Fen
- 高淑芬
- Born: 1962 (age 63–64); Taipei, Taiwan
- Education: Chung Shan Medical University (MD); Yale University (PhD); National Taiwan University (MBA)
- Scientific career
- Fields: Epidemiology
- Institutions: National Taiwan University; Taiwanese Society of Child and Adolescent Psychiatry

Chinese name
- Traditional Chinese: 高淑芬
- Simplified Chinese: 高淑芬
Transcriptions
Standard Mandarin
- Hanyu Pinyin: Gāo shūfēn
- Bopomofo: ㄍㄠ ㄕㄨˊ ㄈㄣ

Gau Shur-Fen (traditional Chinese: 高淑芬; born 1962), also known by her English name Susan Gau, is a Taiwanese psychiatrist and epidemiologist.

== Early life and career ==
Gau was born and raised in Wanhua District, Taipei City. After graduating from Chung Shan Medical University in 1988 with a Doctor of Medicine (M.D.), she completed doctoral studies in the United States at Yale University, where she earned her Ph.D. in epidemiology with honors from the Yale School of Medicine in 2001. In 2004, she earned a Master of Business Administration (M.B.A.) from National Taiwan University.

As a president of the Taiwanese Society of Child and Adolescent Psychiatry and an important member in the Taiwanese Psychiatric Association, she has been making efforts to improve psychiatric environmental methods.

== Research ==
She is one of the pioneers in Taiwan that started Taiwan-based research and enrolled local patients to the domestic clinical trials. Since then, Taiwanese patients' statistics were involved in many secondary thesis such as meta-analysis and systematic reviews.

== Selected publications ==
=== 2019 ===
- Chen, Ying-Yeh; Chen, Yi-Lung; Gau, Susan Shur-Fen (2019-01-01). "Attention-deficit hyperactivity disorder and suicidality: The mediating effects of psychiatric comorbidities and family function". Journal of Affective Disorders. 242: 96–104. doi:10.1016/j.jad.2018.08.023. ISSN 0165-0327. PMID 30173064. S2CID 52168979.

=== 2018 ===
- Ni, Hsing-Chang; Lin, Hsiang-Yuan; Tseng, Wen-Yih Isaac; Chiu, Yen-Nan; Wu, Yu-Yu; Tsai, Wen-Che; Gau, Susan Shur-Fen (2018-03-02). "Neural correlates of impaired self-regulation in male youths with autism spectrum disorder: A voxel-based morphometry study". Progress in Neuro-Psychopharmacology & Biological Psychiatry. 82: 233–241. doi:10.1016/j.pnpbp.2017.11.008. ISSN 0278-5846. PMID 29129723.
- Shang, Chi-Yung; Sheng, Chia; Yang, Li-Kuang; Chou, Tai-Li; Gau, Susan Shur-Fen (June 2018). "Differential brain activations in adult attention-deficit/ hyperactivity disorder subtypes: a counting Stroop functional MRI study". Brain Imaging and Behavior. 12 (3): 882–890. doi:10.1007/s11682-017-9749-0. ISSN 1931-7557. PMID 28699075. S2CID 3993544.
- Chien, Yi-Ling; Hsieh, Ming Hsien; Gau, Susan Shur-Fen (May 2018). "Mismatch Negativity and P3a in Adolescents and Young Adults with Autism Spectrum Disorders: Behavioral Correlates and Clinical Implications". Journal of Autism and Developmental Disorders. 48 (5): 1684–1697. doi:10.1007/s10803-017-3426-4. ISSN 0162-3257. PMID 29198040. S2CID 4701587.
- Bölte, Sven; Mahdi, Soheil; Coghill, David; Gau, Susan Shur-Fen; Granlund, Mats; Holtmann, Martin; Karande, Sunil; Levy, Florence; Rohde, Luis A.; Segerer, Wolfgang; de Vries, Petrus J.; Selb, Melissa (2018-02-12). "Standardised assessment of functioning in ADHD: consensus on the ICF Core Sets for ADHD". European Child & Adolescent Psychiatry. 27 (10): 1261–1281. doi:10.1007/s00787-018-1119-y. hdl:20.500.11937/66499. ISSN 1018-8827. PMID 29435654.
- Lu, Dai-Hua; Liao, Hsiao-Mei; Chen, Chia-Hsiang; Tu, Huang-Ju; Liou, Houng-Chi; Gau, Susan Shur-Fen; Fu, Wen-Mei (2018-02-13). "Impairment of social behaviors in Arhgef10 knockout mice". Molecular Autism. 9 (1): 11. doi:10.1186/s13229-018-0197-5. ISSN 2040-2392. PMC 5810065. PMID 29456827.
- Hwang-Gu, Shoou-Lian; Lin, Hsiang-Yuan; Chen, Yu-Chi; Tseng, Yu-han; Hsu, Wen-Yau; Chou, Miao-Chun; Chou, Wen-Jun; Wu, Yu-Yu; Gau, Susan Shur-Fen (2018-05-30). "Symptoms of ADHD Affect Intrasubject Variability in Youths with Autism Spectrum Disorder: An Ex-Gaussian Analysis". Journal of Clinical Child and Adolescent Psychology. 48 (3): 455–468. doi:10.1080/15374416.2018.1452151. ISSN 1537-4416. PMID 29847154. S2CID 44182343.
- Han, Gloria T.; Chen, Yi-Lung; Tsai, Fang-Ju; Gau, Susan Shur-Fen (2018-08-01). "Temporal and Reciprocal Relations Between ADHD symptoms and Emotional Problems in School-Age Children". Journal of Attention Disorders. 24 (7): 1032–1044. doi:10.1177/1087054718787891. ISSN 1087-0547. PMC 6675667. PMID 30066607.
- Chien, Yi-Ling; Chou, Miao-Chun; Chou, Wen-Jiun; Wu, Yu-Yu; Tsai, Wen-Che; Chiu, Yen-Nan; Gau, Susan Shur-Fen (2018-06-28). "Prenatal and perinatal risk factors and the clinical implications on autism spectrum disorder". Autism. 23 (3): 783–791. doi:10.1177/1362361318772813. ISSN 1362-3613. PMID 29950101. S2CID 49478739.
- Lin, Hsiang-Yuan; Cocchi, Luca; Zalesky, Andrew; Lv, Jinglei; Perry, Alistair; Tseng, Wen-Yih Isaac; Kundu, Prantik; Breakspear, Michael; Gau, Susan Shur-Fen (2018-02-07). "Brain–behavior patterns define a dimensional biotype in medication-naïve adults with attention-deficit hyperactivity disorder". Psychological Medicine. 48 (14): 2399–2408. doi:10.1017/s0033291718000028. ISSN 0033-2917. PMID 29409566. S2CID 4483222.
- Chang, Jane Pei-Chen; Lai, Meng-Chuan; Chou, Miao-Chun; Shang, Chi-Yung; Chiu, Yen-Nan; Tsai, Wen-Che; Wu, Yu-Yu; Gau, Susan Shur-Fen (2018-02-08). "Maternal and Family Processes in Different Subgroups of Youth with Autism Spectrum Disorder". Journal of Abnormal Child Psychology. 47 (1): 177–194. doi:10.1007/s10802-018-0404-z. ISSN 0091-0627. PMID 29417447. S2CID 46849316.
- Lin, Yu-Ju; Gau, Susan Shur-Fen (2018-06-26). "Developmental changes of neuropsychological functioning in individuals with and without childhood ADHD from early adolescence to young adulthood: a 7-year follow-up study". Psychological Medicine. 49 (6): 940–951. doi:10.1017/s0033291718001599. ISSN 0033-2917. PMID 29941053. S2CID 49408023.
- Hsu, Chi-Lin; Chou, Chih-Hsuan; Huang, Shih-Chuan; Lin, Chia-Yi; Lin, Meng-Ying; Tung, Chun-Che; Lin, Chun-Yen; Lai, Ivan Pochou; Zou, Yan-Fang; Youngson, Neil A; Lin, Shau-Ping; Yang, Chang-Hao; Chen, Shih-Kuo; Gau, Susan Shur-Fen; Huang, Hsien-Sung (2018-01-15). "Analysis of experience-regulated transcriptome and imprintome during critical periods of mouse visual system development reveals spatiotemporal dynamics". Human Molecular Genetics. 27 (6): 1039–1054. doi:10.1093/hmg/ddy023. ISSN 0964-6906. PMID 29346572.
- Lin, Chun-Yen; Chang, Kai-Wei; Lin, Chia-Yi; Wu, Jia-Ying; Coon, Hilary; Huang, Pei-Hsin; Ho, Hong-Nerng; Akbarian, Schahram; Gau, Susan Shur-Fen; Huang, Hsien-Sung (2018-03-09). "Allele-specific expression in a family quartet with autism reveals mono-to-biallelic switch and novel transcriptional processes of autism susceptibility genes". Scientific Reports. 8 (1): 4277. Bibcode:2018NatSR...8.4277L. doi:10.1038/s41598-018-22753-4. ISSN 2045-2322. PMC 5844893. PMID 29523860.
- Fan, Li-Ying; Shang, Chi-Yung; Tseng, Wen-Yih Isaac; Gau, Susan Shur-Fen; Chou, Tai-Li (2018-05-10). "Visual processing as a potential endophenotype in youths with attention-deficit/hyperactivity disorder: A sibling study design using the counting Stroop functional MRI". Human Brain Mapping. 39 (10): 3827–3835. doi:10.1002/hbm.24214. ISSN 1065-9471. PMC 6866550. PMID 29749060.
- Chiang, Huey-Ling; Kao, Wei-Chih; Chou, Mei-Chun; Chou, Wen-June; Chiu, Yen-Nan; Wu, Yu-Yu; Gau, Susan Shur-Fen (2018-02-10). "School dysfunction in youth with autistic spectrum disorder in Taiwan: The effect of subtype and ADHD". Autism Research. 11 (6): 857–869. doi:10.1002/aur.1923. ISSN 1939-3792. PMID 29427542. S2CID 46777023.

== See also ==
- List of psychiatrists
