= Transportation in Taichung =

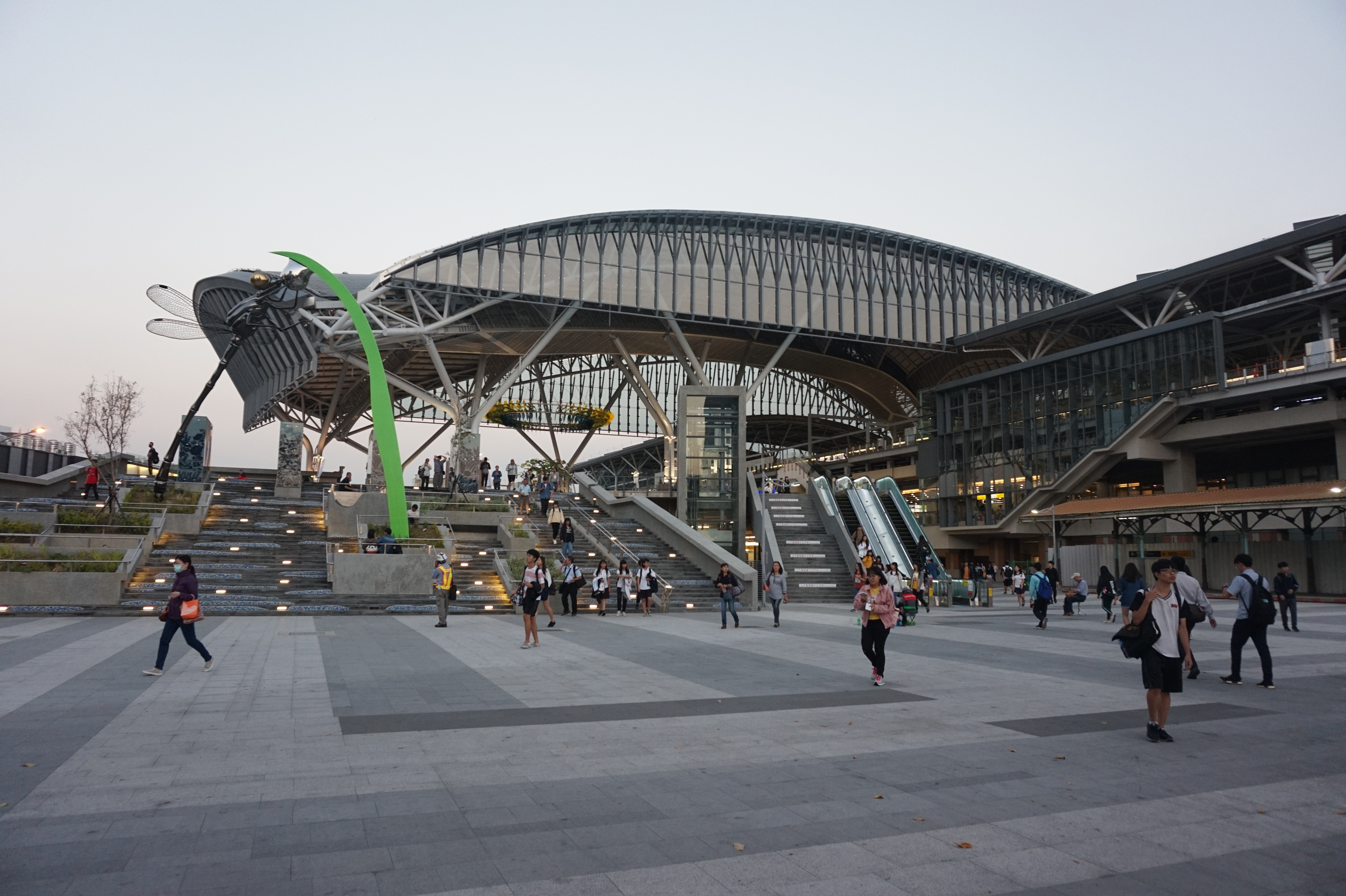
Taichung Railway Station

Taichung is located in central Taiwan and is the second largest city in the island country.

== Train service ==
Taichung Station is located on Jianguo Road (建國路). There is a small square in the front of the station, and numerous bus companies have stations within a three-minute walk of the station. They provide local bus service along with long-distance bus services, many of which are to districts or townships not served by trains. The same pass card can be used for both trains and buses and there are discounts for students and senior citizens.

Taichung Station lies on the mountain line which is formally known as Taichung Line, which splits from the coastal line from Changhua City in the south, to Zhunan, near Hsinchu, in the north. There are regular trains to Changhua from downtown Taichung where the traveller reaches the coastal line. Several train stations lie in different districts in Taichung.

The new High Speed Rail services Metropolitan Taichung via a station in Wuri District. There are regular City Bus services with several routes running between many places and the High Speed Rail Station. There are three or more THSR trains in either direction every hour and it takes under an hour to get to Taipei in the North or Kaohsiung in the South.

== MRT service ==
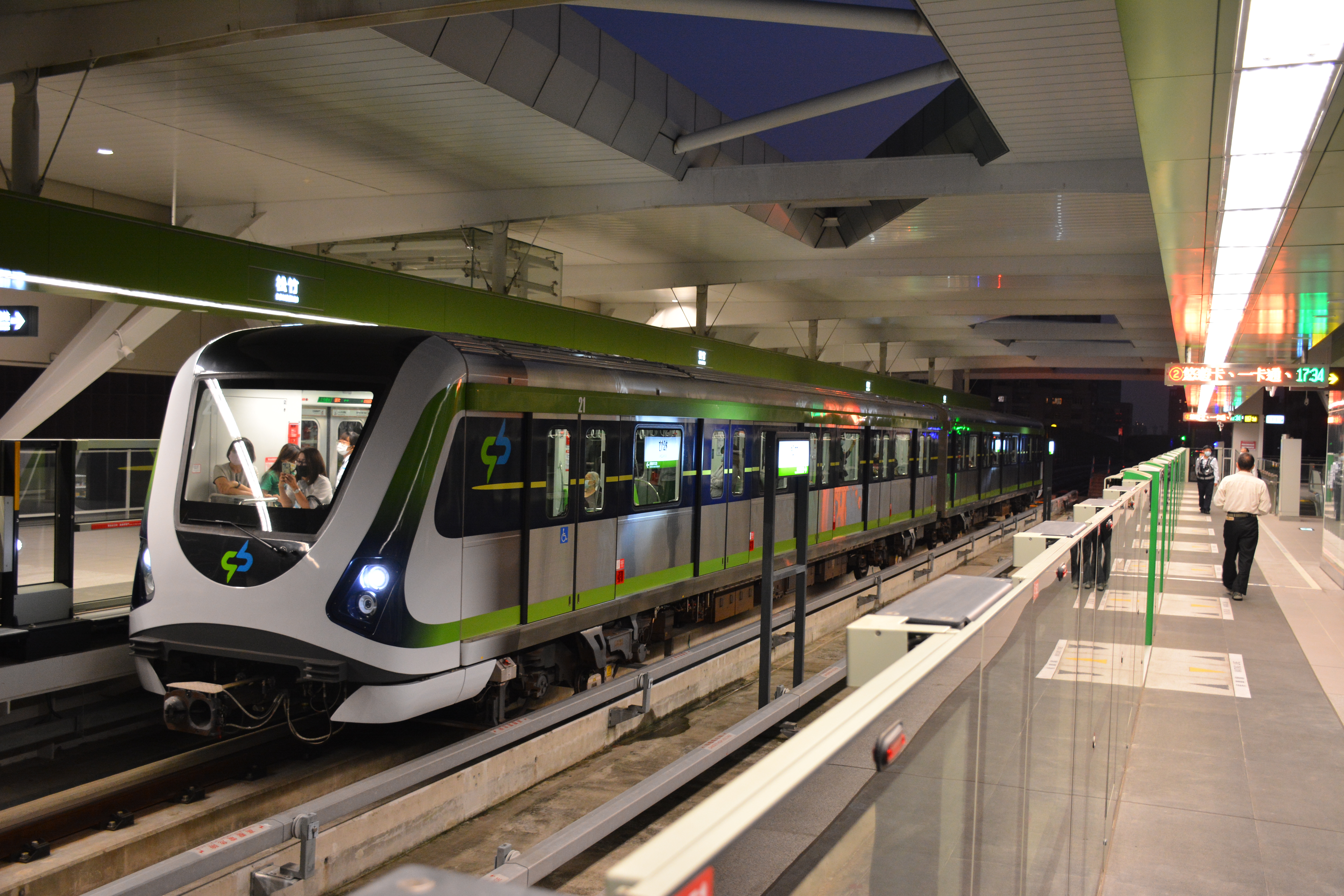
Taichung MRT Green line

The Mass Rapid Transit (MRT) of Taichung is under construction and planning. The Green Line has been under construction since September 2009. The elevated section goes between Fengyuan Station and Daqing Station and service operations began on April 25, 2021. The Green Line, meanwhile, also known as the Wuri-Wenxin-Beitun Line, will connect Dingjiushe to Xinwuri and was also completed for service on April 25, 2021.

== BRT service ==
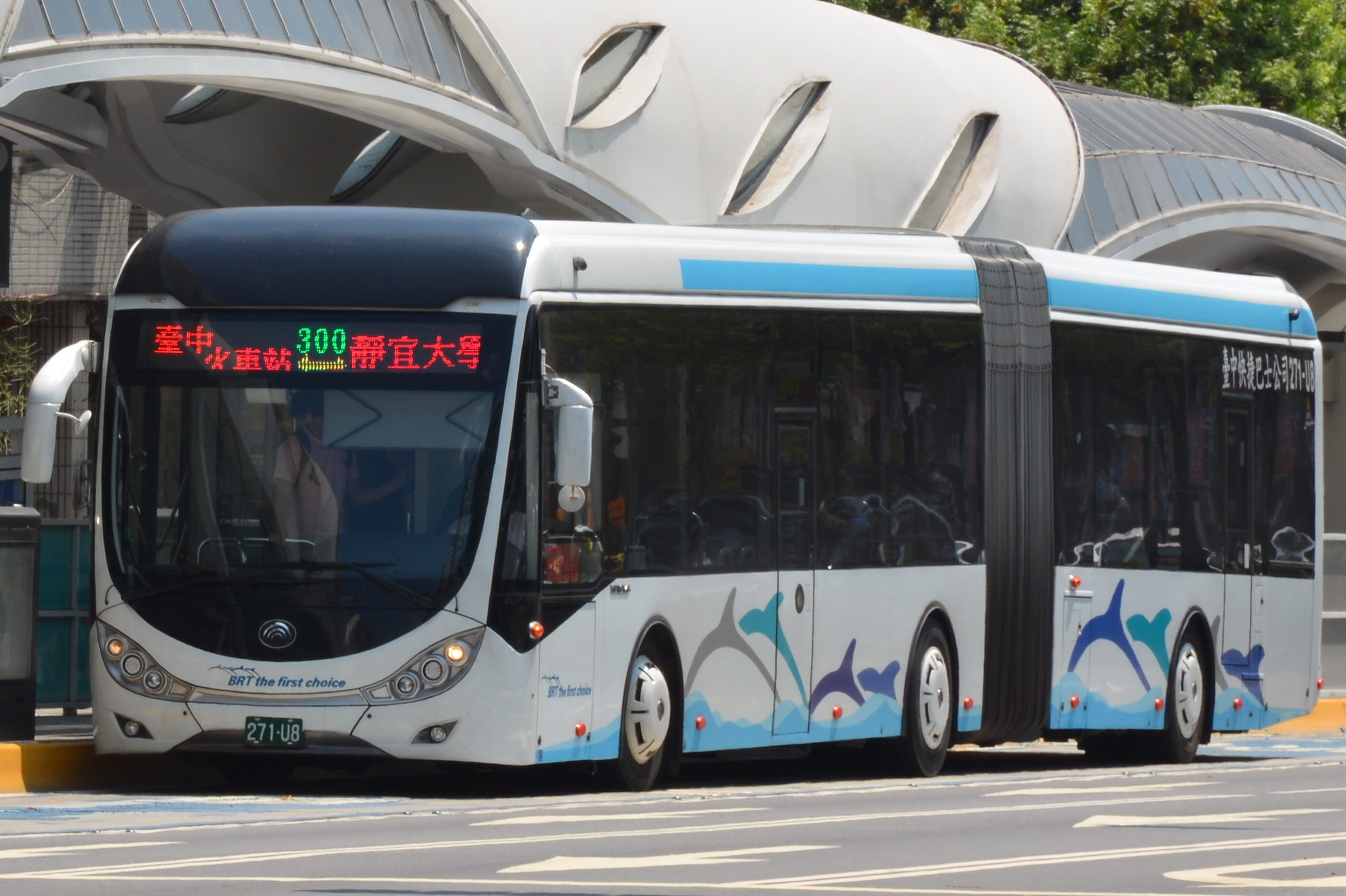
Taichung BRT vehicle

The BRT in Taichung has been planned for years. The company of Taichung BRT was established on 17 October 2012, and the construction of the Blue Line priority section lying on Taiwan Boulevard (臺灣大道) started 17 July 2013. The priority section of Blue Line, with half of the stations open, started operation on 28 July 2014, and all stations along the section will be open on 17 August 2014. Taking the BRT is free for the first year.

The BRT service ended on 8 July 2015 because of the new policy announced on 30 March 2015. The BRT Lane was adjusted to ordinary Bus Lane, allowing its lane room to a few other routes which mainly operate along Taiwan Boulevard. From then on, the BRT Blue Line was no longer called BRT Blue Line but Bus Route 300 instead.

the former BRT Blue Line (藍線) (from 28 July 2014 to 7 July 2015)
Station Number	Station Name (Chinese)	Station Name (English)	Location
A01	臺中火車站	Taichung Railway Station	In front of Taichung Railway Station (Jianguo Rd.) (建國路)
A03	仁愛醫院 (僅西行)	Jen-Ai Hospital (only westbound)	Liuchuan E. Rd. (柳川東路)/Xingzhong St. (興中街) Intersection
A05	茄苳腳	Qie Dong Jiao	Meichuan W. Rd. (梅川西路)/Duxin St. (篤信街) Intersection
A06	中正國小	Chung-Cheng Elementary School	Daren St. (大仁街)/Yingcai Rd. (英才路) Intersection
A07	科博館	National Museum of Natural Science	Jianxing Rd. (健行路)/Meicun Rd. (美村路) Intersection
A08	忠明國小	Chung-Ming Elementary School	Zhongming Rd. (忠明路)/Zhongming S. Rd. (忠明南路) Intersection
A09	頂何厝	Ding He Cuo	Hankou Rd. (漢口路)/Dongxing Rd. (東興路) Intersection
A10	市政府	Taichung City Hall	Wenxin Rd. (文心路) Intersection
A11	新光/遠百	Shin Kong Mitsukoshi/Top City Dept. Store	Huilai Rd. (惠來路) Intersection
A12	秋紅谷	Maple Valley Garden	Chaofu Rd. (朝富路) Intersection
A13	福安	Fu-An	Anhe Rd. (安和路) Intersection
A14	中港新城	Zhonggang New Community	Zhonggong Third Rd. (中工三路)/Yongfu Rd. (永福路) Intersection
A15	中港澄清	Cheng Ching Hospital	Fukang Rd. (福康路)/Zhonggong Second Rd. (中工二路) Intersection
A16	玉門路	Yumen Rd.	Yumen Rd. (玉門路) Intersection
A17	榮總/東海大學	Taichung Veterans General Hospital/Tunghai University	Dongda Rd. (東大路) Intersection
A18	東海別墅	Dong Hai Bie Shu Shopping District	Guoji St. (國際街)/Dongyuan Ln. (東園巷) Intersection
A19	坪頂	Ping Ding	Youyuan Rd. (遊園路) Intersection
A20	正英路	Zhengying Rd.	Zhengying Rd. (正英路) Intersection
A21	弘光科技大學	Hungkuang University	In front of Hungkuang University
A22	晉江寮	Jin Jiang Liao	Dongjin E. Rd. (東晉東路) Intersection
A23	靜宜大學	Providence University	In front of Providence University

== Taichung City Bus ==
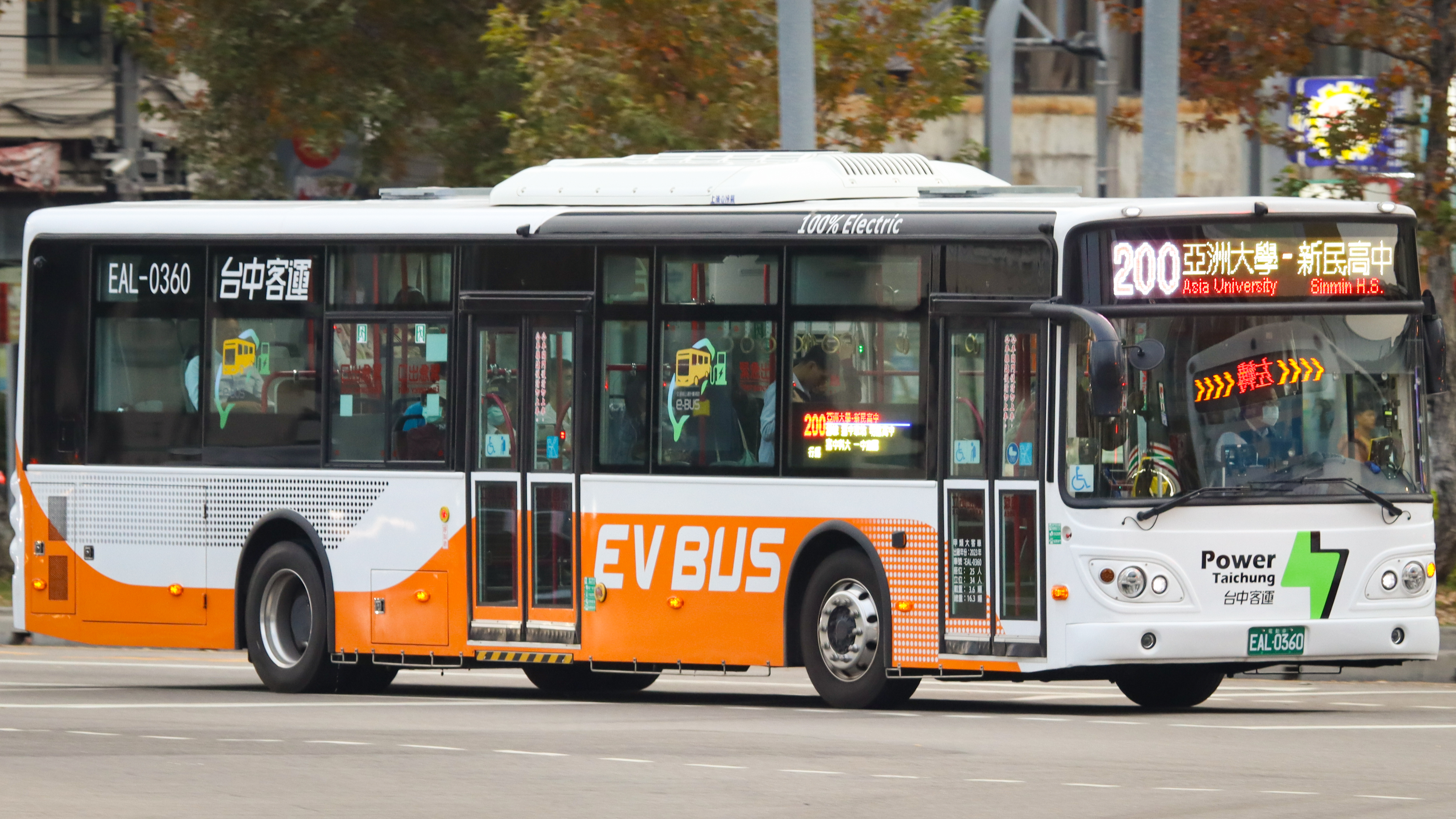
Taichung City Bus vehicle

There have been slightly more than 200 routes in the network of Taichung City Bus at present in 2015.

The fares are calculated by mileage per ride. The basic fare is NT$20 for 10 km, and the extended fare is NT$2.431*(1+5% tax included) per km and round to the nearest integer.

== Long distance bus service ==
Seven bus companies offer service from Taichung city to points outside the Taichung area. Some of the local bus companies have received permission to establish routes to e.g., Taipei.

- Changhua Bus Company – Through its hub in Changhua City, just to the south of Taichung, Changhua Bus Company offers service to most of Changhua County as well as popular spots in Nantou County, including Nantou City, Caotun, and Puli.
- Yuanlin Bus Company – Like Changhua Bus Company, it is based in Changhua County, though in the town of Yuanlin, which is south of Changhua City. Many buses travel between downtown Taichung and its hub of Yuanlin. From there, it is possible to get buses to most of southern and western Changhua County as well as to Lugang on the coast.
- U-Bus Company – U-Bus has routes all over western Taiwan from Taipei to Kaohsiung. They offer service to those two cities, as well as Tainan City and the Taiwan Taoyuan International Airport. They offer service both from the Taichung Train Station and the Chaoma Bus Station.
- Kuo-kuang Bus Company – Kuo-Kuang has a national reach with bus stations all over the country. The main Taichung station is located adjacent to Taichung's main train station. They also have stations at Chaoma and Shuinan. They offer service to many places, including Taipei, Kaohsiung, Tainan, Hsinchu, Keelung, Banciao, and Sun Moon Lake.
- Dragon Bus Company – Dragon bus primarily offers to and from Taipei. Their main Taichung station is at Gancheng, but they offer stops all along Taichung Harbor Road to the expressway that leads to and from Taipei City.
- Free Go (Flying Dog) – Free Go (or Flying Dog as its Chinese name translates as) offers service primarily from Taichung City to Taipei City and the Taiwan Taoyuan International Airport. Their main Taichung station is at Gancheng, but they pick up and drop off passengers at locations including the Taichung Train Station, Chungshan Medical University, Chaoma and Shuinan.
- Ho-Hsin Bus Company – Ho-Hsin offers service to Taipei, Kaohsiung, and Zhongli.

== iBike ==
Since July 2014, Taichung City started the Public Bicycles Renting Service, which is called iBike in Taichung. It belongs to the same system, YouBike, as Metropolitan Taipei (Taipei City and New Taipei City), Changhua County, Taoyuan City and Hsinchu City do. The service spots are continually added around downtown Taichung. There have been at least 306 service spots around all 29 districts in Taichung since 18 September 2018.

== Sea port ==
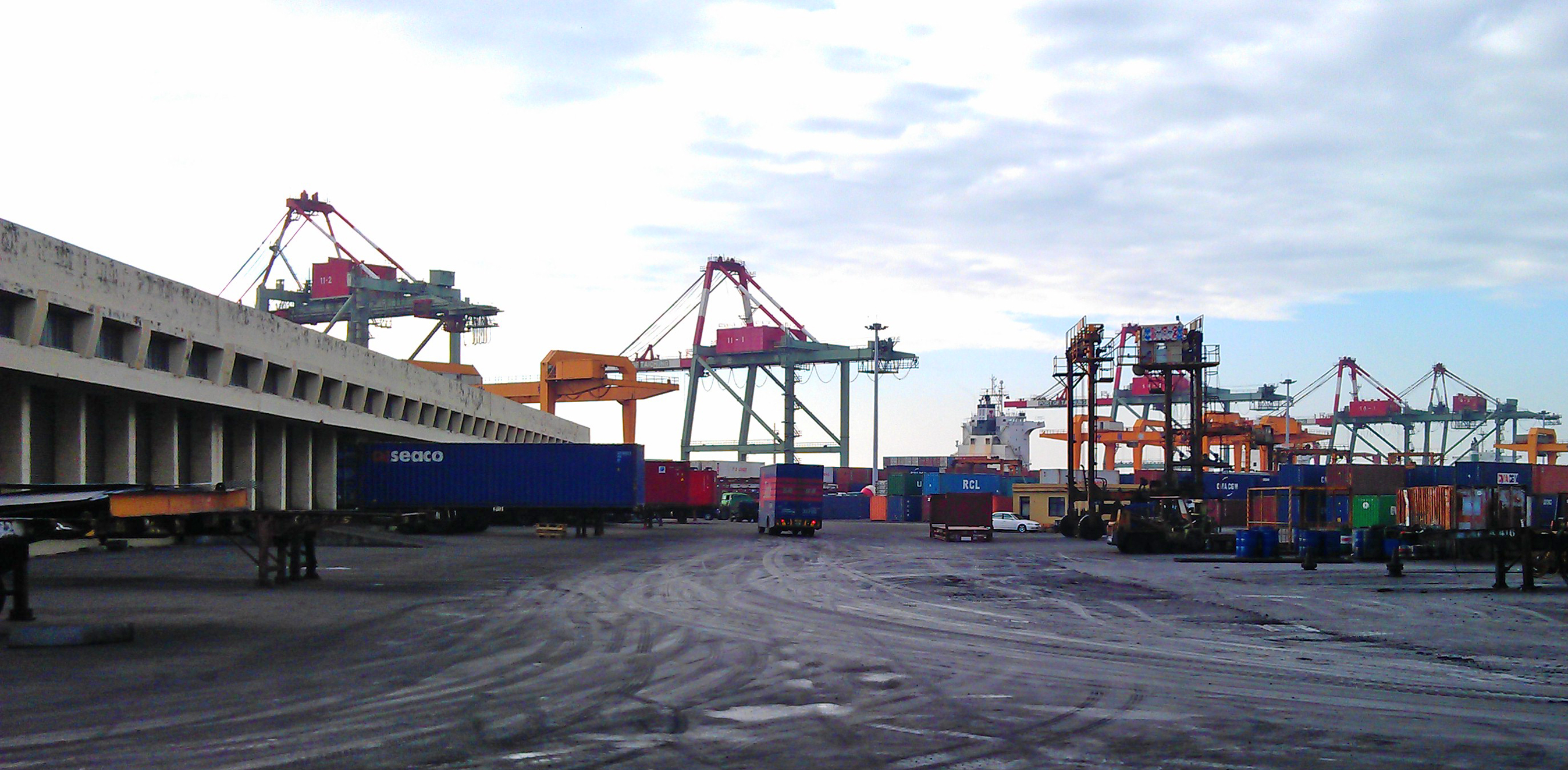
Port of Taichung

Port of Taichung, located on the coast of Taichung, is the second largest cargo facility on the island capable of handling container shipping. Despite being the second largest port on the island of Taiwan, there are no regular passenger ferry services available and the port is closed to unauthorized personnel.

== Freeways and expressways ==
National Highway No. 1, also known as the Sun Yat-Sen Freeway, passes through the western part of the city and has three interchanges in Taichung City. One is at Zhongqing Road (中清路), another at Taichung Harbor Road (中港路) and the southernmost at Wuquan West Road (五權西路).

Taichung-Changhua Expressway (中彰快速道路) is the main stretch of Provincial Highway No. 74 that runs from northwestern Taichung to the northern part of Changhua City (in Changhua County) just to the south of Taichung. At some points, it is just a few dozen meters east of the Sun Yat-Sen Freeway. While it does not connect directly to that highway, it does have an interchange with National Highway No. 3 in Taichung, where one can then access it in a couple of minutes.

Taichung-Nantou Expressway (中投公路) also known as Provincial Highway No. 63, runs from Taichung's Dali District to Nantou County. It can be accessed from downtown Taichung by driving on Wuquan South Road, where it becomes the Taichung-Nantou Expressway. While there is no direct interchange with National Highway No. 3, one can get off in Wufeng District and, after about two minutes on surface roads, easily access the highway.

== Taichung International Airport ==
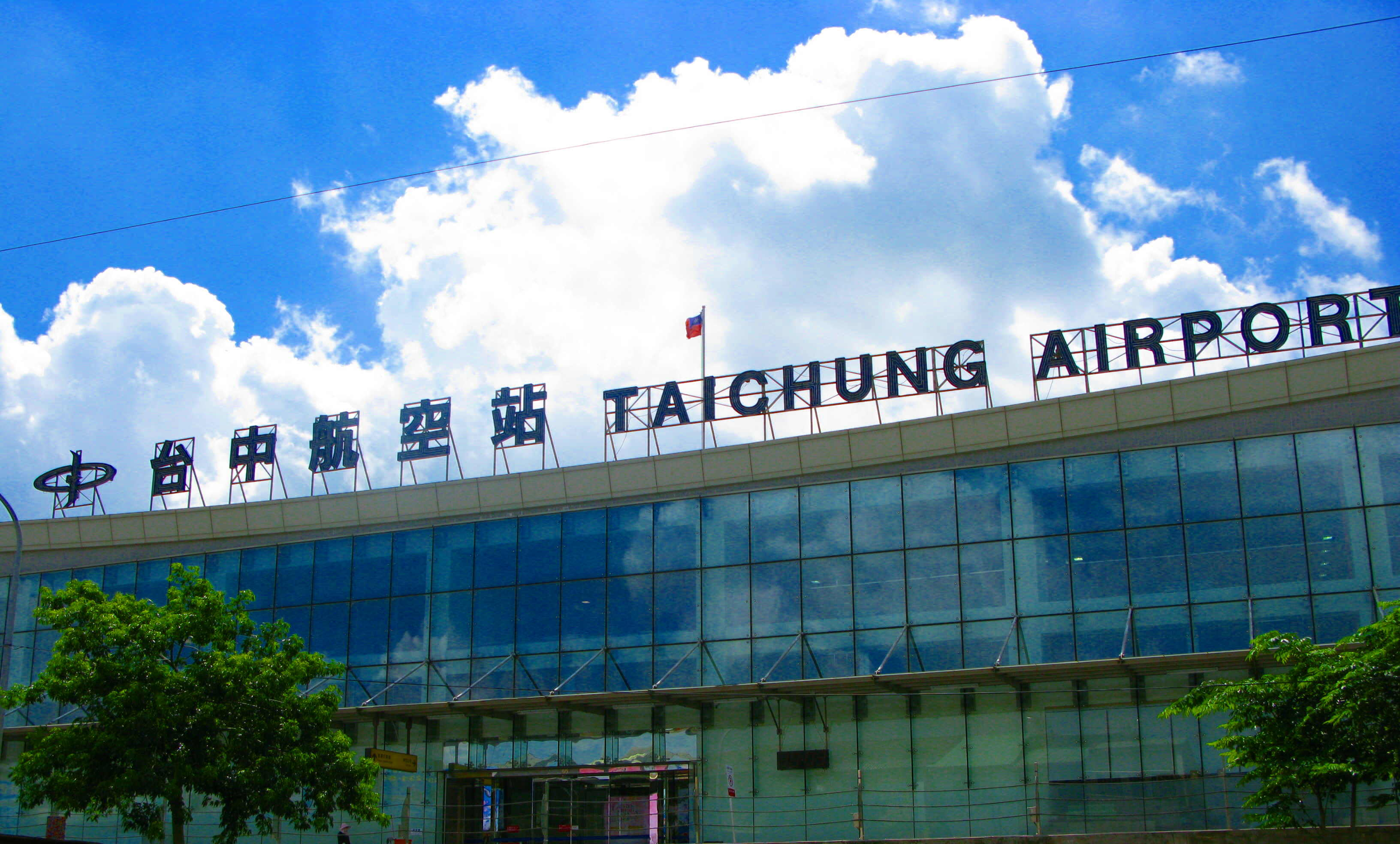
Taichung Airport

Taichung International Airport is the third and newest international airport in Taiwan.

The Taichung Airport civilian terminal is located on the western corner of CCK Air Force Base, 20 kilometers (12 mi) from downtown Taichung City. The main road linking Taichung and the airport is Zhongqing Road (Provincial Route 10.) The airport is located within a kilometer (1,100 yd) of the Shalu (沙鹿) Exit on National Highway Number 3.

In 2002, the Ministry of Transportation and Communications began working on a plan to move air traffic from Taichung's Shuinan Airport to Qingquangang (CCK) Air Force base to convert CCK into an international airport, since CCK had longer runways to allow for larger aircraft. The airport opened in early 2004. The opening of The Taichung Airport did spark a spat of partisan controversy about being incomplete and safety concerns were raised.

Taichung's airport handles scheduled domestic flights between Taichung and Hualien, Penghu, Nangan, and Kinmen, as well as many international destinations.

== See also ==
- Transportation in Taiwan
