= Wuquan railway station =

Railway station located in Taichung, Taiwan

Wuquan 五權
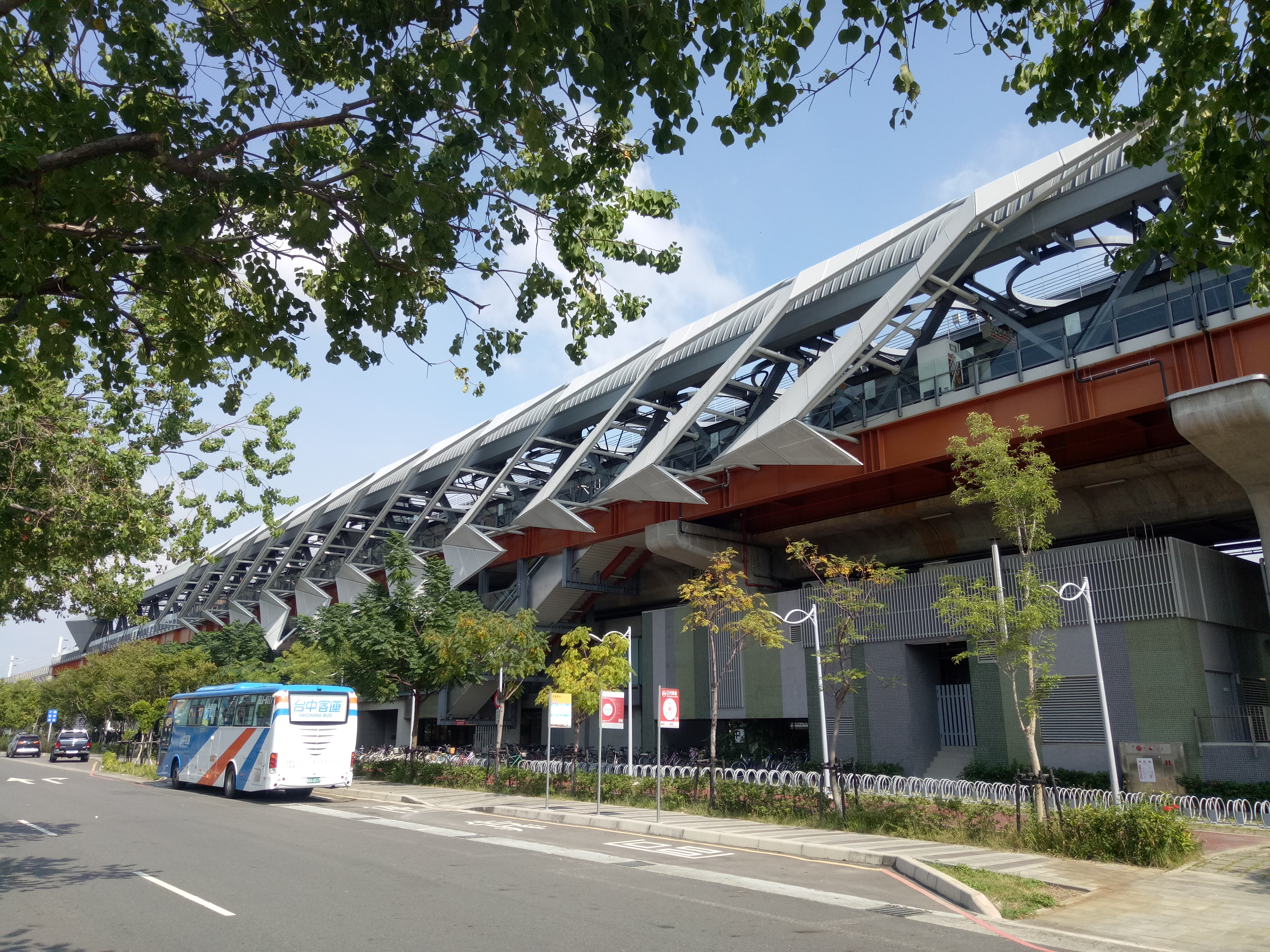

General information
- Location: South, Taichung, Taiwan
- Coordinates: 24°07′44.9″N 120°40′02.5″E
- System: TR railway station
- Line: Western Trunk line
- Distance: 195.3 km to Keelung
- Connections: Local bus

Construction
- Structure type: Elevated

History
- Opened: 2018-10-28

Services
Preceding station	Taiwan Railway	Following station
Taichung towards Keelung	Western Trunk line	Daqing towards Kaohsiung
Location
- Location within Taiwan

Wuquan station
- Traditional Chinese: 五權車站
Transcriptions
Standard Mandarin
- Hanyu Pinyin: wǔquán chēzhàn
- Bopomofo: ㄨˇ ㄑㄩㄢˊ ㄔㄜ ㄓㄢˋ

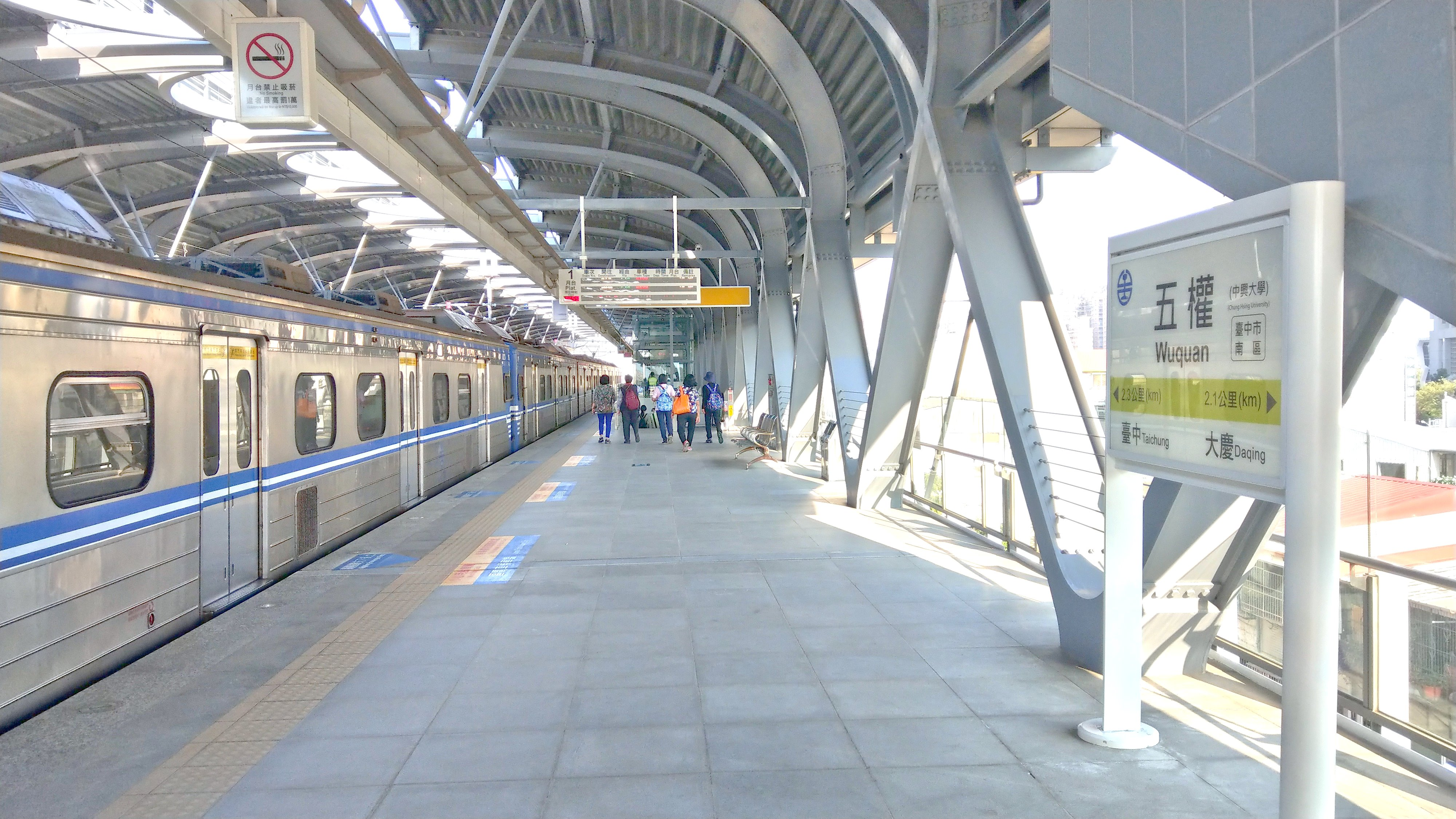
Station platform

Wuquan (Chinese: 五權車站; pinyin: Wǔquán Chēzhàn) is a railway station located in South District, Taichung, Taiwan. It is owned by Taiwan Railway and is on the Taichung Line. It opened on October 28, 2018. The station is categorized as a B-class local station and is served by local trains only.

The name means "five powers" and is derived from nearby Wuquan Road, which references Taiwan's five branches of government.

== Location ==
Wuquan station is located at the intersection between Jianguo and Sanmin Roads. It is located near the National Library of Public Information and the Taichung Courthouse.
