= Taiwanese Society of Child and Adolescent Psychiatry =

- 台灣兒童青少年精神醫學會
- Abbreviation: TSCAP
- Predecessor: Child and Adolescent's Academic Committee of Taiwanese Psychiatric Association
- Formation: November 7, 1998; 27 years ago
- Founder: 徐澄清、宋維村、陳映雪、陳喬琪、沈君傑、沈晟、陳俊鶯、鄭琿、丘彥南、李鶯喬、王雅琴、鄒國蘇、陳美珠等
- Founded at: Taiwan
- Tax ID no.: 19328666
- Purpose: Facilitating health care of child and adolescent psychiatry
- Headquarters: Taipei City, Taiwan
- Location: 9F, -3, No.22, Songjiang Rd., Jhongshan District, Taipei City 104, Taiwan
- Services: Professional training
- Fields: Child and Adolescent Psychiatry
- Official language: Chinese language
- Director: Chen Chih-Tsai (Chinese:陳質采) (Predecessor:Susan Shur-Fen Gau)
- Main organ: 《Child and Adolescent Psychiatry Communication》(兒童青少年精神醫學通訊)
- Staff: Chun-Ing Chan (張春瑛)
- Website: www.tscap.org.tw
- Tel: +886-2-25682083; Fax: +886-2-25683463

Taiwanese Society of Child and Adolescent Psychiatry is a Taiwan-based union of child and adolescent psychiatrists founded in November 7, 1998 with the mission to promote the healthy development of children, adolescents, and families through advocacy, education, and research, and to assist members to meet the professional requirements of child and adolescent psychiatrists throughout their careers.

== Duty ==
- Grant license to PGYs.
- Offer health information to public.
- Myth clarification.
- Holding academic conference in a regular basis.
