= Cultural Heritage Park =

Venue in South, Taichung, Taiwan

- 台中文化資產園區
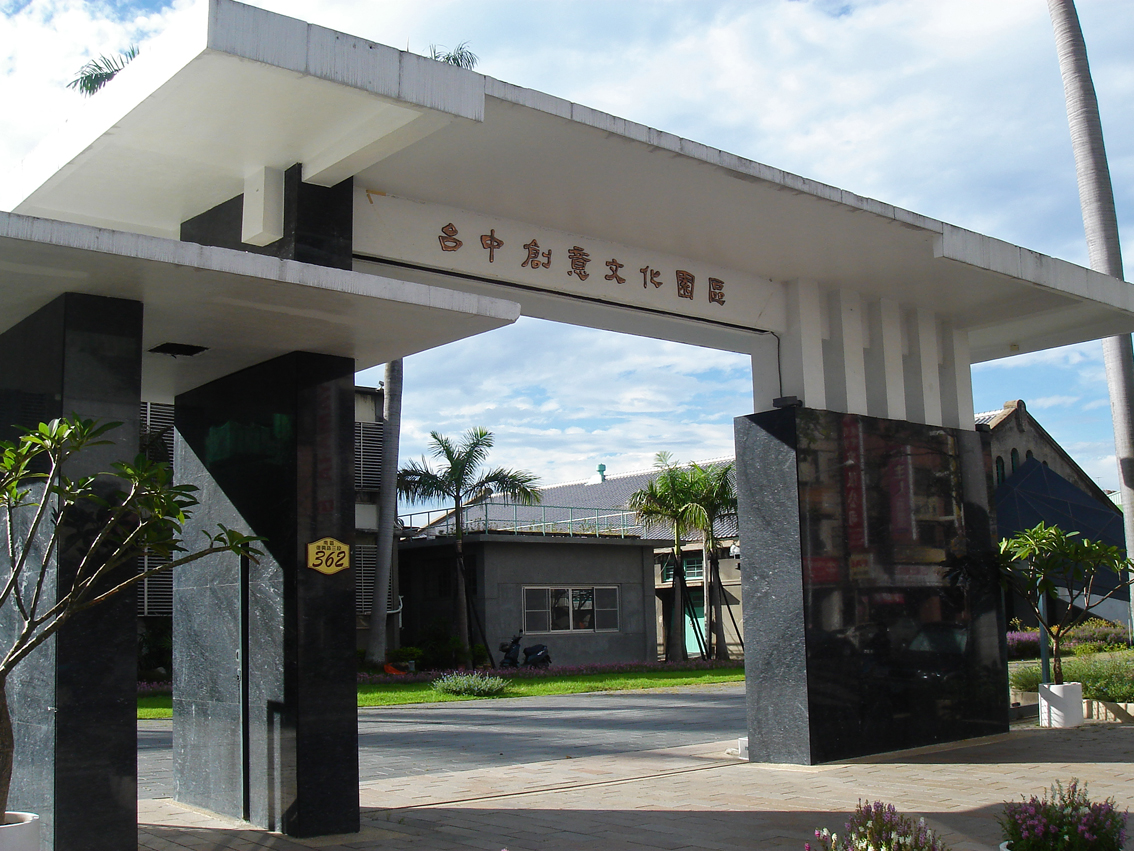
- Interactive map of Cultural Heritage Park
- Former names: Taichung Cultural and Creative Industries Park
- Location: South, Taichung, Taiwan
- Coordinates: 24°07′59″N 120°40′51″E
- Owner: Ministry of Culture

Construction
- Opened: 1916
- Renovated: 30 July 2018

Website
- Official website (in Chinese)

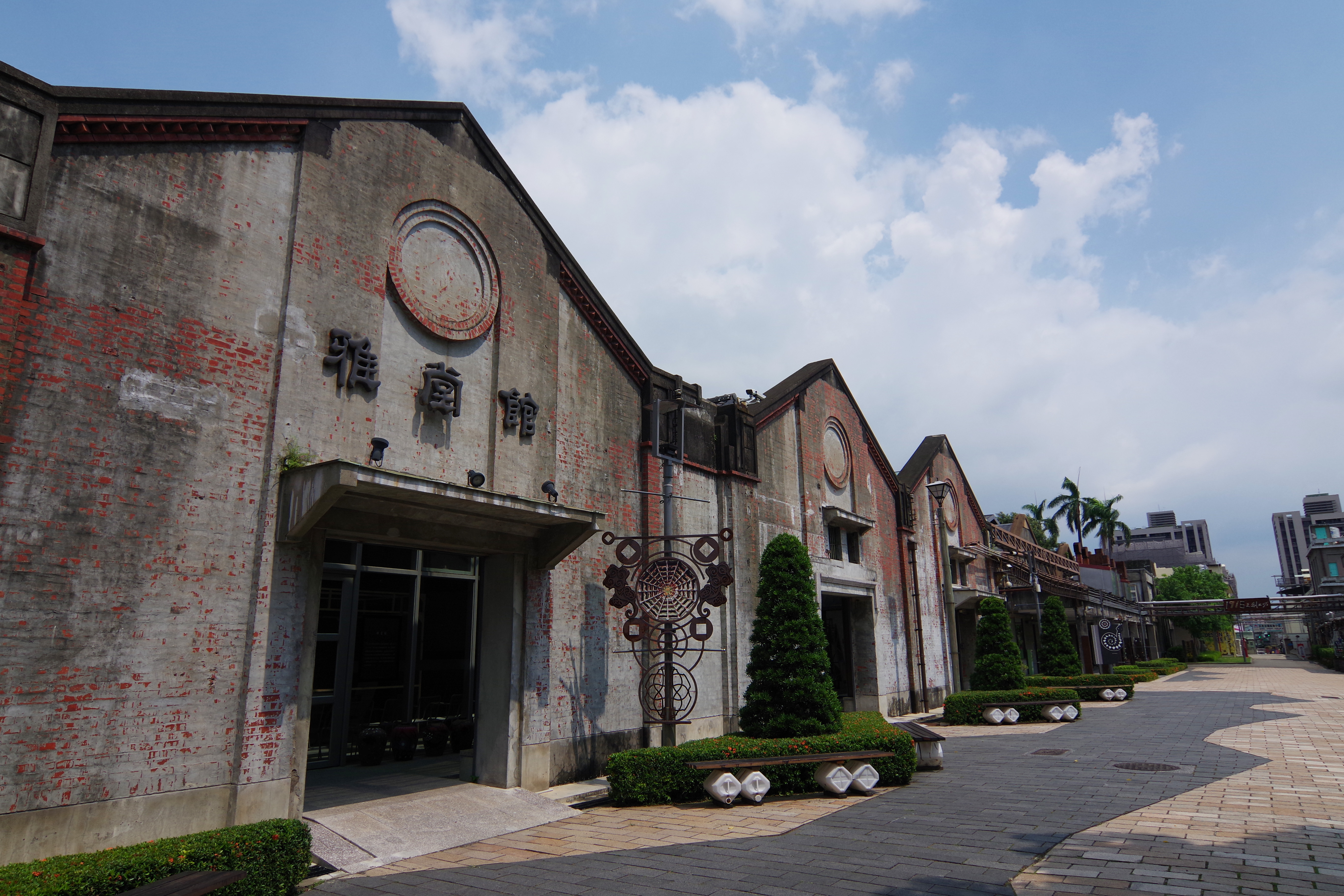
Former brewery buildings

The Cultural Heritage Park (CHP; traditional Chinese: 台中文化資產園區; simplified Chinese: 台中文化资产园区; pinyin: Táizhōng Wénhuà Zīchǎn Yuánqū) is a multifunctional park in South District, Taichung, Taiwan.

== History ==
The buildings in the park were originally built in 1916 as brewery factory during the Japanese rule of Taiwan. After the handover of Taiwan from Japan to the Republic of China in 1945, the area was taken over by Taiwan Tobacco and Wine Monopoly Bureau. It continued the brewing business until the urban sprawl of Taichung City forced the factory production to relocate in 1998. The area was then left abandoned.

In 2002, the Taichung City Government designated 16 out of 28 buildings in the area as historic monuments. In 2007, the Council for Cultural Affairs took over the area and initiated redevelopment works. Two year later in 2009, it was opened to the public as the Taichung Cultural and Creative Industries Park for art exhibition and performance venue. On 30 July 2018, it was relaunched as Cultural Heritage Park for heritage research and restoration venue in a ceremony attended by Culture Minister Cheng Li-chun.

== Architecture ==
The park spans over an area of 5.6 hectares. The park consists of exhibition halls where they exhibit the works of modern designers and architects, as well as contemporary cultural products and handicrafts.

== Transportation ==
The park is accessible within walking distance South West from Taichung Station of Taiwan Railway.

== See also ==
- List of tourist attractions in Taiwan
