= Five Springs Park =

Park in Lanzhou, Gansu, China

The Five Springs Park is located in the northwest part of Gaolan Mountain. The mountain lies in the south part of Lanzhou City, Gansu Province. With a total area of 266,400 square meters, the Five Springs Park is the largest in Lanzhou.

== Mythological Origin ==
The Five Springs Park, like many other scenic places in China, has a history that originates in mythology. According to legend, the springs formed during the Western Han Dynasty (206 B.C.- 24 A.D.). One of the Dynasty's most famous generals, Huo Qubing, was sent by the Emperor to on a punitive expedition into the stronghold of the Hun people, in the northwestern part of China. Traveling from Chang'an (now Xi'an), General Huo and his soldiers traveled for several days on end before arriving at the foot of the Gaolan Mountain. Wearied and out of water, the army began to search for water. When water could be found nowhere, General Huo lashed his horsewhip five times into the ground. Such was the force in his blows that immediately five springs began spouting water. From that day onward place came to be known as the Five Springs Mountain.

== Park History ==
The magical emergence of the springs easily lead to the perception that the story is fake or at least exaggerated. But the five springs still remain. The five springs have flowed since time immemorial, providing water to the people of the region. The region was officially declared a park in 1955.

== The Middle Peak and The Springs ==
The Middle Peak of the Five Springs Mountain, thus named because of its central location within the park, is the highest point in the park. It rises 1,600 meters (5,200 feet) above sea level. On either side of this peak are the Meng Spring and Hui Spring. The other three springs, namely Ganlu, Juyue, and Mozi are scattered around the park.

Ganlu Spring is located near Mani Temple, a sacred site for followers of Tibetan Buddhism. Ganlu translates as 'sweet dew' or 'timely rain' in English. According to mythology, ancient Chinese emperors and officials often prayed to the god of agriculture to bestow rain. The mountaintop is believed to be the site of sacrificial offerings, which were made for rain. When it rained, the people, believing it to be the rain provided by the gods, referred to it as timely rain or sweet dew.

Juyue Spring is regarded as the most beautiful of all five springs. This is largely owing to its unique shape, which is like a well. The name is derived from two words, ‘Ju’ meaning ‘to hold something in two hands’ and ‘Yue’ meaning ‘moon’. The meaning of the two words combine to form the ‘spring that could hold the moon in her hands'. The moon reflecting on the water of this spring is a big attraction during autumn.

Mozi Spring is remarkable for the superstitious beliefs attached to it. Its name reflects this quite clearly. It means ‘to touch or feel the stone to learn the gender of a fetus’. The Dizang Temple, which is dedicated to the Buddha in charge of birth, is located in the vicinity of this spring. There is a belief that the spring can help people know whether a pregnant lady will deliver a boy or a girl.
