= Daqing station =

Railway and metro station located in Taichung, Taiwan

Daqing 大慶
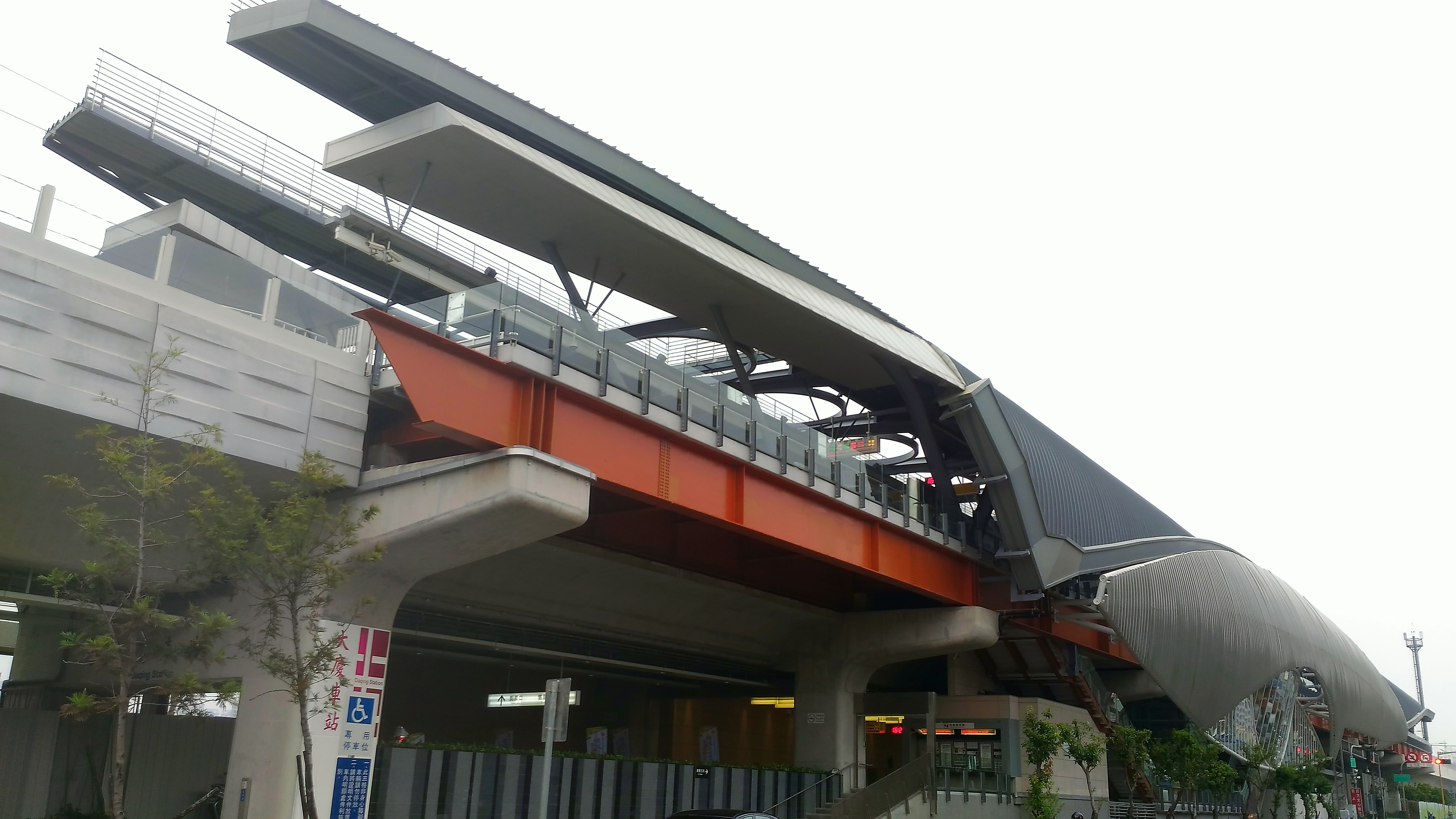

General information
- Location: South, Taichung, Taiwan
- Coordinates: 24°07′07.8″N 120°38′52.2″E
- System: TRA railway station
- Owner: Taiwan Railway Corporation
- Operator: Taiwan Railway Corporation
- Line: Taichung
- Train operators: Taiwan Railway Corporation

History
- Opened: 7 July 1998; 16 October 2016 (elevated)

Passengers
- 6,431 daily (2024)

Services
Preceding station	Taiwan Railway	Following station
Wuchuan towards Keelung	Western Trunk line	Wuri towards Kaohsiung
Location

Daqing 115 大慶
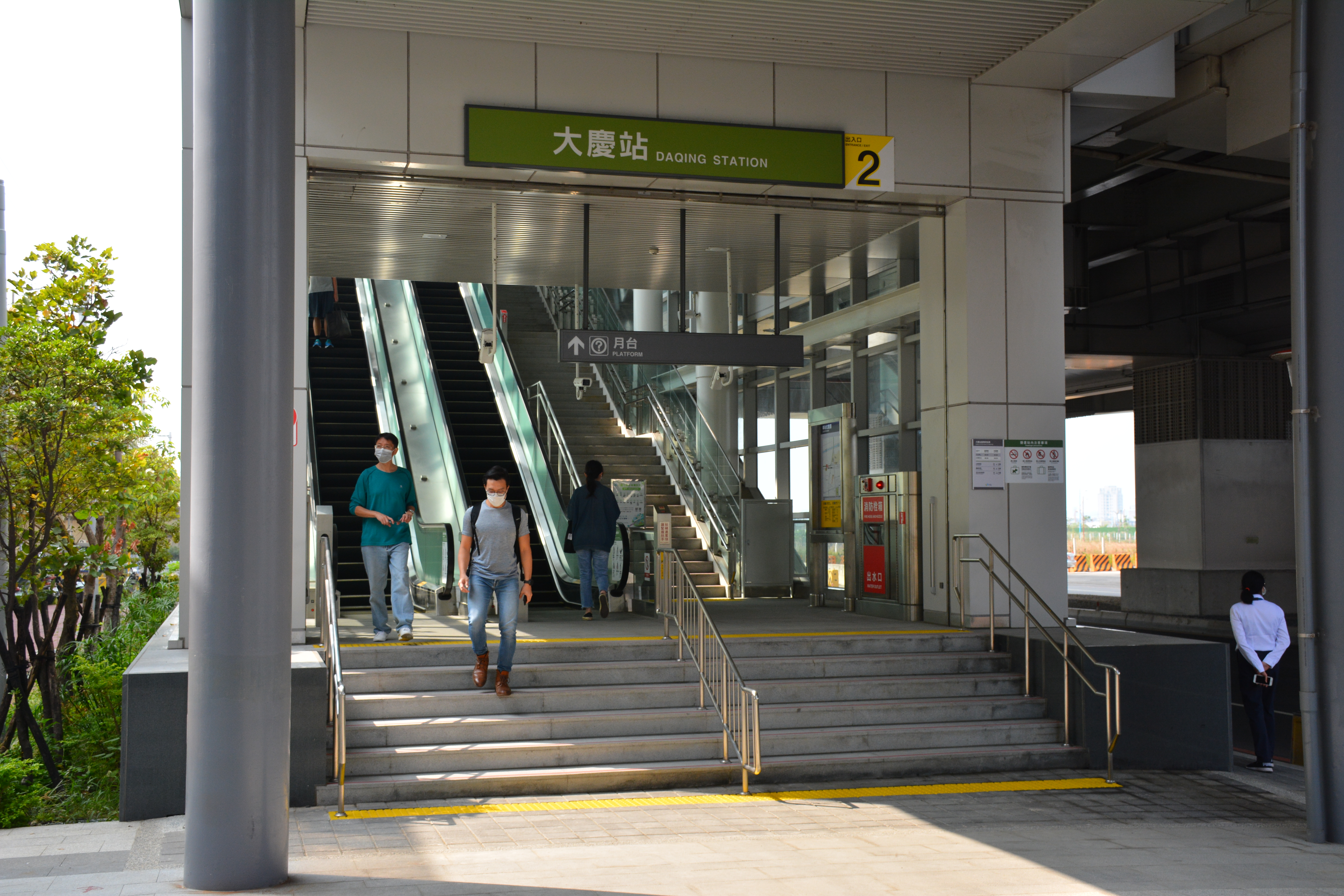

General information
- Operator: Taichung MRT
- Line: Green line
- Platforms: 2 side platforms

Construction
- Structure type: Elevated

Other information
- Station code: 115

History
- Opened: 25 April 2021

Services
Preceding station	Taichung MRT	Following station
Jiuzhangli towards HSR Taichung Station	Green line	Feng-le Park towards Beitun Main
Location

Daqing station (Chinese: 大慶車站; Hanyu Pinyin: Dàqìng Chēzhàn; Tongyong Pinyin: Dàcìng Chejhàn) is a railway and metro station located in South District, Taichung, Taiwan. It is served by the Taiwan Railway and Taichung MRT. The metro station opened on December 19, 2020.

== Overview ==
The station began as a TRA at-grade local station. The TRA station was elevated on October 28, 2018, as part of the modernization process on the Taichung line. The metro portion of the station is also elevated, and the two are connected by a bridge.

The station is primarily serviced by local trains (區間車). A few times per day a Chu-Kuang Express (莒光號) or a Tzu-Chiang Limited Express (自強號) stops at the station.

=== Station layout ===
Side platform
	← Taichung Line: towards Changhua, Kaohsiung (Wuri)
	Taichung Line: towards Zhunan, Taipei (Wuquan) →
Side platform
1F	Lobby	Station entrance, ticketing machine, information counter

== Around the station ==
- Chungshan Medical University
- Fengle Sculpture Park
- Taichung Municipal Taichung Industrial High School
- Taichung Mosque

== See also ==
- List of railway stations in Taiwan
