= South District, Taichung =

District of Taichung, Taiwan

Coordinates: 24°7′17.7″N 120°39′55.7″E

South 南區
- District
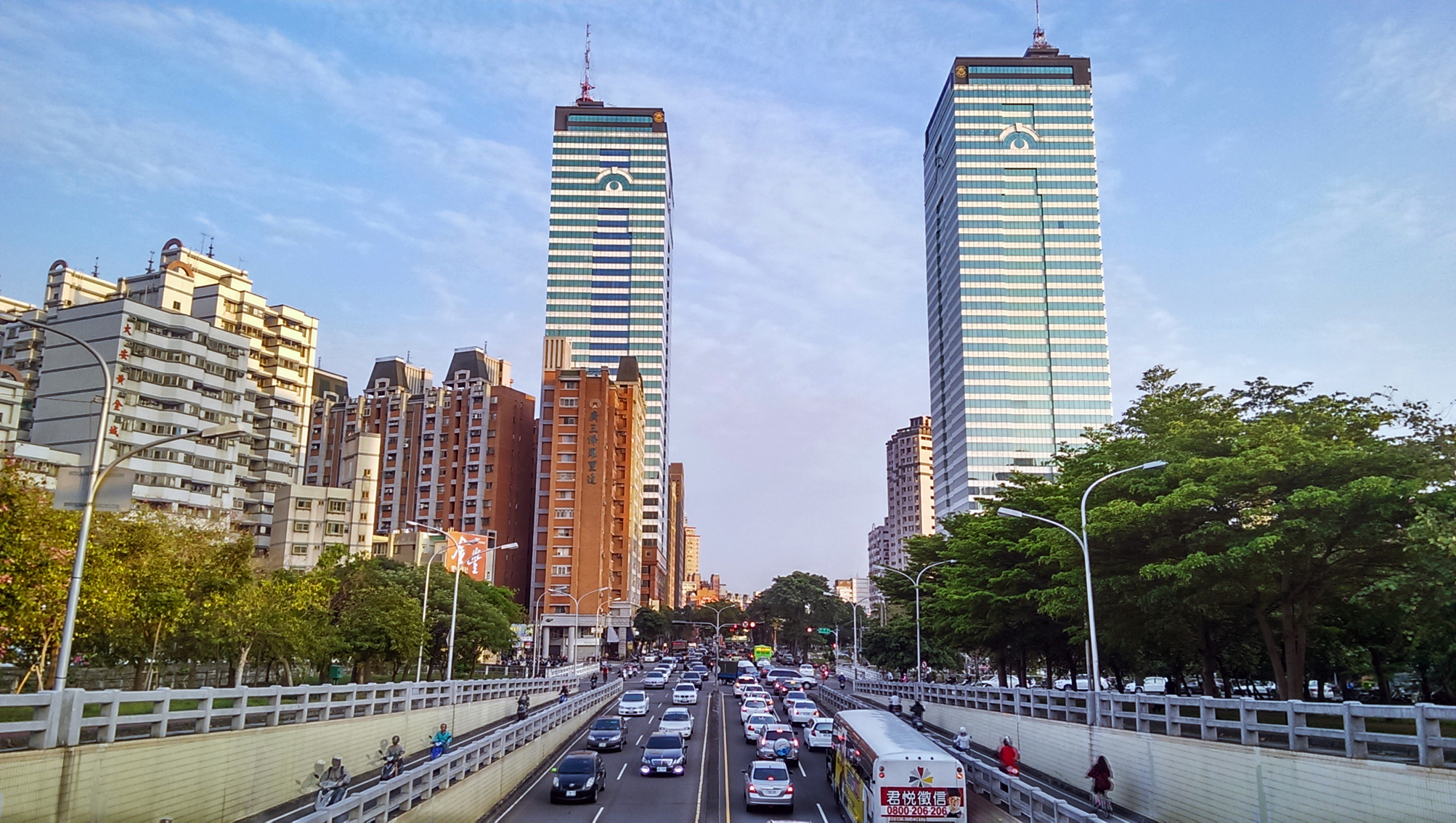

- South District in Taichung City
- Location: Taichung, Taiwan

Area
  - Total: 6.8 km^{2} (2.6 sq mi)

Population (February 2023)
  - Total: 125,800
  - Density: 18,000/km^{2} (48,000/sq mi)
- Website: www.south.taichung.gov.tw (in Chinese)

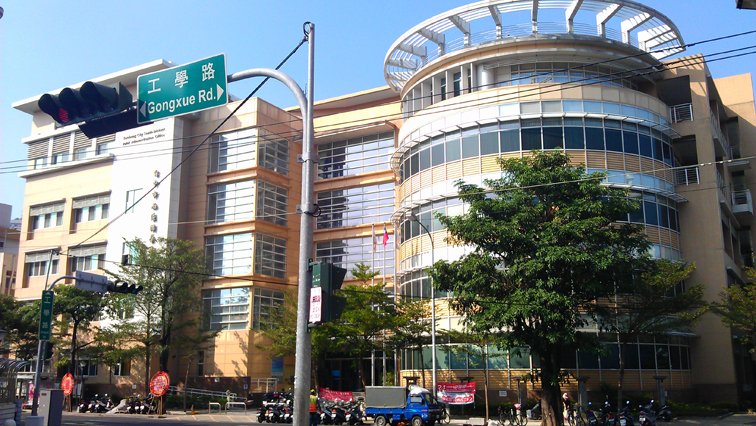
South District Office

South District (Chinese: 南區; pinyin: Nán Qū) is an urban district in Taichung, Taiwan.

== History ==
The district used to be part of Taichung provincial city before the merger with Taichung County to form Taichung special municipality on 25 December 2010.

== Administrative divisions ==
Zhangchun, Zhangrong, Chenghuang, Guoguang, Nanmen, Deyi, Jishan, Jiangchuan, Xinrong, Fuxing, Fuping, Fushun, Heping, Pinghe, Nanhe, Yongxing, Yonghe, Shuyi, Gongxue, Shude, Xichuan and Chonglun Village.

== Education ==
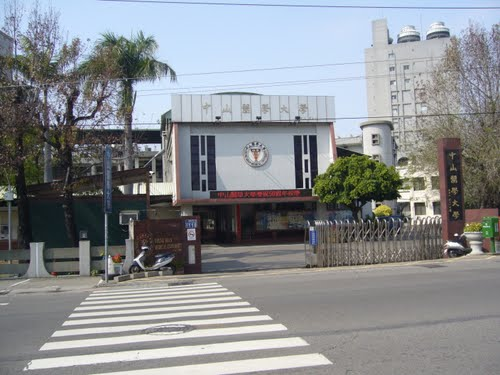
Chung Shan Medical University

- National Chung Hsing University
- Chung Shan Medical University
- YiNing High School (宜寧高中)
- National Taichung Industrial High School (台中高工)
- MingDer Girls' Senior High School (明德女中)
- Chung Lun Junior High School (崇倫國中)
- Sz-Yu Junior High School (四育國中)
- XinYi Elementary School (信義國小)
- Kuo-Kuang Elementary School (國光國小)
- He Ping Elementary School (和平國小)
- Shu Yi Elementary School (樹義國小)

== Tourist attractions ==
- Taichung Cultural and Creative Industries Park

== Transportation ==
=== Railways ===
- TR Daqing Station
- TR Wuchuan Station

=== Taichung Metro ===
- Daqing Station

=== Provincial Highways ===
- Provincial Highway No. 1B(乙)
- Provincial Highway No. 3
- Provincial Highway No. 63

=== Major Roads ===
- Zhongming S. Rd. (忠明南路)
- Wenxin S. Rd. (文心南路)
- Wuquan S. Rd. (五權南路)
- Guoguang Rd. (國光路)
- Fuxing Rd. (復興路)

== See also ==
- Taichung
