= Wenxin =

Wenxin may refer to:

- Wenxin station, a metro station of the Hangzhou Metro
- Wenxin Subdistrict (文新街道), Xihu, Hangzhou, Zhejiang Province, China

== People ==
Real people

- Chen Wenxin (1926–2021), a Chinese biologist
- Cheng Wen-hsing (程文欣; pinyin: Chéng Wénxīn; born 1982), a Taiwanese former badminton player
- Liu Wenxin (born 1967), a former Chinese politician
- Zhu Wenxin (born 1980), left wing position in the 2008 Beijing Olympic Games handball sport

Fictional characters

- Fang Wenxin (方雯馨), a character cast by Xiang Yun in Singapore television drama Start-Up!
- Guan Wenxin (关文馨), a character in Chinese film The Chrysalis
- Luo Wenxin (洛文欣), a character in Singapore television drama The Unbeatables I

== See also ==
- Wenxin Chongde metro station, a metro station of the Taichung Metro
- Wenxin Forest Park metro station, a metro station of the Taichung Metro
- Wenxin Yinghua metro station, a metro station of the Taichung Metro
- Wenxin Zhongqing metro station, a metro station of the Taichung Metro
- Nantun metro station, of which name of second station is Wenxin Wuquan W., a metro station of the Taichung Metro
- Ernie Bot (文心一言, wénxīn yīyán)
- The Literary Mind and the Carving of Dragons (文心雕龍; pinyin: Wén Xīn Diāo Lóng)
