= Zhongqing =

Zhongqing may refer to:

== People ==
- Wei Qing (died 106 BC), courtesy name Zhongqing, Western Han military general
- Liu Zhongqing (born 1985), Chinese aerial skier

== Places ==
- Zhongqing Circuit, an administrative division of China under the Yuan dynasty
- Zhongqing, a village in Beidou, Changhua, Taiwan
- Provincial Highway 10 (Taiwan), known as Zhongqing Road for a portion of the highway in Qingshui, Taichung

== Other ==
- Zhōngqīng (中清), a gauge of guqin strings
- Wenxin Zhongqing metro station, a metro station of the Taichung Metro

== See also ==
- Chung Ching (Chinese: 鍾情; pinyin: Zhōng Qíng), stage name of Zhang Linlin, Hong Kong actress
- Chongqing, a megacity in southwest China
