= Songzhu =

Songzhu may refer to:

- Songzhu (松柱; 1657–1735), Grand Councillor, Minister of Rites, Wenhua Scholar, Royal Tutor
- Songzhu Community (松竹社区), Xinghuacun Subdistrict, Luyang District, Hefei, Anhui Province, China
- Songzhu station, a railway station and metro station located in Beitun District, Taichung, Taiwan
- Songzhu Temple, a folk religion temple
- Songzhu Town (松竹镇), Leizhou, Zhanjiang, Guangdong Province, China
- Songzhu Village (松竹村), Dapi, Yunlin, Taiwan
- Songzhu Village (松竹村), Lucao, Chiayi, Taiwan
- Songzhu Village (松竹村), Shetou, Changhua, Taiwan
- Songzhu Village (松竹村), Shuanggui Subdistrict, Liangping District, Chongqing, China
- Songzhu Village (松竹村), Xingquan, Huaping County, Yunnan Province, China
- Taoist Songzhu (松竹道人), a Chinese mummy
- Songzhu Temple (嵩祝寺), a Gelugpa monastery of Tibetan Buddhism in Songzhuyuan, Dongcheng District, Beijing
- "Monarch of Song", or Suju (宋主 Songzhu) in the history of the House of Zhao

== See also ==
- 松竹 (disambiguation)
