= Taiyuan railway station (Taiwan) =

Railway station located in Taichung, Taiwan

Coordinates: 24°10′00.3″N 120°42′01.3″E

Taiyuan 太原
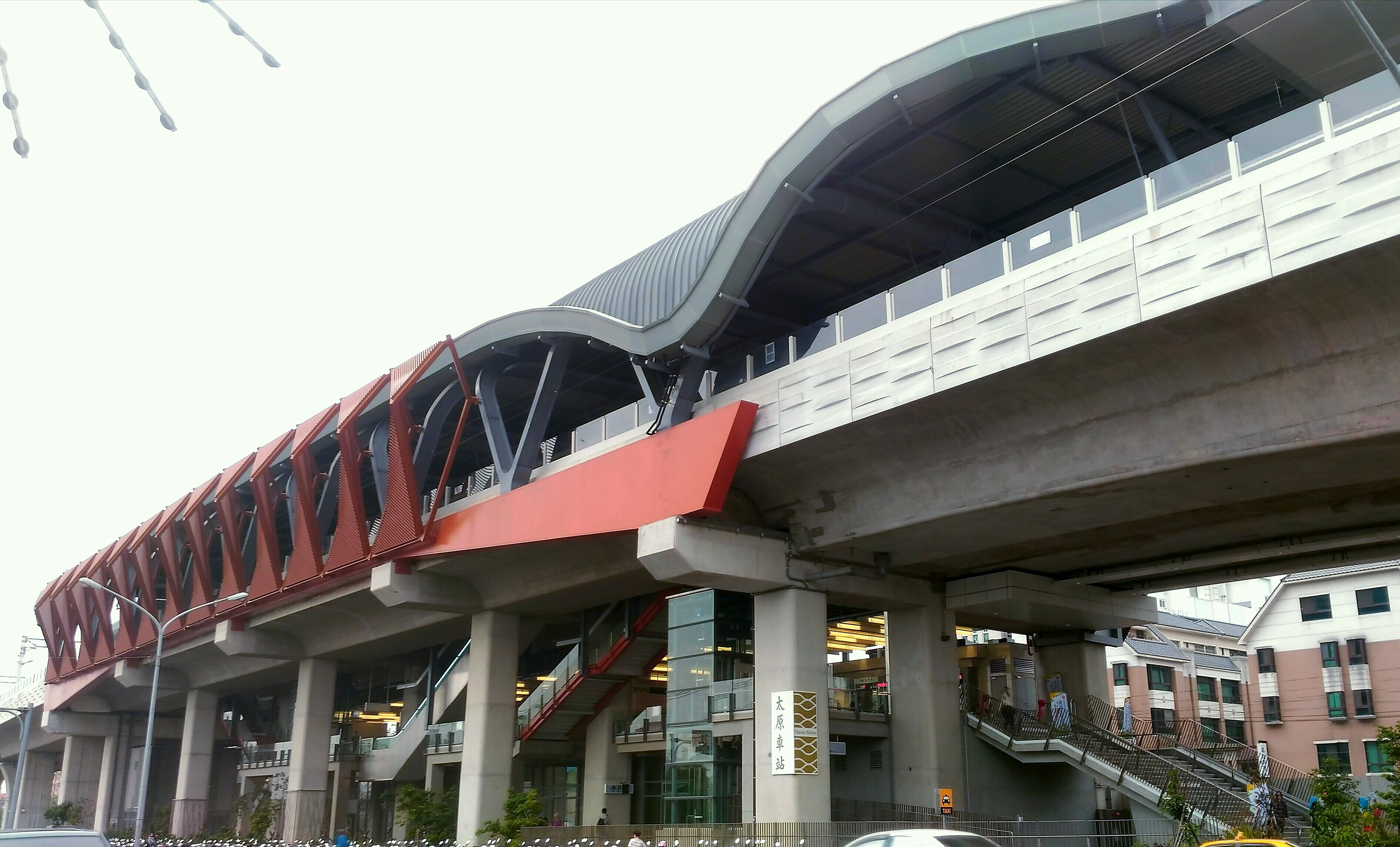

General information
- Location: Beitun, Taichung; Taiwan
- Operated by: Taiwan Railway Corporation
- Line: Western Trunk line
- Platforms: 2 side platforms

Construction
- Structure type: Elevated

Other information
- Classification: 簡易站 (Taiwan Railways Administration level)

History
- Opening: 22 November 2002
- Rebuilt: 16 October 2016

Services
Preceding station	Taiwan Railway	Following station
Songzhu towards Keelung	Western Trunk line	Jingwu towards Kaohsiung
Location

Taiyuan (Chinese: 太原車站; pinyin: Tàiyuán Chēzhàn) is an elevated railway station on the Taiwan Railway Taichung line located in Beitun District, Taichung, Taiwan.

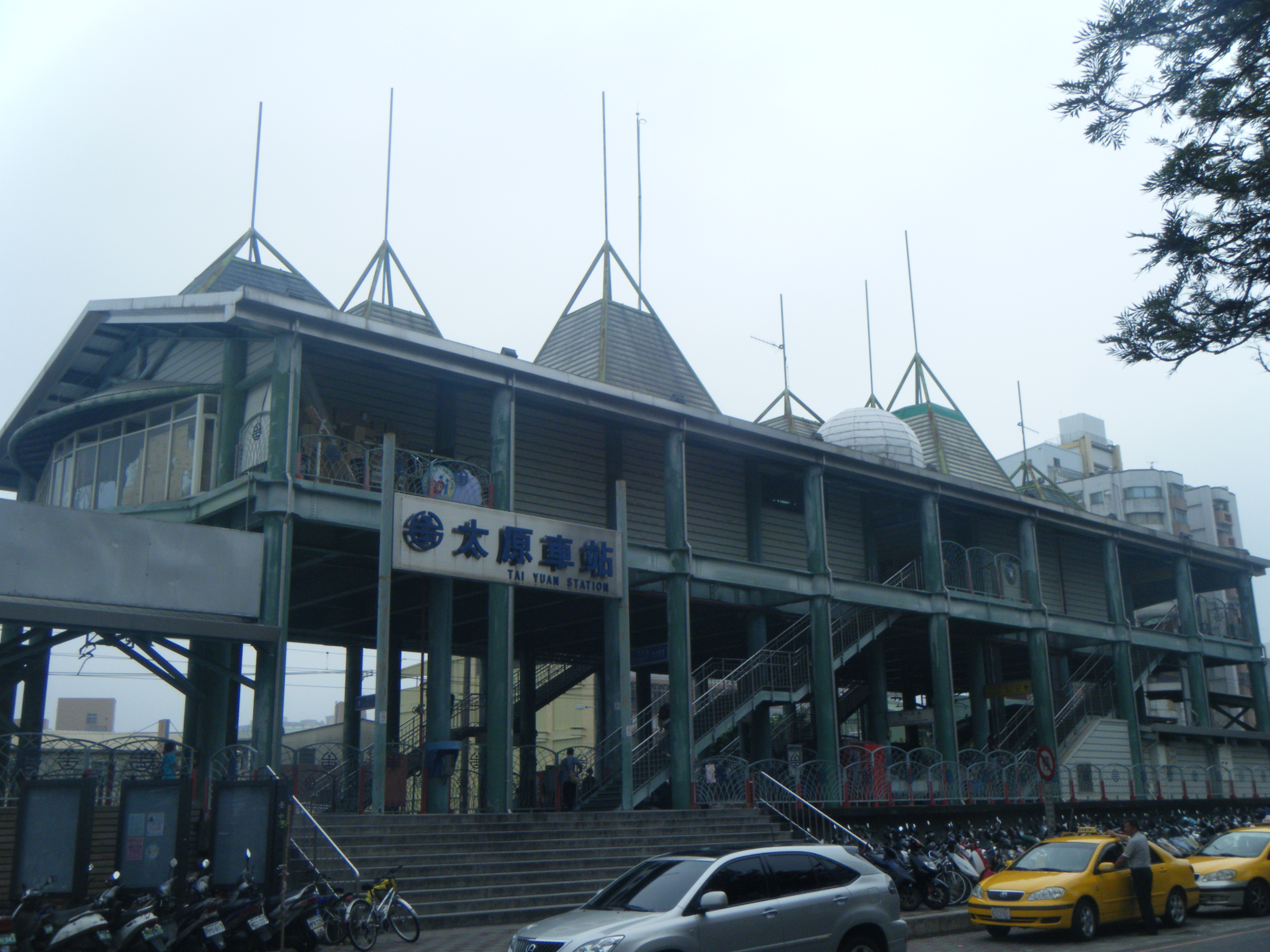
The old Taiyuan station

The station was rebuilt with an elevated platform in 2016.

== Platform layout ==
1	■ West Coast line (southbound)	Toward Taichung, Tainan, Kaohsiung, Pingtung
2	■ West Coast line (northbound)	Toward Fengyuan, Taipei, Keelung

== Service ==
The TRA once operated a restaurant on the second floor at old Taiyuan station, and Giant Bicycles also operated a store. Both are now closed prior to being replaced by the elevated station.

== Around the station ==
- Central Taiwan University of Science and Technology
- Taichung Military Kindred Village Museum
- Yide Mansion

== See also ==
- List of railway stations in Taiwan
