= WHSH =

WHSH may refer to:

- WHSH-LP, a defunct television station (channel 36) formerly licensed to Rochester, New York, United States
- WUNI, a television station (channel 27 digital/66 PSIP) licensed to Marlborough, Massachusetts, United States, which used the call sign WHSH from 1987 to 1992 and WHSH-TV from 1992 to 2000
- WPYX, a radio station (106.5 FM) licensed to Albany, New York, United States, which used the call sign WHSH from 1973 to 1980
- National Wen-Hua Senior High School, located in Taichung City, Taiwan
