= 松竹 =

松竹, meaning “pine, bamboo”, may refer to:

- Shochiku, a Japanese entertainment company
- Songjuk (송죽; 松竹), an administrative division in Jangan District, Suwon Gyeonggi, South Korea
- Songzhu (disambiguation), the Chinese transliteration
