= Wenhua Senior High School metro station =

Metro station in Taichung, Taiwan

Wenhua Senior High School 108 文華高中
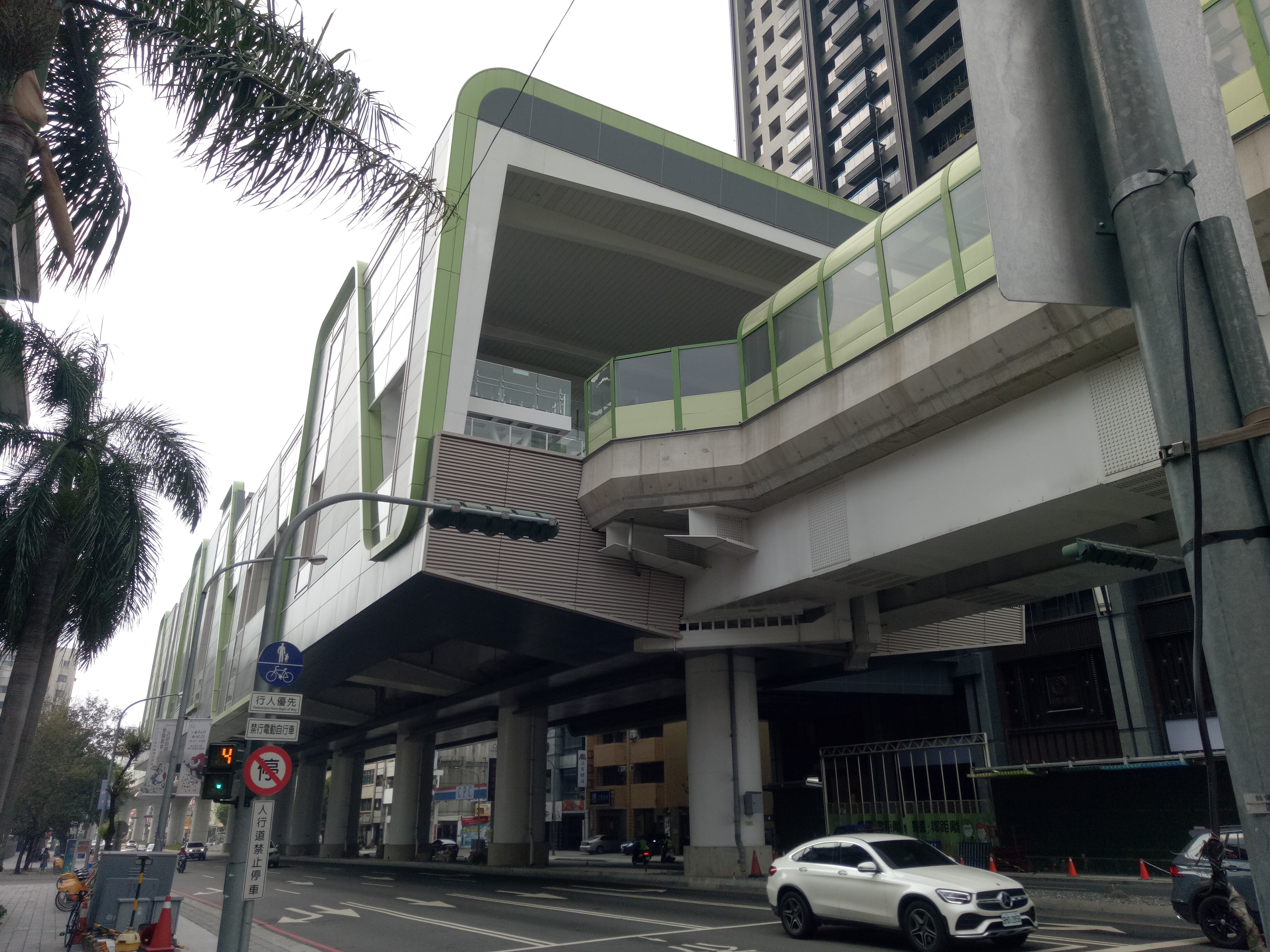

General information
- Location: Xitun, Taichung; Taiwan
- Coordinates: 24°10′17.000″N 120°39′38.002″E
- Operated by: Taichung MRT
- Line: Green line
- Platforms: 2 side platforms

Construction
- Structure type: Elevated

Other information
- Station code: 108

History
- Opened: 25 April 2021

Services
Preceding station	Taichung MRT	Following station
Wenxin Yinghua towards HSR Taichung Station	Green line	Wenxin Zhongqing towards Beitun Main
Location

Wenhua Senior High School metro station
- Chinese: 文華高中站
Transcriptions
Standard Mandarin
- Hanyu Pinyin: Wénhuá Gāozhōng Zhàn
- Bopomofo: ㄨㄣˊ ㄏㄨㄚˊ ㄍㄠ ㄓㄨㄥ ㄓㄢˋ
- Tongyong Pinyin: Wúnhuá Gaojhong Jhàn

Wenhua Senior High School is a metro station on the Green line operated by Taichung MRT in Xitun District, Taichung, Taiwan.

National Wen-Hua Senior High School, the station's namesake, is located nearby. A mixed-use building is being constructed in conjunction to the north of the station and will be connected by a bridge.

== Station layout ==
4F	Crossover level	Platforms-connecting overpass
3F
3F	Side platform, doors will open on the right
3F	Track 1	Green line: towards HSR Taichung Station (Wenxin Yinghua)
3F	Track 2	Green line: towards Beitun Main (Wenxin Zhongqing)
3F	Side platform, doors will open on the right
3F	Concourse
3F	Concourse	Lobby, information desk, automatic ticket dispensing machines, one-way faregates
2F	Mezzanine	Transitlink floor for stairs and escalators
1F	Street level	Exit/entrance
