= Taichung Military Kindred Village Museum =

Museum in Beitun, Taichung, Taiwan

- 臺中市眷村文物館
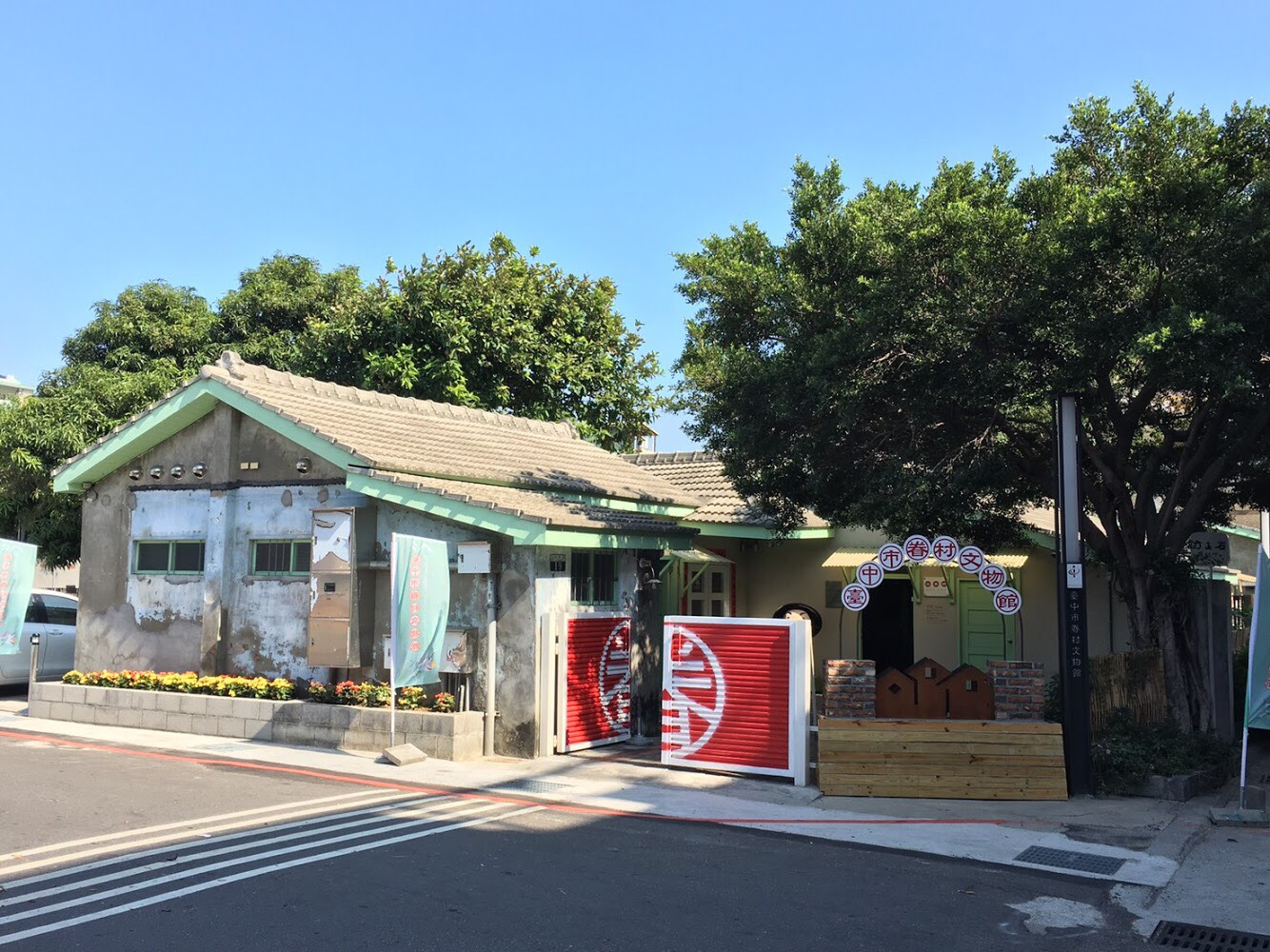
- Established: November 2014
- Location: Beitun, Taichung, Taiwan
- Coordinates: 24°09′40.9″N 120°41′42.6″E
- Type: museum
- Public transit access: Taiyuan Station

The Taichung Military Kindred Village Museum (traditional Chinese: 臺中市眷村文物館; simplified Chinese: 台中市眷村文物馆; pinyin: Táizhōng Shì Juàn Cūn Wénwù Guǎn) is a museum in Beitun District, Taichung, Taiwan.

== History ==
The museum building was originally part of the Beitun New Village, which was one of 134 military kindred villages in the city accommodating officers from the Republic of China Air Force rank major and above, including their families. Since the 2000s, there had been more and more families moving out from the area. The village was then renovated to preserve some of the iconic landmarks. One of the house was then turned into the Taichung Military Kindred Village Museum. The construction of the museum was completed in mid November 2014. Since August 2017, the museum has been run by Yuguo Cultural and Creative Company.

== Architecture ==
The museum space spans over an area of 660 m^{2}.

== Transportation ==
The museum is accessible within walking distance southwest of Taiyuan Station of Taiwan Railway.

== See also ==
- List of museums in Taiwan
