= Beitun District =

District in Taichung, Taiwan

Coordinates: 24°10′49.54″N 120°44′47.81″E

Beitun 北屯區
- District
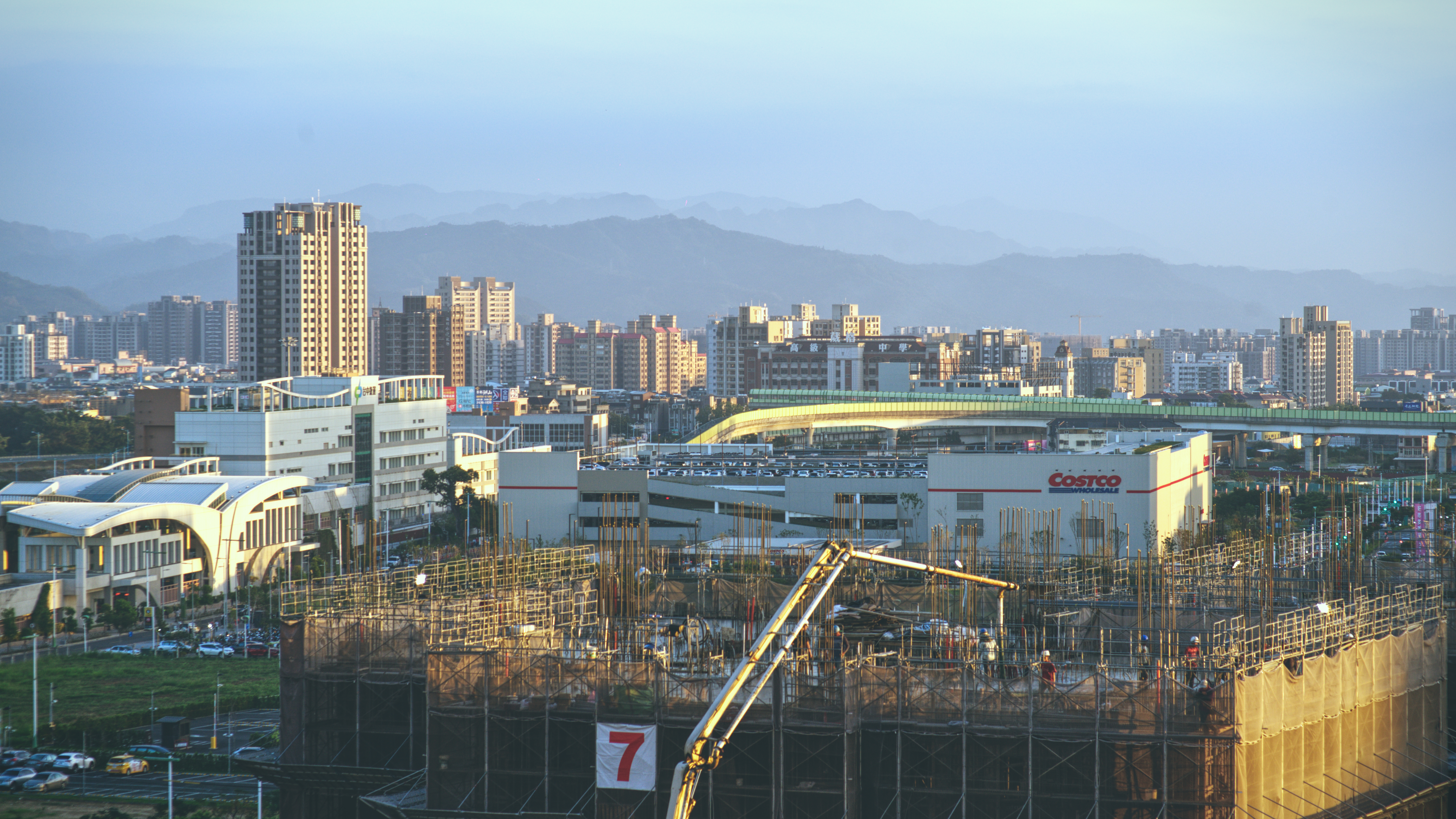

- Beitun District in Taichung City
- Location: Taichung, Taiwan

Area
  - Total: 63 km^{2} (24 sq mi)

Population (December 2024)
  - Total: 310,965
  - Density: 4,900/km^{2} (13,000/sq mi)
- Website: www.beitun.taichung.gov.tw (in Chinese)

Beitun District (Chinese: 北屯區; pinyin: Běitún Qū; Wade–Giles: Pei^{3}-t'un^{2} Ch'ü^{1}; lit. 'northern settlement') is a district in Taichung, Taiwan. Located in the northern part of the city, it is a half mountainous, half urban area. Though Beitun District used to be considered part of the countryside, the new Taiyuan Station has urbanized it considerably. The highest point of Taichung City is located in Beitun, Touke Mountain (859 m).

== History ==
The district used to be part of Taichung provincial city before the merger with Taichung County to form Taichung special municipality on 25 December 2010.

== Administrative divisions ==
Beitun District is divided into 42 Li (里, or villages):

- Beixing Li (北興里)
- Beitun Li (北屯里)
- Sankuan Li (三光里)
- Pingtian Li (平田里)
- Pinghe Li (平和里)
- Ping-an Li (平安里)
- Pingde Li (平德里)
- Pingsun Li (平順里)
- Tongkuang Li (東光里)
- Chiushen Li (舊社里)
- Shueijing Li (水景里)
- Jungong Li (軍功里)
- Heping Li (和平里)
- Mingzheng Li (民政里)
- Jinzi Li (廍子里)
- Dacheng Li (大坑里)
- Mingde Li (民德里)
- Songzhu Li (松竹里)
- Song-an Li (松安里)
- Songjia Li (松茂里)
- Renhe Li (仁和里)
- Renmei Li (仁美里)
- Siming Li (四民里)
- Houzhuang Li (后庄里)
- Tongrong Li (同榮里)
- Ren-ai Li (仁愛里)
- Shueinan Li (水湳里)
- Chengping Li (陳平里)
- Dade Li (大德里)
- Xingping Li (新平里)
- Dongshan Li (東山里)
- Songyong Li (松勇里)
- Songqiang Li (松強里)
- Beijing Li (北京里)
- Pingxing Li (平心里)
- Pingfu Li (平福里)
- Songhe Li (松和里)
- Pingyang Li (平陽里)
- Pingchang Li (平昌里)
- Pingxing Li (平興里)
- Sanhe Li (三和里)
- Zhongping Li (忠平里)

== Education ==
- Central Taiwan University of Science and Technology
- Morrison Academy

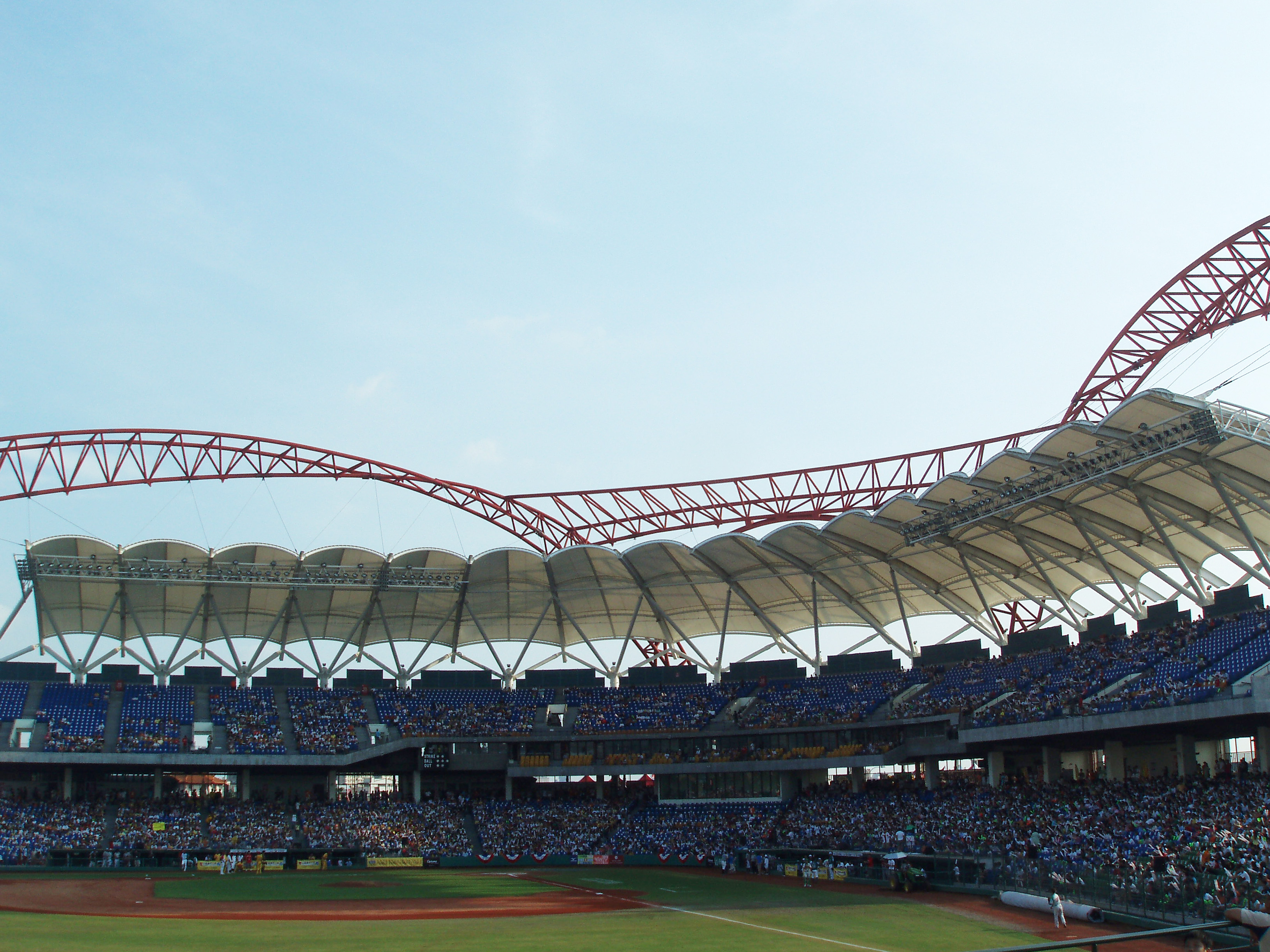
Taichung Intercontinental Baseball Stadium

== Spots ==
- Taichung Intercontinental Baseball Stadium

== Tourist attractions ==
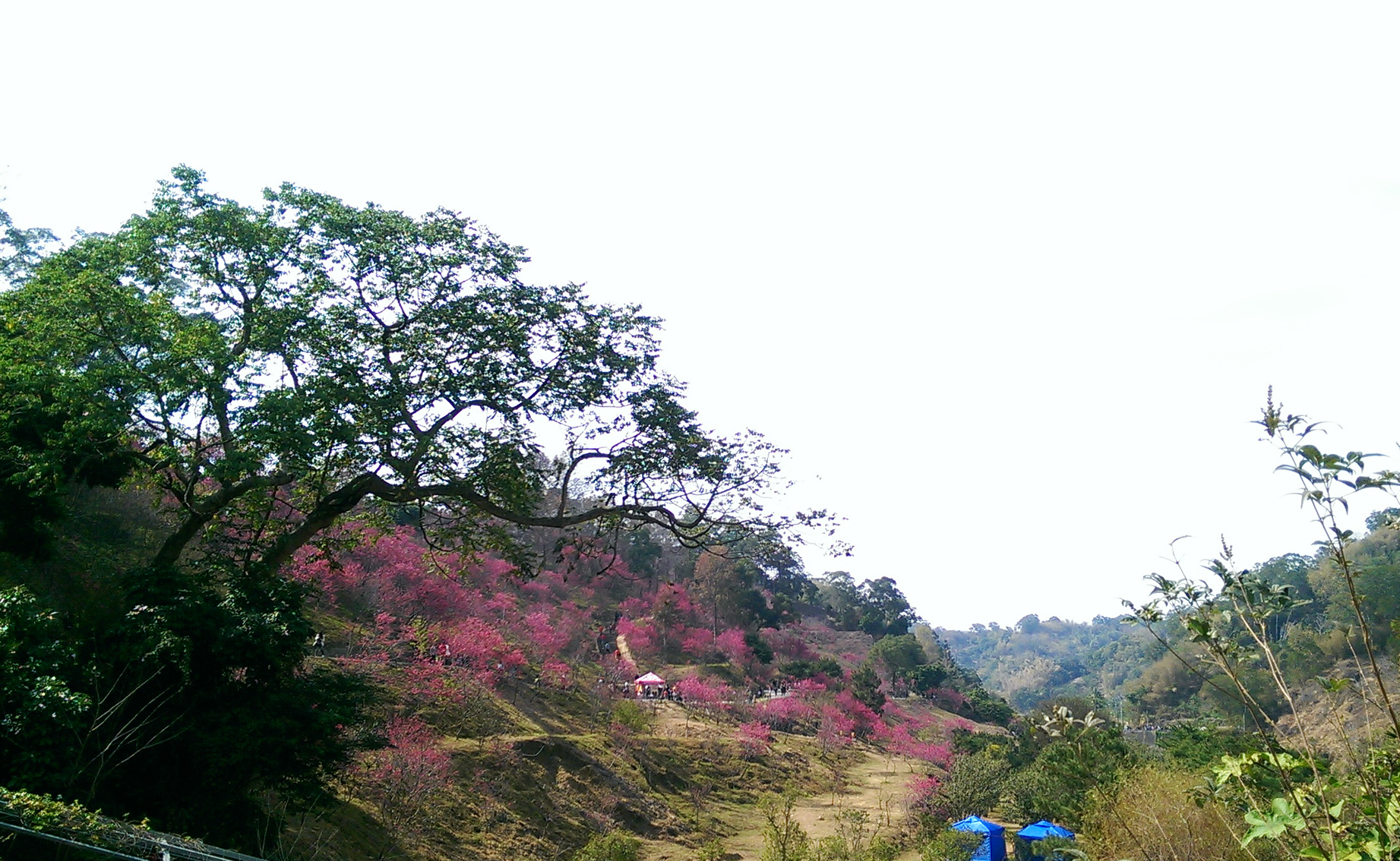
Dakeng

- Beitun Wenchang Temple
- Dakeng hiking and biking trails
- Songzhu Temple
- Taichung Folklore Park
- Taichung Military Kindred Village Museum
- Yide Mansion

== Transportation ==
=== Railway ===
- Songzhu railway station
- Taiyuan railway station

=== Taichung Metro ===
- Beitun Main metro station
- Jiushe metro station
- Songzhu station
- Sihwei Elementary School metro station
- Wenxin Chongde metro station

=== Roads ===
- Provincial Highway No. 1A
- Provincial Highway No. 3
- Provincial Highway No. 74

== Notable natives ==
- Dewi Chien, singer
- Joe Cheng, model, actor and singer

== See also ==
- Taichung
