= Jingwu railway station =

Railway station in Taichung, Taiwan

Jingwu 精武
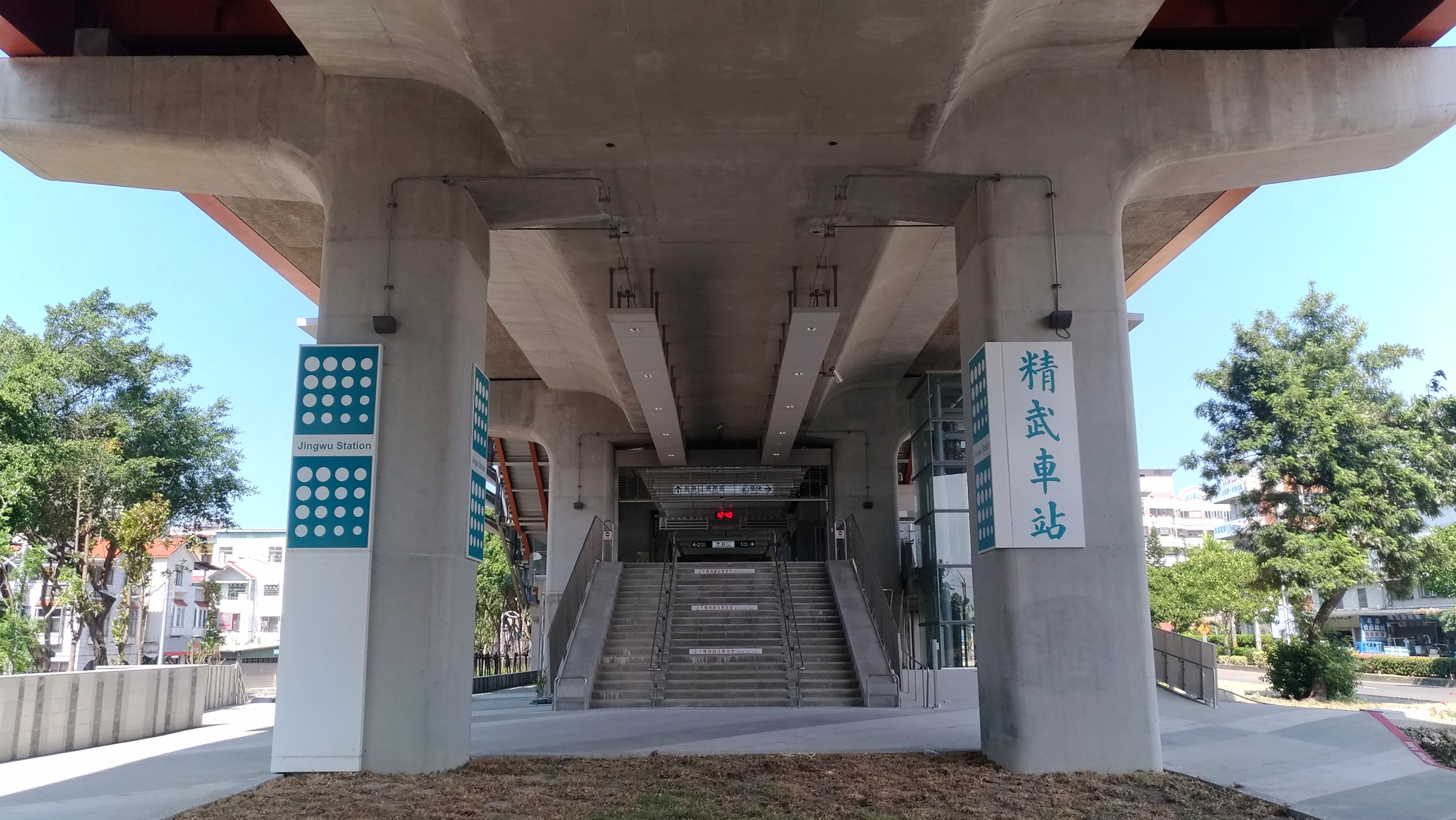

Chinese name
- Traditional Chinese: 精武
Transcriptions
Standard Mandarin
- Hanyu Pinyin: Jīngwǔ
- Bopomofo: ㄐㄧㄥ ㄨˇ

General information
- Location: East District, Taichung; Taiwan
- Coordinates: 24°08′58.6″N 120°41′51.8″E
- System: Taiwan Railway railway station
- Line: Western Trunk line
- Distance: 191.2 km to Keelung
- Connections: Local bus

Construction
- Structure type: Elevated

History
- Opened: 2018-10-28

Passengers
- 2018: TBA
- Rank: TBA

Services
Preceding station	Taiwan Railway	Following station
Taiyuan towards Keelung	Western Trunk line	Taichung towards Kaohsiung
Location
- Location within Taiwan

Jingwu (Chinese: 精武; pinyin: Jīngwǔ) is a railway station in Taichung, Taiwan served by the Taiwan Railway. It opened in October 2018 following a delay from March 2017.

== Location ==
Jingwu Station is located in the East District of Taichung City, at the intersection of Nanjing E Road and Fugui Road. It is close to the Taichung Confucius Temple, Taichung Stadium, and Taichung Baseball Field.

== See also ==
- List of railway stations in Taiwan
