= Taichung Folklore Park =

Cultural center in Beitun, Taichung, Taiwan

- 臺中民俗公園
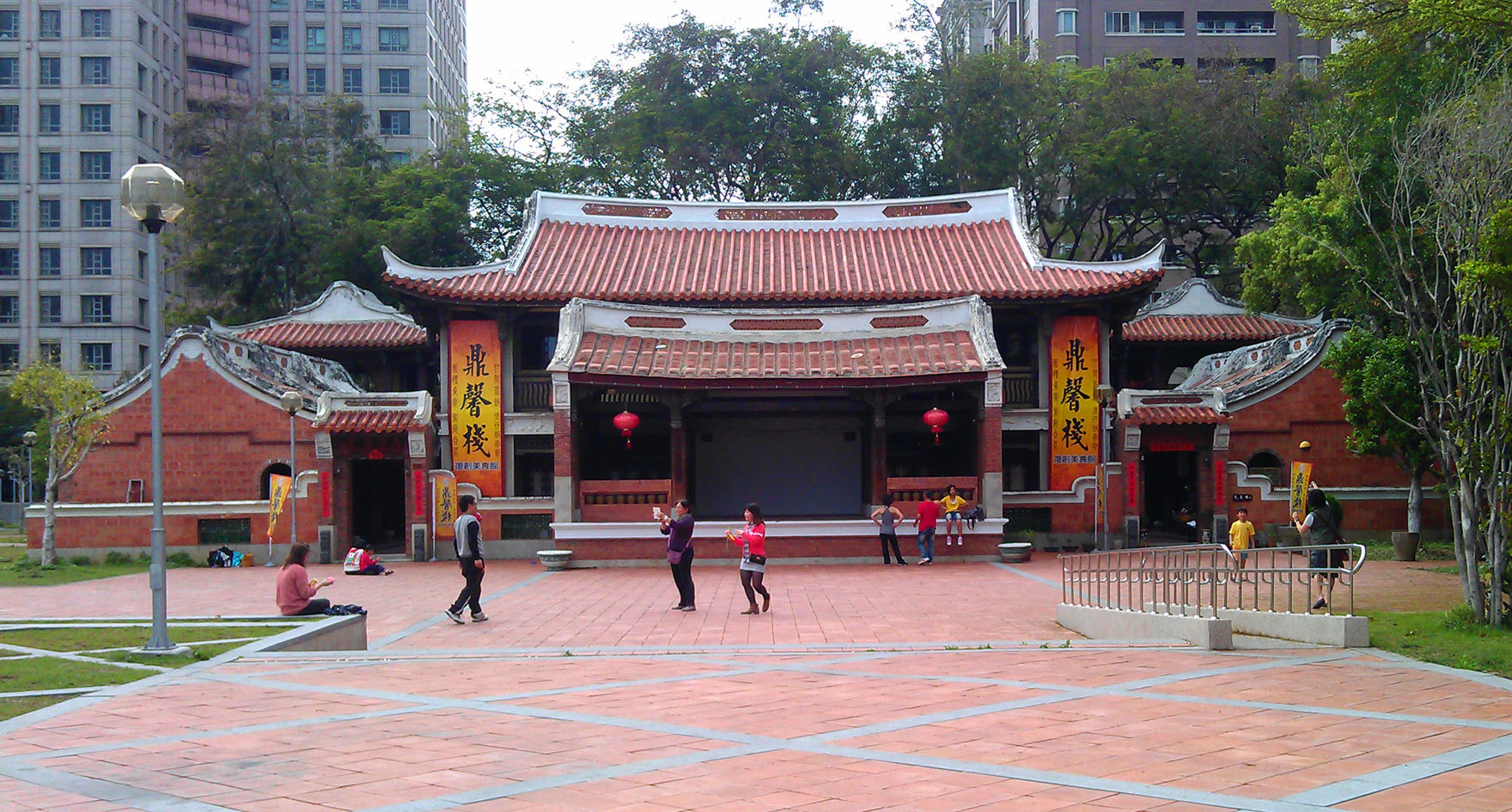
- Interactive map of the Taichung Folklore Park area

General information
- Type: cultural center
- Location: Beitun, Taichung, Taiwan
- Coordinates: 24°10′30.4″N 120°41′13.4″E
- Construction started: 1984
- Completed: March 1990
- Opened: November 1995

Technical details
- Floor area: 1.6 hectares

The Taichung Folklore Park (traditional Chinese: 臺中民俗公園; simplified Chinese: 台中民俗公园; pinyin: Táizhōng Mínsú Gōngyuán) is a cultural center in Beitun District, Taichung, Taiwan.

== History ==
The construction of the park started in 1984 by Taichung City Council and opened in March 1990.

== Architecture ==
The park spans over an area of 1.6 hectares. It consists of Folklore Hall, Folklore and Cultural Heritage Hall and Folk Arts Hall.

== Exhibitions ==
The park exhibits various folk heritage of people from the coastal area of Fujian at the end of Qing Dynasty.

== Transportation ==
The park is accessible by bus from Taichung Station of Taiwan Railway.

== See also ==
- List of tourist attractions in Taiwan
