= Yide Mansion =

Former residence in Beitun, Taichung, Taiwan

- 林懋陽故居
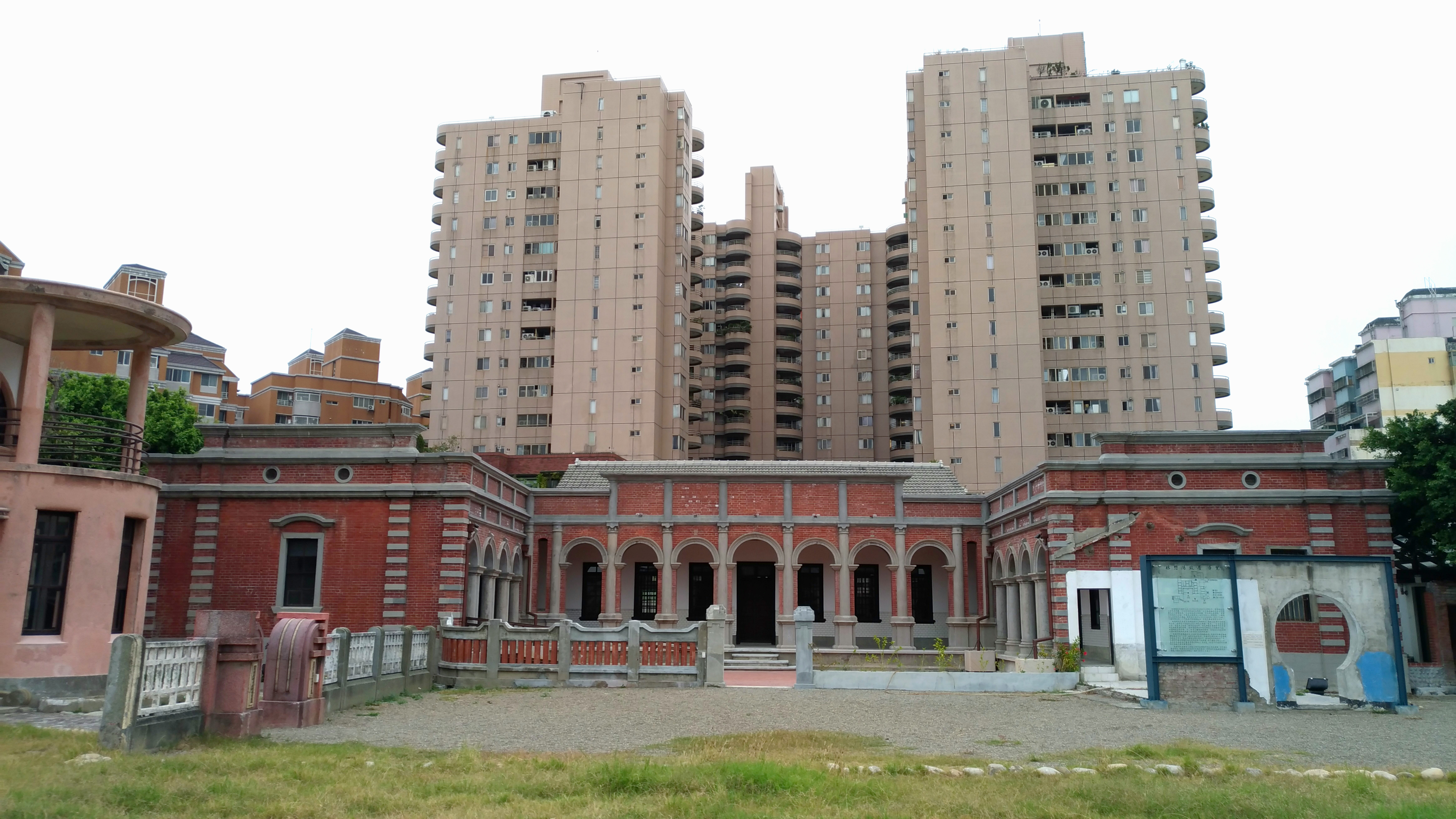
- Interactive map of the Yide Mansion area

General information
- Type: former residence
- Location: Beitun, Taichung, Taiwan
- Coordinates: 24°9′57.9″N 120°41′34.7″E
- Completed: 1930
- Renovation cost: NT$45 million

The Yide Mansion (traditional Chinese: 林懋陽故居; simplified Chinese: 林懋阳故居; pinyin: Lín Màoyáng Gùjū) is a former residence in Beitun District, Taichung, Taiwan.

== History ==
In 1925, Lin Mao-yang moved to the current plot of land in which the mansion stands. In 1930, he constructed the mansion during his career peak. In 1950, the mansion was sold to the Joint Logistics Headquarters. The company then used the mansion as the residence for high rank officers in 1954. In 2007, the mansion was declared historical building by Taichung City Government. Since then, the mansion underwent renovation work with a cost of NT$45 million. Green landscaping works were done since 2 October 2013 until 28 January 2014. The renovation work was completed in April 2015.

== Architecture ==
The green landscaping area of the mansion is divided into five areas, which are Tree-Lined Resting Zone, Lawn Activity Zone, Children's Playground Zone, Recreation Zone with Texture of Military Dependents' Village and Eco-Forest Zone.

== Transportation ==
The building is accessible within walking distance west of Taiyuan Station of Taiwan Railway.

== See also ==
- List of tourist attractions in Taiwan
