= Songzhu station =

Railway and metro station in Beitun, Taichung, Taiwan

Coordinates: 24°10′48.5″N 120°42′06.7″E

Songzhu 松竹
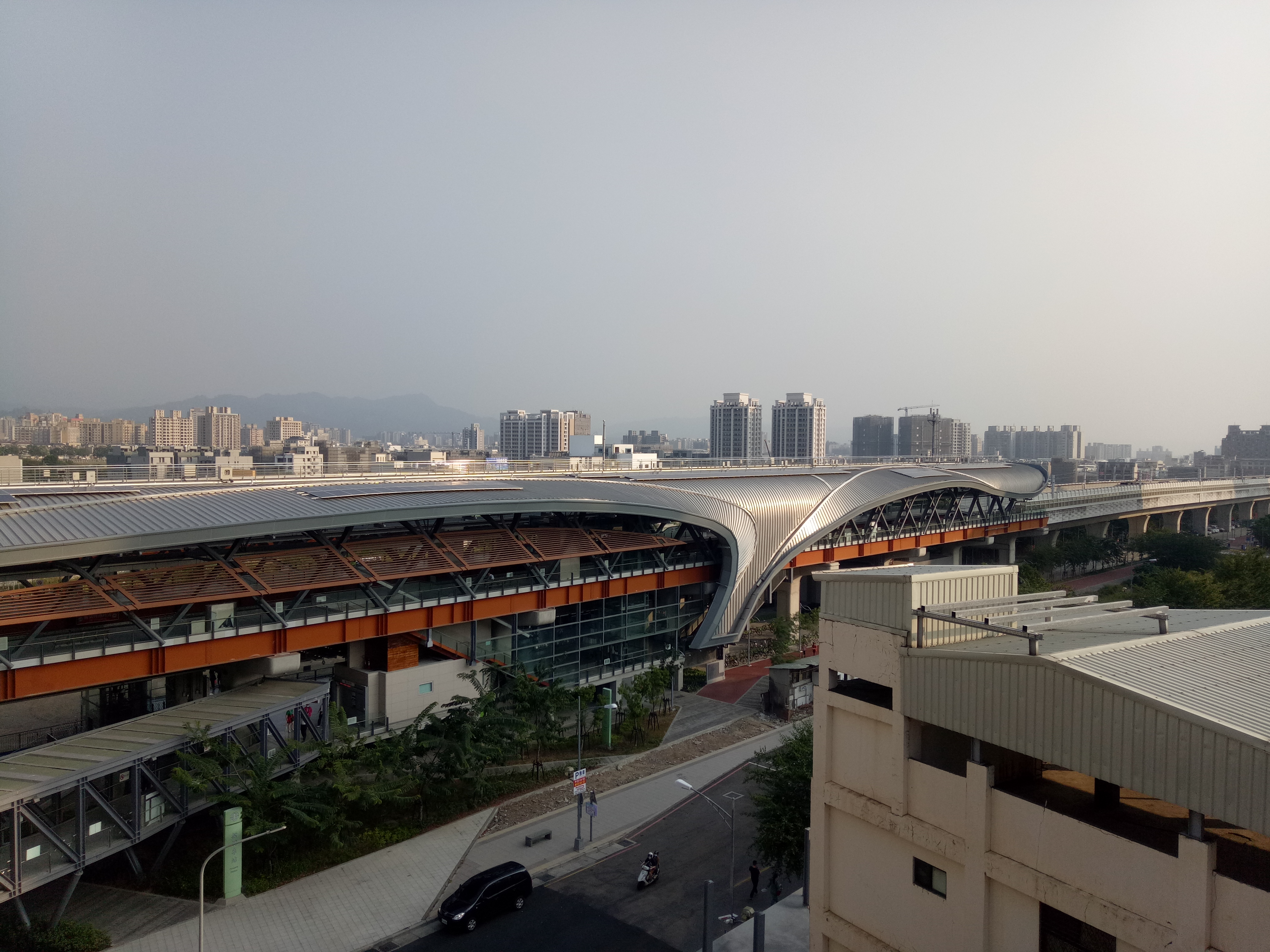

General information
- Location: Beitun, Taichung; Taiwan
- Operated by: Taiwan Railway
- Line: Western Trunk line
- Platforms: 2 side platforms

Construction
- Structure type: Elevated

Other information
- Classification: 簡易站 (Taiwan Railways Administration level)

History
- Opening: October 28, 2018

Services
Preceding station	Taiwan Railway	Following station
Toujiacuo towards Keelung	Western Trunk line	Taiyuan towards Kaohsiung
Location

Songzhu 104 松竹
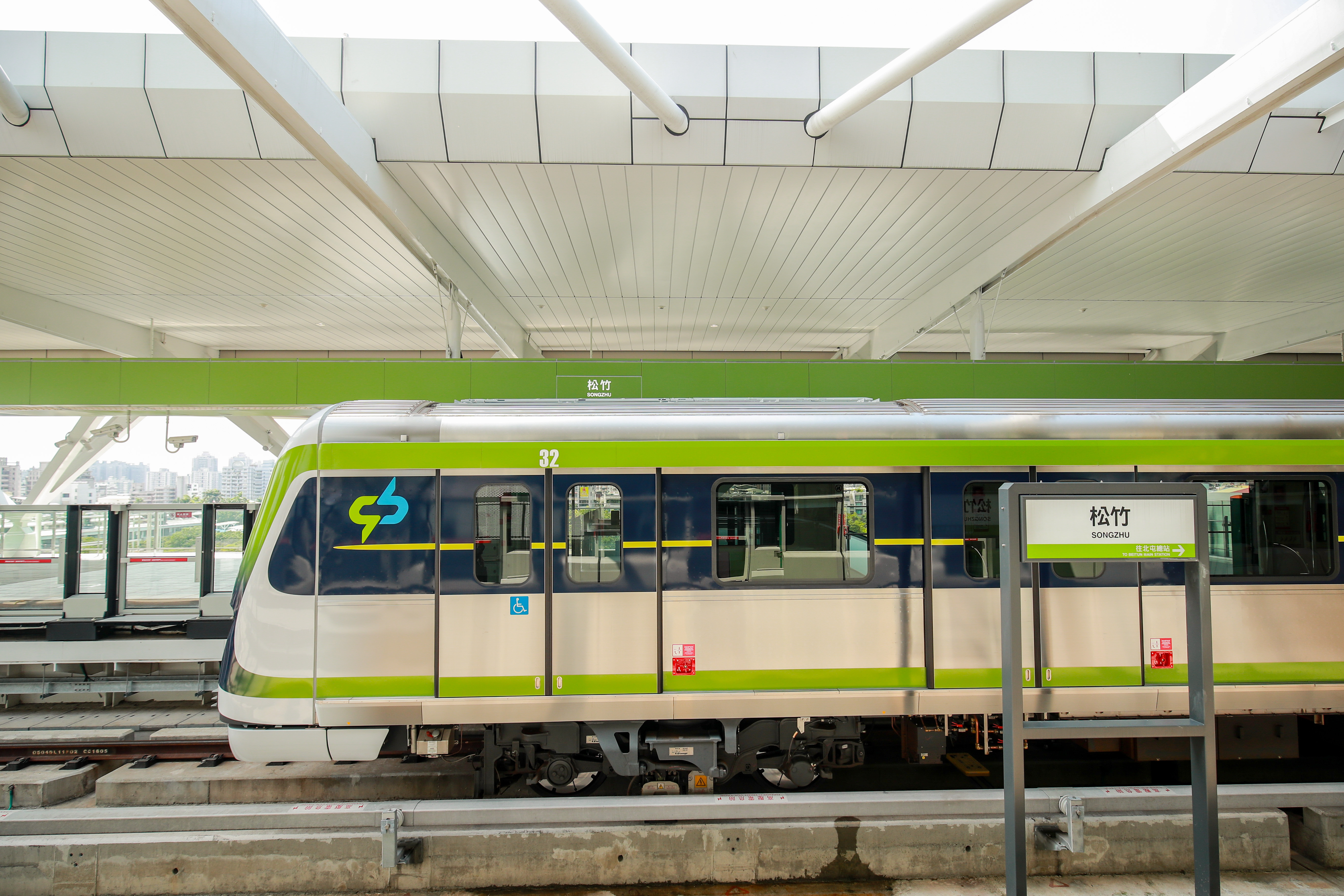

General information
- Operated by: Taichung MRT
- Line: Green line
- Platforms: 2 side platforms

Construction
- Structure type: Elevated

Other information
- Station code: 104

History
- Opened: 25 April 2021

Services
Preceding station	Taichung MRT	Following station
Sihwei Elementary School towards HSR Taichung Station	Green line	Jiushe towards Beitun Main
Location

Songzhu (Chinese: 松竹車站; pinyin: Sōngzhú Chēzhàn) is a railway station and metro station located in Beitun District, Taichung, Taiwan. It is served by the Taiwan Railway Taichung line and the Green line operated by Taichung MRT, connected by an out-of-station transfer.

== Around the station ==
- Jiushe Park
- Nanxing Park
- Songzhu Plaza
- Save & Safe Beitun Store

== See also ==
- List of railway stations in Taiwan
