= Central Taiwan University of Science and Technology =

Private university in Beitun, Taichung, Taiwan

- 中臺科技大學
- Motto: 忠、信、篤、敬(Pe̍h-ōe-jī: Tiong, sìn, tok, kèng)
- Motto in English: Loyalty, trust, sincerity, and respect
- Type: private university
- Established: 1966 (as Chungtai Junior College); 1 August 2005 (as CTUST)
- Dean: Chen Chin-hsing
- Location: Beitun, Taichung, Taiwan; 24.174006°N 120.735356°E
- Website: ctust.edu.tw

Central Taiwan University of Science and Technology
- Traditional Chinese: 中臺科技大學
- Simplified Chinese: 中台科技大学
Transcriptions
Standard Mandarin
- Hanyu Pinyin: Zhōngtái Kējì Dàxué
Southern Min
- Hokkien POJ: Tiong-tâi Kho-ki Tāi-ha̍k

The Central Taiwan University of Science and Technology (CTUST; Chinese: 中臺科技大學; Pe̍h-ōe-jī: Tiong-tâi Kho-ki Tāi-ha̍k) is a private university in Beitun, Taichung, Taiwan.

== History ==
CTUST was originally established as Chungtai Junior College in 1966. On 1 July 1998, the college was upgraded to Medical Technology College. On 1 August 2005, the college was upgraded to Central Taiwan University of Science and Technology.

== Faculties ==
The university consists of:

- College of health sciences
- College of nursing
- College of humanities and management

== See also ==
- List of universities in Taiwan
