= Guqin strings =

The strings of the guqin Chinese zither are either made of silk, nylon or metal-nylon.

== Overview ==
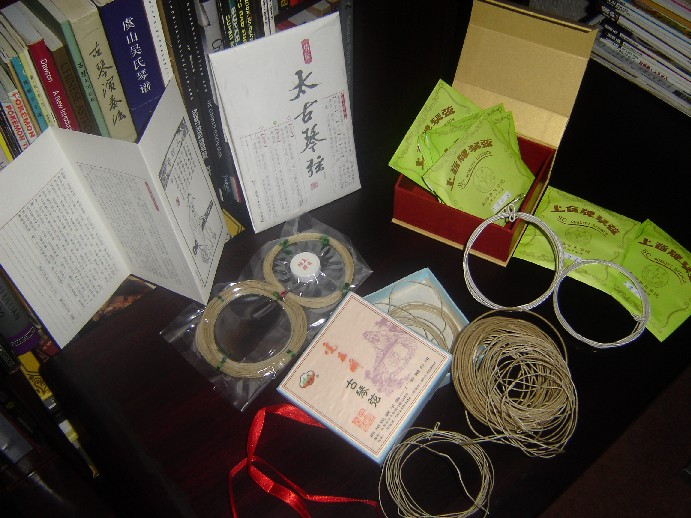
A selection of different qin strings. Top to bottom: 〖太古琴絃〗 Taigu Silk Qin Strings [中清 zhongqing gauge] with a container of 'string gum' 「絃膠」, 〖上音牌琴弦〗 Shangyin Shanghai Conservatorie Quality Qin Strings (metal-nylon), 〖虎丘古琴絃〗 Huqiu Silk Strings

Until the modern era, the guqin's strings were always made of various thicknesses of twisted silk 『絲/丝』, but since then most players use modern nylon-flatwound steel strings 『鋼絲/钢丝』. This was partly due to the scarcity of high quality silk strings and partly due to the newer strings' greater durability and louder tone.

=== Silk strings ===
Silk strings are made by gathering a prescribed number of strands of silk thread, then twisting them tightly together. The twisted cord of strings is then wrapped around a frame and immersed in a vat of liquid composed of a special mixture of natural glue (ingredients include Bletilla striata and isinglass) that binds the strands together. The strings is taken out and left to dry, before being cut into the appropriate length. The top thicker strings (i.e. strings one to four) are further wrapped in a thin silk thread, coiled around the core to make it smoother. According to ancient manuals, there are three distinctive gauges of thickness that one can make the strings. The first is taigu 〖太古〗 [Great Antiquity] which is the standard gauge, the zhongqing 〖中清〗 [Middle Clarity] is thinner, whilst the jiazhong 〖加重〗 [Added Thickness] is thicker. According to the Yugu Zhai Qinpu, zhongqing is the best. However, these three gauges have practical relevance as thinner strings sound better on thicker instruments and vice versa, compensating for the thickness of the instrument and thus the potential tone and volume. The Taigu brand of silk strings indicate that the zhongqing gauge is suitable for longer qins, made of Chinese fir and/or have a thicker top board whilst the jiazhong gauge is suitable for shorter qins, made of paulownia and/or have a thinner top board (the taigu gauge being suitable for all).

Recently in China, production of very good quality silk strings has resumed and more players are beginning to use them. The American qin player and scholar John Thompson advocates for the use of both silk and nylon-wrapped metal strings for different styles of qin music, much like the guitar exists in both classical (nylon-string) and steel-string forms. Playing silk strings is different from playing metal-nylon one, as you need to pluck much more gently in order to avoid buzzing and the string slapping on the surface. Thus, silk strings are slightly more difficult to play.

=== Metal-nylon strings ===
Metal-nylon strings (that is, a steel core wound with nylon) were developed in China in the 1950s as a temporary measure to solve the shortage crisis of silk string production and supplies. Eventually, this type of string replaced silk altogether as they are easier and quicker to produce as well as being far easier to play as the strings are smooth to slide on. The strings were very strong and could retain their tuning unlike silk and also they were louder and more stable. A set could last many years and not break.

Some drawbacks of metal-nylon include: the strings were originally too smooth and had to be lessened to regain some of the sliding string sounds that were felt to be distinctive of qin music; for traditionalists the strings had a harsh metallic sound which was considered inelegant; the strings could eventually wear the lacquer out requiring the qin surface to be repaired more often.

=== Nylon-composite strings ===
Around 2007, a new set of strings were produced made of mostly a nylon core coiled with nylon like the metal-nylon strings, possibly in imitation of Western catgut strings. The sound is similar to the metal-nylon strings but without the metallic tone to them (one of the main reasons why traditionalists do not like the metal-nylon strings). The nylon strings are able to be turned to standard pitch without breaking and can sustain their tuning whatever the climate unlike silk.

The nylon-composite strings have various names such as bingxian (冰弦; "ice strings") or fuhexian (復合弦; "composite strings"). One of the main advertising points of these strings is that they are said to sound very close to the silk strings made prior to the 1950s when silk string production ceased for a while. They were tested on Zeng Chengwei qins and have the backing of Li Xiangting.

=== Hybrid strings ===
In 2016, the Japanese string maker, Marusan Hashimoto, produced what they call hybrid strings for qin. They are made like traditional silk strings but with a Tetron twisted core and for the four thicker strings having a nylon wrapping. Their main selling point is that they can be tuned to standard pitch without breaking and are more stable. Other than that, they are very similar to silk strings, especially in the sound being the closest compared to the other synthetic strings.

== Properties of the strings ==
Although most contemporary players use nylon-wrapped metal strings, some argue that nylon-wrapped metal strings cannot replace silk strings for their refinement of tone. Further, it is the case that nylon-wrapped metal strings can cause damage to the wood of old qins. Many traditionalists feel that the sound of the fingers of the left hand sliding on the strings to be a distinctive feature of qin music. The modern nylon-wrapped metal strings were very smooth in the past, but are now slightly modified in order to capture these sliding sounds.

Although silk strings tend to break more often than metal nylon ones, they are stronger than one may be led to think. Silk is very flexible, and can be strung to high tensions and tuned up to the standard pitch that was proposed by mainland China (5th string at A) without breaking. Also, although they may be more likely to break at higher tension, they are hardly discardable once a string has broken. Silk strings tend to be very long (more than 2 metres) and break at the point where it rubs on the bridge. One simply ties another butterfly knot at the broken end, cut the frayed bit, then re-string. In this way, the string can be re-used up to ten times for the thinner strings (three or four times for thicker ones), and every set includes an extra seventh (most likely to break) and probably a fourth (next most likely to break). Because silk strings break easily, there are very few that survive from the past dynasties.

== Stringing the instrument ==
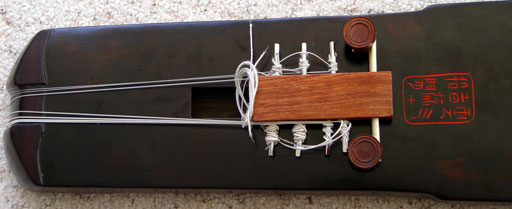
The new tuning device which clips onto the goose-feet and is strung using a tuning wrench on the zither-pins. The pins are adjusted to more-or-less the required pitch, whilst the tuning pegs on the head are used to tune it more finely. Image courtesy of Chinese Culture Net

Traditionally, the strings were wrapped around the goose feet 『雁足』, but there has been a device that has been invented, which is a block of wood attached to the goose feet, with pins similar to those used to tune the guzheng protruding out at the sides, so one can string and tune the qin using a tuning wrench. This is good for those who lack the physical strength to pull and add tension to the strings when wrapping the ends to the goose feet. However, the tuning device looks rather unsightly and thus many qin players prefer the traditional manner of tuning; many also feel that the strings should be firmly wrapped to the goose feet in order that the sound may be "grounded" into the qin. Further, one cannot wrap silk strings around such tuning pins as they tend to break more easily at the wrapping end.

== Recent issues on strings ==
Although the future of metal-nylon string manufacture is secure, the manufacture situation of silk strings is not. Throughout the ages, particularly the political disturbances of the twentieth century as well as the popularity of the metal-nylon strings, has seen silk string manufacture decline. Plus the difficulty in obtaining the best quality silk and the difficulty in obtaining a high quality throughout has brought about only short phases now and again of silk string manufacture.

There has been efforts to produce silk strings to the quality and standard that they were before the disruptions. Wong Shu-chee led the first serious undertaking to produce good quality silk strings around the turn of the century producing his strings under the Taigu brand (defunct around 2009). Since then there has been the revived Jinyu brand (under the supervision of one of the last silk string makers of the former era) and the Huqiu brand, improved from a decade ago. Also, Japanese silk string makers have attempted making strings for the qin. Since 2013, there are around half a dozen of so groups researching on traditional silk string making in the hope of producing silk strings to the best standard and quality.

== The pros and cons of silk and metal-nylon strings ==
To summarise, here are the pros and cons of silk and metal-nylon strings:

=== Silk ===
Pros

- Uniqueness: has a special quality and sound that metal-nylon strings cannot fully embody. Harmonics purer than on metal-nylon.
- Elegance: more elegant and ancient to use. Preferred by the traditionalists.
- Re-usability: one string can be re-used several times before it must be replaced.
- Less harmful: does not damage the instrument or wear down the lacquer to a greater extent than metal-nylon.
- Stringing: easier to string than metal-nylon.
- Environmental: bio-degradable and natural. Renewable source. Can last centuries.

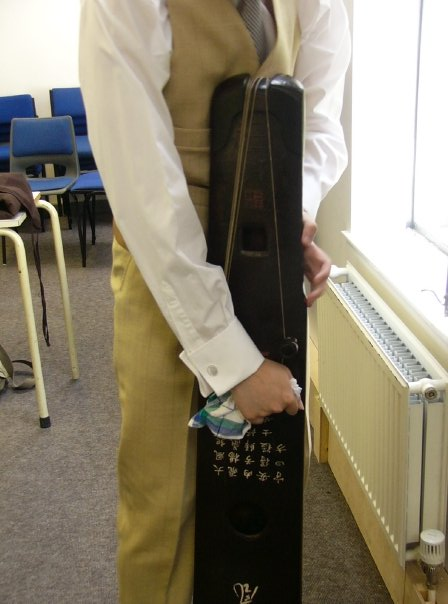
Stringing the qin in the traditional way. The end of the string is pulled into tune then, keeping that tension, the end is wrapped around the goose feet. Afterwards, the short end is tucked into the incoming strings.

Cons

- Stability: tends to de-tune from time to time and requires re-stringing or re-adjusting. Also, the climate plays a part in its playability.
- Strength: tends to break more often and more easily than metal-nylon. Not suitable for excessively hard play.
- Volume: very quiet and requires you to be in a near perfect environment in order to hear yourself play.
- Usage: more difficult to play. Weaknesses in play become more noticeable.
- Sound: some may find the scratchy sounds during the slides not to their taste. Also, buzzing sounds can occur, but that arises from the player plucking too hard.
- Cost: quality sets are expensive, but that is mainly due to the market situation.

=== Metal-nylon ===
Pros

- Volume: louder and more suitable for concert and performance to a large number of people.
- Strength: stronger and breaks less than silk.
- Stability: retains tuning without further adjustments.
- Usage: easier to play and smooth to slide on.
- Cost: inexpensive in the long run.

Cons

- Harmful: tends to wear the instrument down (especially the lacquer), meaning more repairs.
- Tone: tends to be too 'metallic' for some.
- Stringing: hard to string. High tension requires a lot of strength and effort on the player, though this is eliminated if you use the new tuning device.
- Re-usability: once a string breaks, it cannot be re-used, like silk. Also, metal core is prone to rust.
- Environmental: not bio-degradable.

== Etymological note on the word 'string' ==
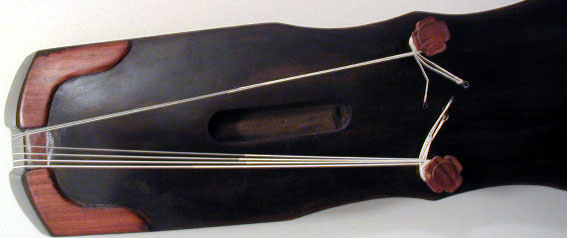
How the qin is traditionally strung; the strings wrap around the goose-feet. Strings 1 to 4 on the outer foot, and strings 5 to 7 on the inner foot. Image courtesy of Chinese Culture Net

There are a number of Chinese characters for the word string(s). 『絃』, 『弦』, 『線』 and 『綫』. According to Chinese Characters (1915), 『線』 and 『綫/线』 are both the same character (the former used in Taiwan and Hong Kong, the later used in mainland China in its simplified form), which meaning is 'thread', 'line' or 'wire'. However, the characters 『絃』 and 『弦』 mean the same thing ('string'), but have different etymological meanings. In the case of 『絃』, the radical is 「糸」, which is the radical for silk, whilst for 『弦』, the radical is 「弓」 which is the radical for the archery 'bow'. It is important to distinguish from the two as they are often used to refer to the strings of the qin, or any other stringed instrument, sometimes together on the same page. However, etymologically, 『絃』 is the correct character to be used to refer to strings of the qin as the radical denotes, qin strings were made of silk (though probably etymologically incorrect for the modern metal-nylon strings). But for 『弦』, it probably denotes a string used on an instrument which requires a bow to play, such as erhu or violin. Maybe, 『弦』 can also be used to refer to metal / metal-nylon strings...
