= Wenxin Yinghua metro station =

Metro station in Taichung, Taiwan

Wenxin Yinghua 109 文心櫻花
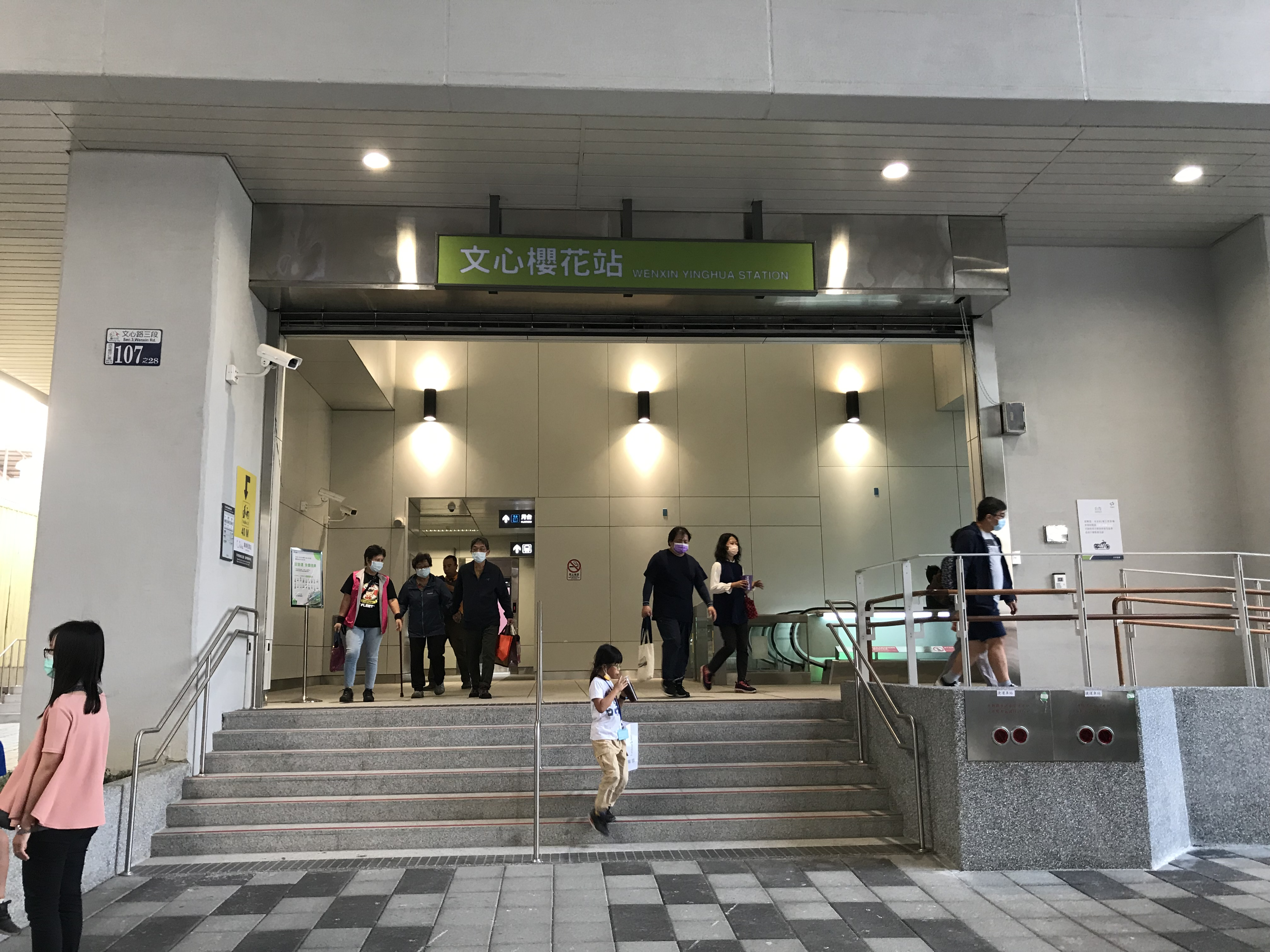

General information
- Location: Xitun, Taichung; Taiwan
- Coordinates: 24°10′3.000″N 120°39′14.000″E
- Operated by: Taichung MRT
- Line: Green line
- Platforms: 2 side platforms

Construction
- Structure type: Elevated

Other information
- Station code: 109

History
- Opened: 25 April 2021

Services
Preceding station	Taichung MRT	Following station
Taichung City Hall towards HSR Taichung Station	Green line	Wenhua Senior High School towards Beitun Main
Location

Wenxin Yinghua metro station
- Chinese: 文心櫻花站
Transcriptions
Standard Mandarin
- Hanyu Pinyin: Wénxīn Yīnghuā Zhàn
- Bopomofo: ㄨㄣˊ ㄒㄧㄣ ㄧㄥ ㄏㄨㄚ ㄓㄢˋ
- Tongyong Pinyin: Wúnsin Yinghua Jhàn

Wenxin Yinghua is a metro station on the Green line operated by Taichung MRT in Xitun District, Taichung, Taiwan.

The station name is taken from its location at the intersection of Wenxin and Yinghua roads.

== Station layout ==
4F	Crossover level	Platforms-connecting overpass
3F
3F	Side platform, doors will open on the right
3F	Track 1	Green line: towards HSR Taichung Station (Taichung City Hall)
3F	Track 2	Green line: towards Beitun Main (Wenhua Senior High School)
3F	Side platform, doors will open on the right
3F	Concourse
3F	Concourse	Lobby, information desk, automatic ticket dispensing machines, one-way faregates
2F	Mezzanine	Transitlink floor for stairs and escalators
1F	Street level	Exit/entrance
