= National Wen-Hua Senior High School =

Taichung Municipal Wen-Hua Senior High School
- 臺中市立文華高級中等學校
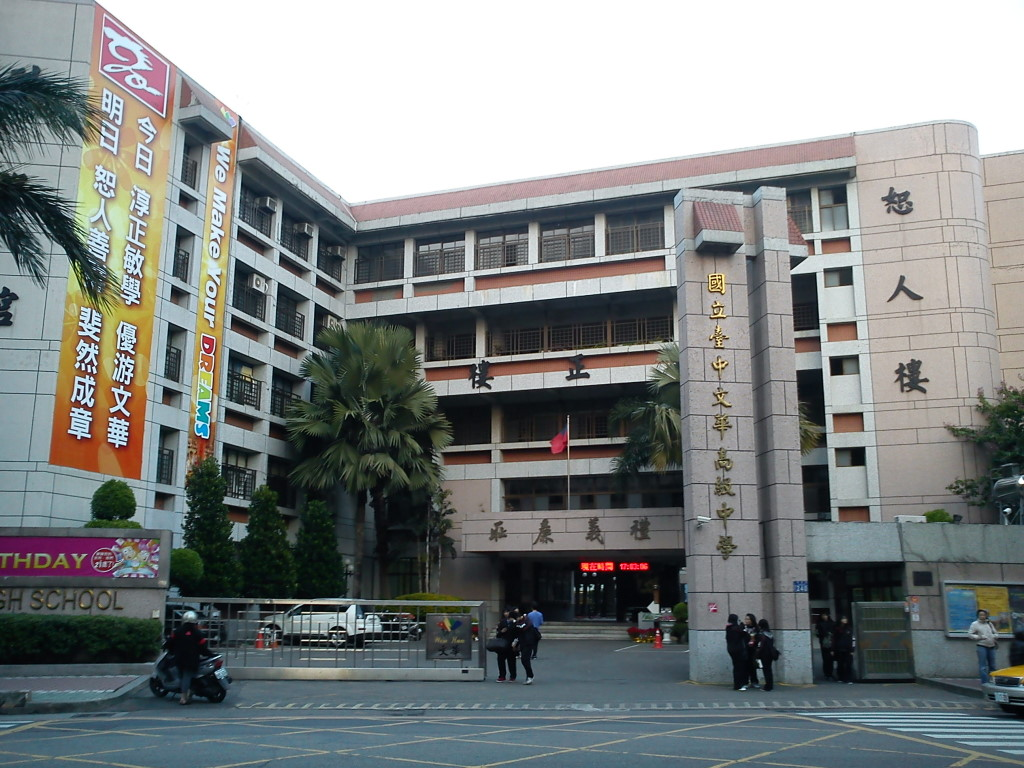
- The Main Gate of WHSH

Location
- No.240, Ningsia Rd., Situn Dist. Taichung City; 40750; Taiwan; 24°10′13″N 120°39′36″E

Information
- Type: Public
- Motto: Chinese: 淳恕敏善
- Established: 1 July 1989
- Principal: 黃偉立, Weili, Huang
- Faculty: 186 (2010)
- Grades: Grade 10 to 12
- Enrollment: 2,079 (2021)
- Campus size: 36,722 m²
- Campus type: Urban
- Color
- Website: www.whsh.tc.edu.tw

Taichung Municipal Wen-Hua Senior High School
- Traditional Chinese: 臺中市立文華高級中學
Transcriptions
Standard Mandarin
- Hanyu Pinyin: Guólì Wénhuá Gāojízhōngxué

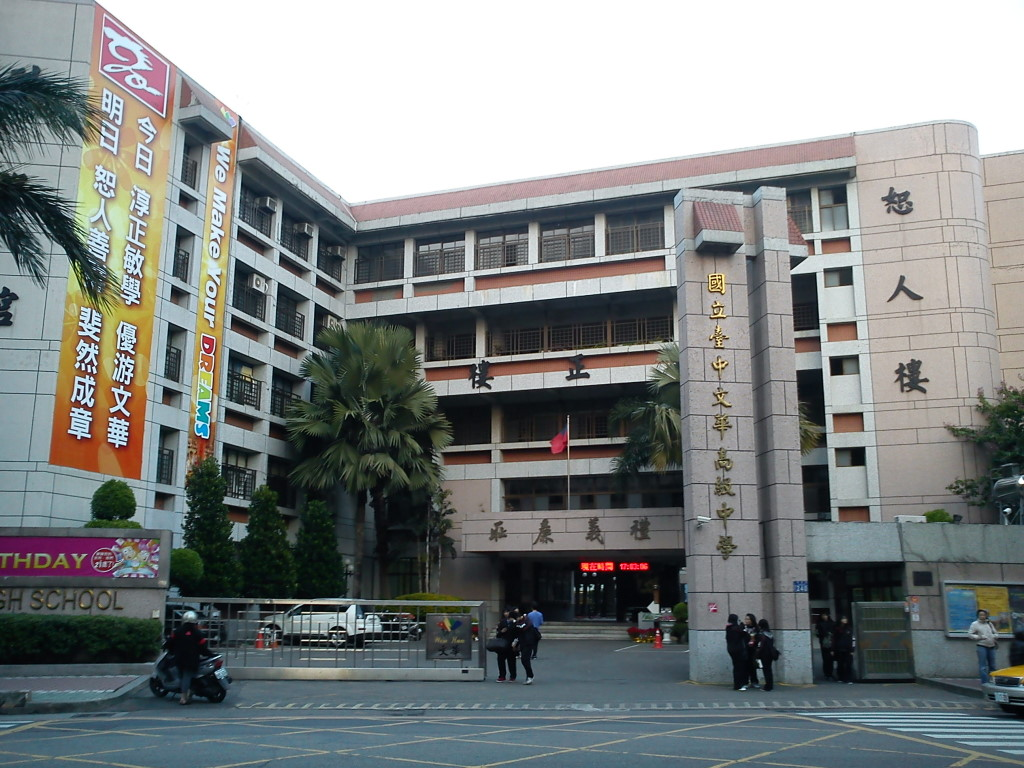
The Main Gate of WHSH

Taichung Municipal Wen-Hua Senior High School was founded on July 1, 1989. WHSH has been accredited by the Ministry of Education as a First Tier High School.

== Introduction ==
=== Location ===
The school is located close to the National Museum of Natural Science, Taichung City Hall, and Taichung Shuinan Economic and Trade Park. Wenhua Senior High School Station (文華高中站) is next to the school.

=== Reputation ===
Some of the students in WHSH also choose to study in the United States and Europe.

Wen-Hua Senior High School is also a well-known member of the Four Provincial Schools (四省中) in Taichung area. From 2015, WHSH and other four famous high schools in Taichung have established the Taichung Big 5 affiliation.

The school provides excellent STEM courses, humanities courses, and Dancing courses in national standard.

== History ==
WHSH is one of the youngest schools in Taiwan and it is also the only school of the "Four Schools" established after the World War II period.

- WHSH has established in 1989 to fulfill the strong need of intermediate education because of the explosive population growth in great Taichung area. It was named Taiwan Provincial Taichung Wen-Hua Senior High School as it was first founded.
- In 2000, due to the "Government Reformation," the school was managed by the central government under Ministry of Education, and renamed National Wen-Hua Senior High School.

== Partner Schools ==
- United StatesPacific Ridge School
- United StatesDistrict of Columbia International School
- JapanUedaNishi High School
- MalaysiaTsun Jin High School
- South KoreaSejong Global High School
- SwitzerlandLeysin American School
- GermanyFriedrich-Schiller-Gymnasium Marbach

== See also ==
- Education in Taiwan
