= Songzhu Temple =

Guanyin temple in Beitun, Taichung, Taiwan

- 松竹寺
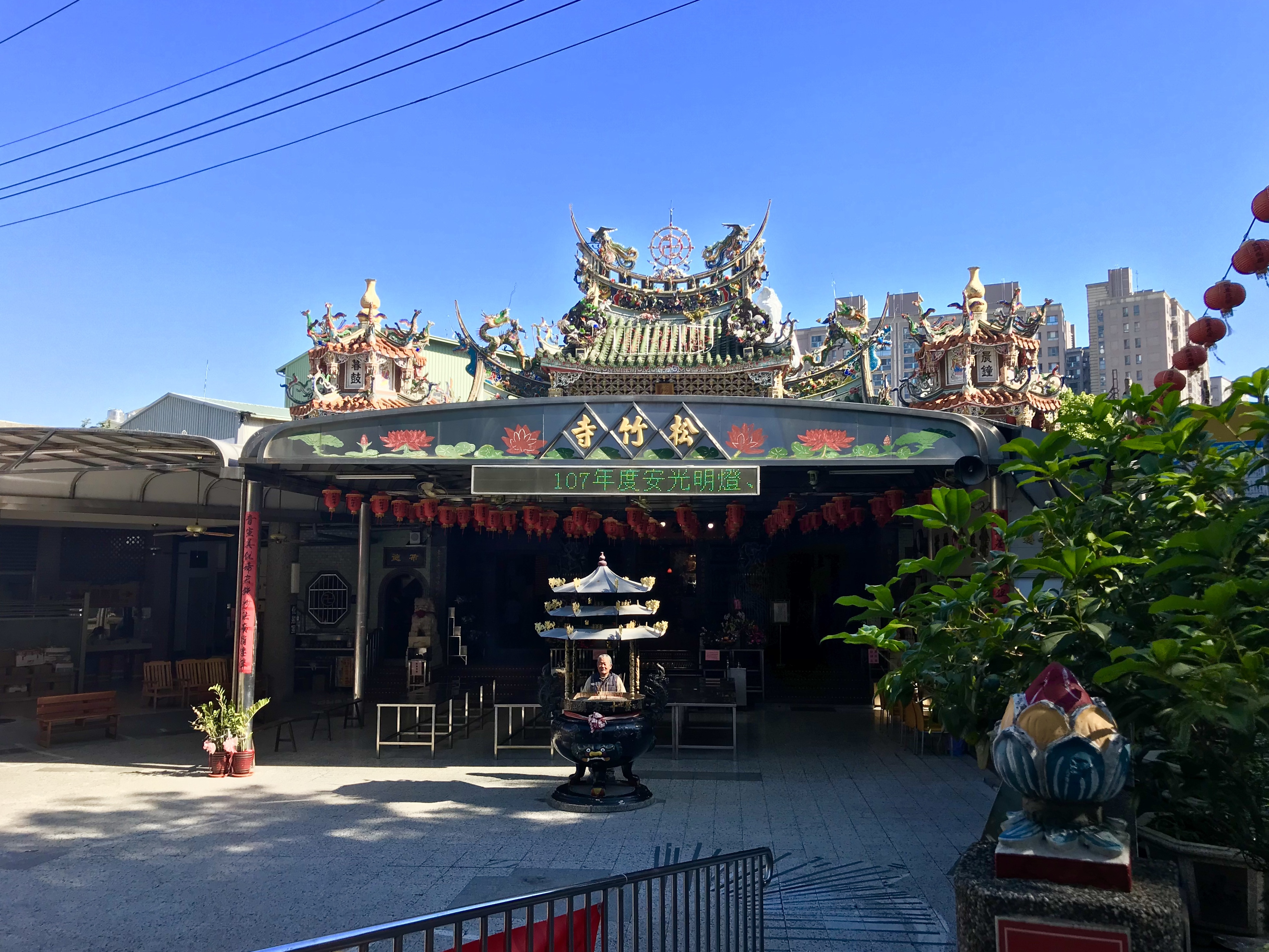

Religion
- Affiliation: Chinese folk religion
- Deity: Guanyin

Location
- Location: Beitun District, Taichung
- Country: Taiwan
- Interactive map of Songzhu Temple
- Coordinates: 24.183002°N 120.692571°E

Architecture
- Completed: 1833
- Direction of façade: Southwest

Songzhu Temple (Chinese: 松竹寺; pinyin: Sōngzhúsì) is a folk religion temple located in Beitun District, Taichung, Taiwan. Built in 1833, the temple is dedicated to a specific Guanyin statue known as "Waterflow Guanyin" (水流觀音; Shuǐliú Guānyīn). (Note: No established translation of the Guanyin's name exists. "Waterflow" is a literal translation of 水流.)

== History ==
According to legend, in the summer of 1830, a Guanyin statue carried by a flood got stuck in a bamboo forest at the site of the current temple. After the water settled, a group of children found the statue and began worshiping it in the forest. Afterwards, a woman was having a difficult childbirth when a passing midwife came to help. As a token of appreciation, the woman promised to visit the midwife's home in the future. However, the midwife's directions led her to the bamboo forest. Through poe divination, the Guanyin revealed that she was the midwife. Therefore, a temple was built to house the statue in 1833, and the Waterflow Guanyin became a deity for safe pregnancies.

A 20 m tall fiberglass statue of Guanyin was erected in 1988. During Typhoon Haitang in 2005, the statue fell over and was destroyed, which was interpreted as the Guanyin sacrificing itself for the people. The statue has since been restored.

== Filial piety tree ==
In the temple's courtyard, there is a sea fig tree that is thought to be more than 160 years old. The 15 m tree has two main trunks, giving it the nickname "filial piety tree" (孝子樹). The tree is listed as one of Taichung's protected trees.

On 2 June 2013, the larger of the two trunks cracked from earthquake damage, causing the trunk to tip over. The tree is repaired and is supported by I-beams.

== Gallery ==
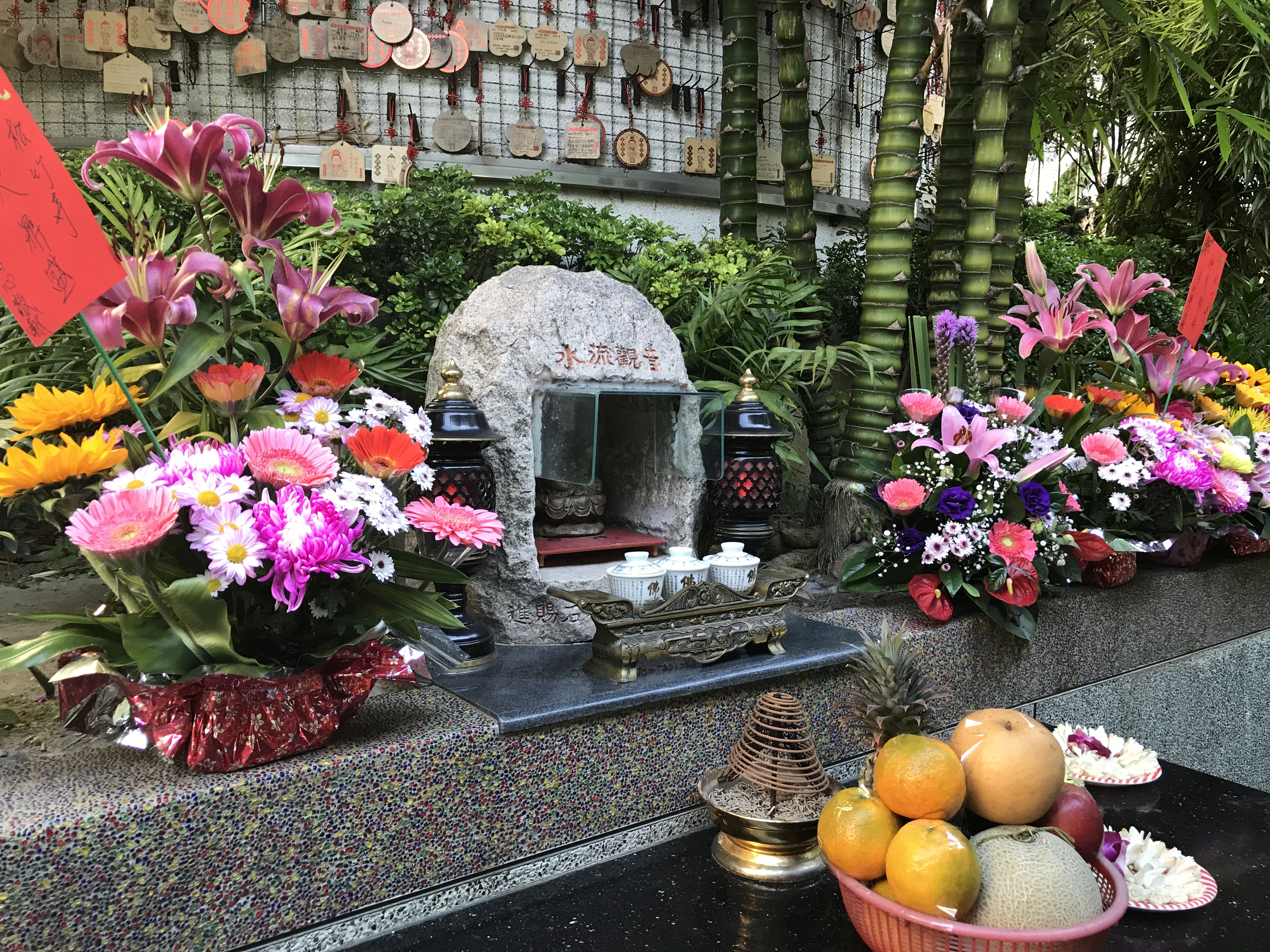
The Waterflow Guanyin statue. The statue is placed inside the rock in the back of the temple.

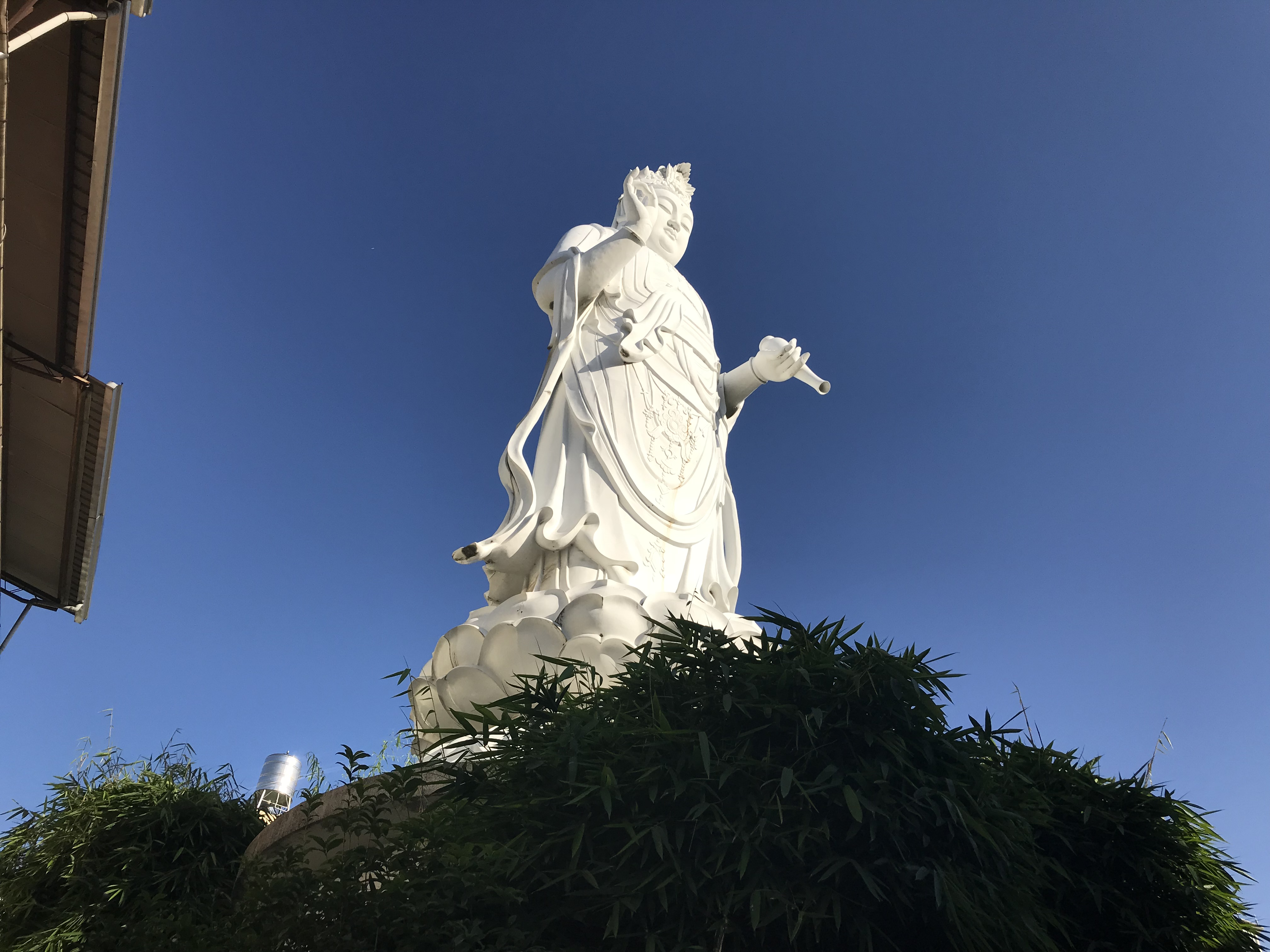
The 20 m tall Guanyin statue is located directly behind the Waterflow Guanyin.

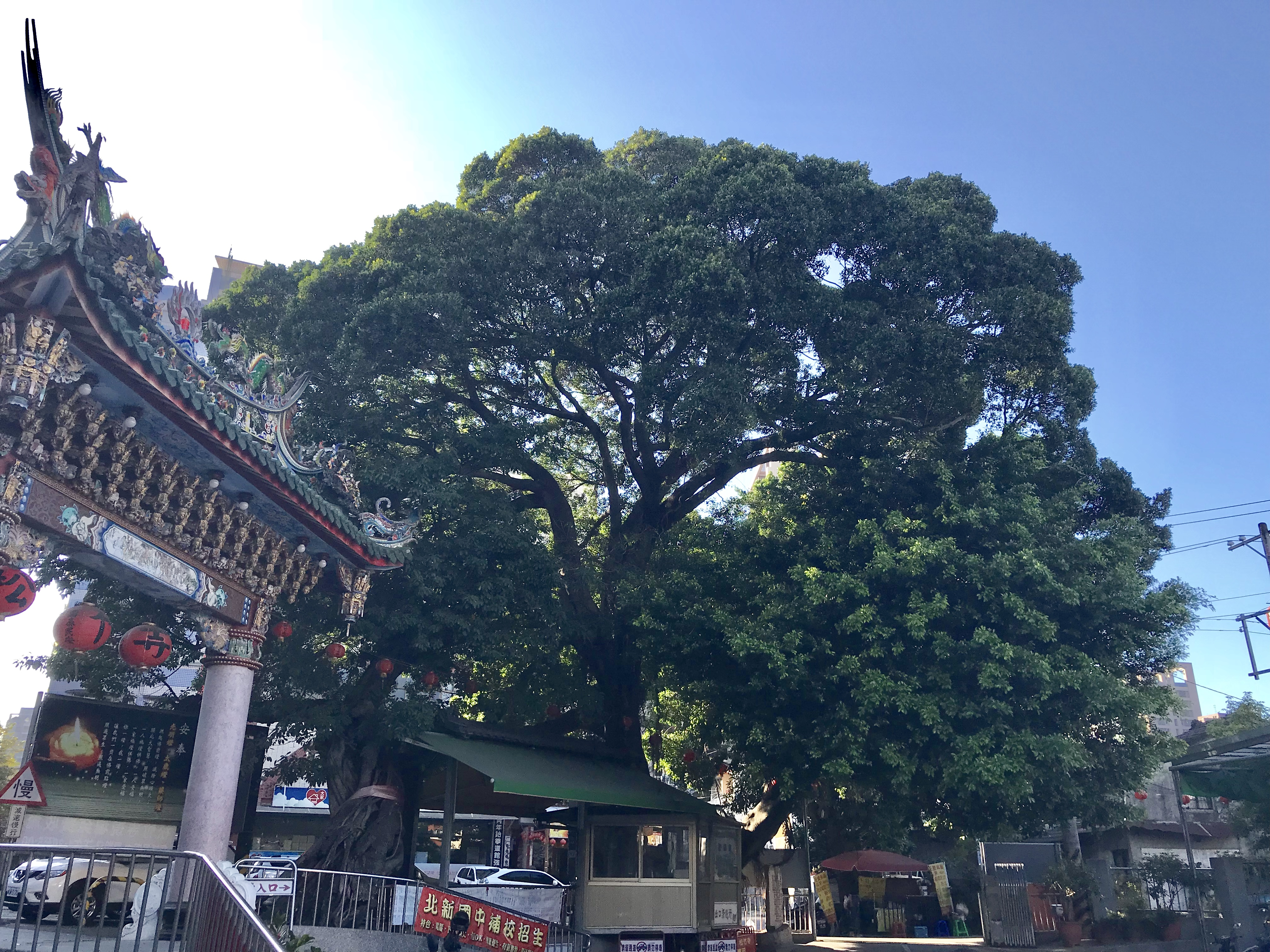
The filial piety tree.
