= Wenxin Chongde metro station =

Metro station in Taichung, Taiwan

Wenxin Chongde 106 文心崇德
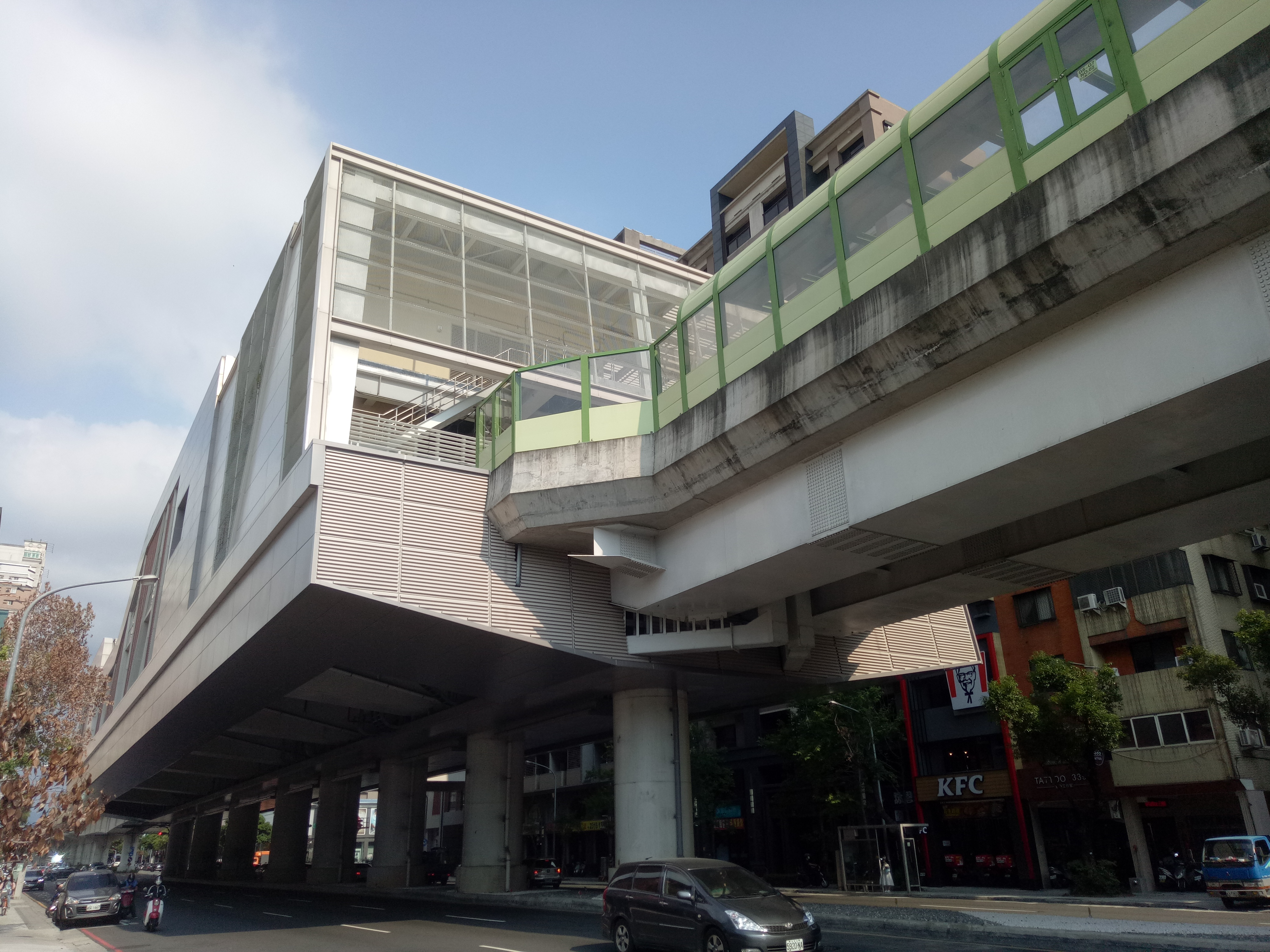

General information
- Location: Beitun, Taichung; Taiwan
- Coordinates: 24°10′19.999″N 120°41′6.000″E
- Operated by: Taichung MRT
- Line: Green line
- Platforms: 2 side platforms

Construction
- Structure type: Elevated

Other information
- Station code: 106

History
- Opened: 25 April 2021

Services
Preceding station	Taichung MRT	Following station
Wenxin Zhongqing towards HSR Taichung Station	Green line	Sihwei Elementary School towards Beitun Main
Location

Wenxin Chongde metro station
- Chinese: 文心崇德站
Transcriptions
Standard Mandarin
- Hanyu Pinyin: Wénxīn Chóngdé Zhàn
- Bopomofo: ㄨㄣˊ ㄒㄧㄣ ㄔㄨㄥˊ ㄉㄜˊ ㄓㄢˋ
- Tongyong Pinyin: Wúnsin Chóngdé Jhàn

Wenxin Chongde is a metro station on the Green line operated by Taichung MRT in Beitun District, Taichung, Taiwan.

The station name is taken from its location at the intersection of Wenxin and Chongde Roads.

== Station layout ==
4F	Crossover level	Platforms-connecting overpass
3F
3F	Side platform, doors will open on the right
3F	Track 1	Green line: towards HSR Taichung Station (Wenxin Zhongqing)
3F	Track 2	Green line: towards Beitun Main (Sihwei Elementary School)
3F	Side platform, doors will open on the right
3F	Concourse
3F	Concourse	Lobby, information desk, automatic ticket dispensing machines, one-way faregates
2F	Mezzanine	Transitlink floor for stairs and escalators
1F	Street level	Exit/entrance
