= Wenxin Zhongqing metro station =

Metro station in Taichung, Taiwan

Wenxin Zhongqing 107 文心中清
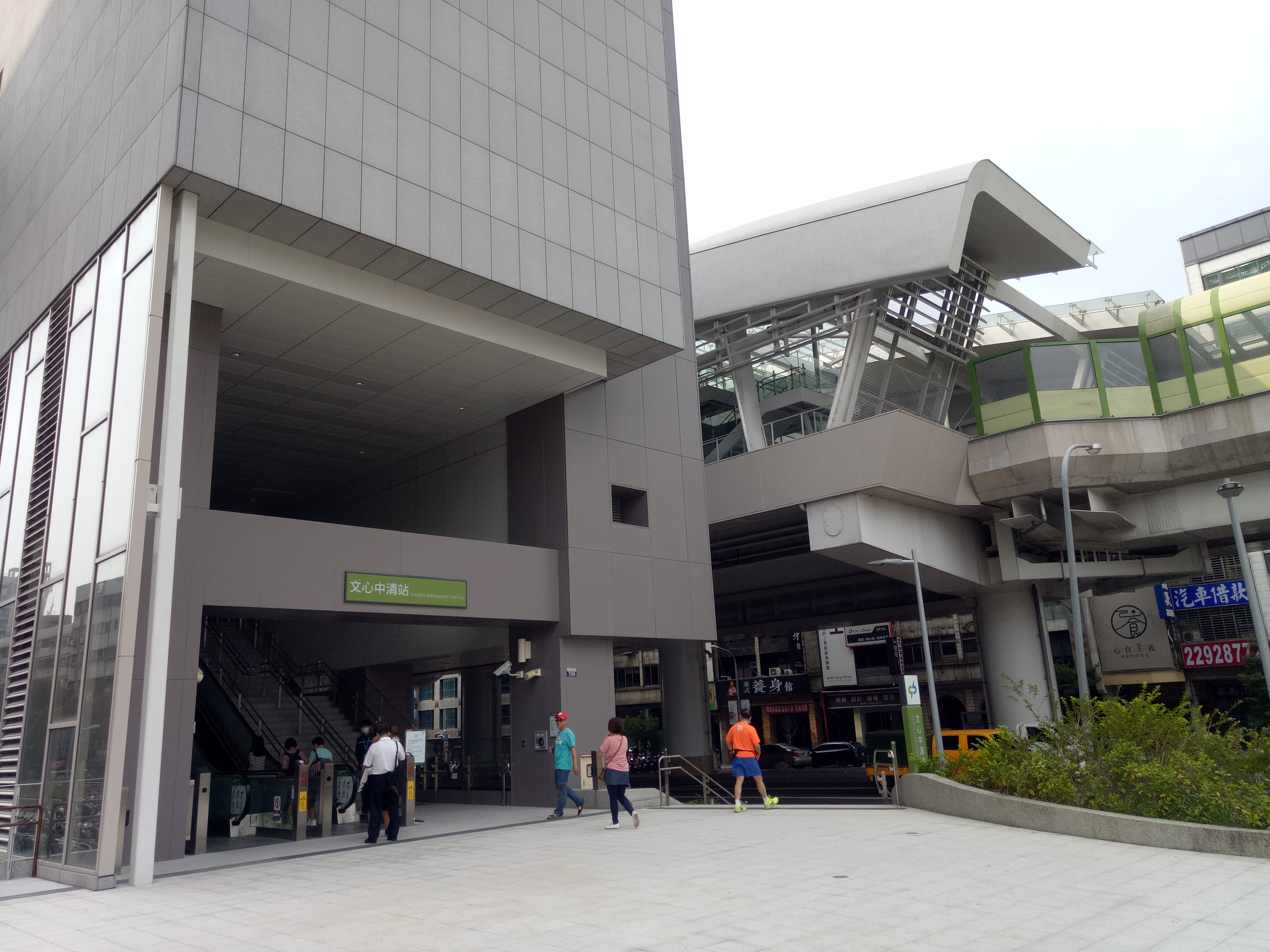

General information
- Location: North, Taichung; Taiwan
- Coordinates: 24°10′23.999″N 120°40′14.002″E
- Operated by: Taichung MRT
- Line: Green line
- Platforms: 2 side platforms

Construction
- Structure type: Elevated

Other information
- Station code: 107

History
- Opened: 25 April 2021

Services
Preceding station	Taichung MRT	Following station
Wenhua Senior High School towards HSR Taichung Station	Green line	Wenxin Chongde towards Beitun Main
Location

Wenxin Zhongqing metro station
- Chinese: 中清文心站
Transcriptions
Standard Mandarin
- Hanyu Pinyin: Wénxīn Zhōngqīng Zhàn
- Bopomofo: ㄨㄣˊ ㄒㄧㄣ ㄓㄨㄥ ㄑㄧㄥ ㄓㄢˋ
- Tongyong Pinyin: Wúnsin Jhongcing Jhàn

Wenxin Zhongqing is a metro station on the Green line operated by Taichung MRT in North District, Taichung, Taiwan.

The station name is taken from its location at the intersection of Wenxin and Zhongqing Roads. Taichung MRT is planning for a transfer to the Orange Line at this stop.

== Station layout ==
4F	Crossover level	Platforms-connecting overpass
3F
3F	Side platform, doors will open on the right
3F	Track 1	Green line: towards HSR Taichung Station (Wenhua Senior High School)
3F	Track 2	Green line: towards Beitun Main (Wenxin Chongde)
3F	Side platform, doors will open on the right
3F	Concourse
3F	Concourse	Lobby, information desk, automatic ticket dispensing machines, one-way faregates
2F	Mezzanine	Transitlink floor for stairs and escalators
1F	Street level	Exit/entrance
