= List of jazz festivals =

This is a list of notable jazz festivals around the world.

== Historic jazz festivals ==
Name	Year	Location	Notes	Image
Ann Arbor Blues and Jazz Festival	1969–present	Ann Arbor, Michigan, U.S.		
Beaulieu Jazz Festival	1956–61	Beaulieu, Hampshire, UK	Lord Montagu of Beaulieu holds an annual trad and modern jazz festival in the ground of Beaulieu estate, in the New Forest.	
Bix Beiderbecke Memorial Jazz Festival	1971–Present	Davenport, Iowa, U.S.	This 3 day jazz festival in Bix Beiderbecke's hometown of Davenport, IA began when a group of East Coast musicians came to Davenport to pay homage to Bix by playing over his grave. The jam session at a local hotel afterwards was so hugely popular that the idea to hold it annually was born. The festival drew tens of thousands and has been held every year since. 2021 marks its 50th anniversary, making it one of the longest running jazz fests in the U.S.	Bix Beiderbecke Memorial Jazz Fest logo
Cavalcade of Jazz	1945–1958	Los Angeles, California, U.S.	Leon Hefflin Sr. produced the Cavalcade of Jazz at Wrigley Field, with jazz giants such as Count Basie, Nat King Cole, Lionel Hampton, Louis Armstrong, Dizzy Gillespie, Sam Cooke, Dinah Washington, Frankie Laine, Perez Prado, Sarah Vaughn, Valdez Orchestra, Ray Charles and over a hundred more artists.	
Clearwater Jazz Holiday	1979–present	Clearwater, Florida, U.S.		
DC Jazz Festival	2005–present	Washington, D.C., U.S.		
Festival International de Jazz	1959–1966	Comblain-la-Tour, Belgium	For eight years, between 1959 and 1966 at the initiative of a GI who survived the Rundstedt Offensive, the small Walloon village turned into one of the landmarks of the jazz world. Performing artists included John Coltrane, Ray Charles, Nina Simone, Stéphane Grappelli, Cannonball Adderley, Chet Baker, and Woody Herman.	
Five Points Jazz Festival (Denver)	2003–present	Denver, Colorado, USA	Five Points Jazz Festival is a free, all-day event held annually in Denver’s historic Five Points neighborhood. From its humble first year which featured one stage and only three bands, the festival has grown into an all-day event with almost 50 bands, 10 stages and performance spaces and 100,000 visitors. In 2020, DAV collaborated with Rocky Mountain PBS and KUVO to broadcast a virtual event that garnered two Colorado Broadcasters Association awards and a Heartland Emmy® nomination.	
Golden River City Jazz Festival	1960–2016	Kortrijk, Belgium	Focusing on Jazz. The Festival was an opportunity for The Golden River City Jazz Band to showcase their repertoire and to mingle with international musicians	
Jazz at the Lake: Lake George Jazz Weekend	1984–present	Lake George, New York, U.S.		
Jazz Bilzen	1965–1981	Bilzen, Belgium	This was the first festival on the continent where jazz and pop music were brought together. Sometimes called the "mother of all (European) festivals," Bilzen started out featuring jazz, but eventually incorporated blues, folk, rock and soul, punk and new wave as well.	
JazzFest Berlin	1964–present	Berlin, Germany	The festival's artistic concept has been to document, support, and validate trends in jazz, and to mirror the diversity of creative musical activity.	
Jefferson St. Jazz & Blues Festival	2000–present	Nashville, Tennessee, U.S.		
Kongsberg Jazzfestival	1964–present	Kongsberg, Norway	The second jazz festival started in Norway.	
Moldejazz	1961–present	Molde, Norway	The first jazz festival in Norway.	
Montreal International Jazz Festival	1979–present	Montreal, Quebec, Canada	The Festival International de Jazz de Montréal (English: Montreal International Jazz Festival) is an annual jazz festival held in Montreal, Quebec, Canada. The Montreal Jazz Fest holds the 2004 Guinness World Record as the world's largest jazz festival. Every year it features roughly 3,000 artists from 30-odd countries, more than 650 concerts (including 450 free outdoor performances), and welcomes over 2 million visitors (12.5% of whom are tourists) as well as 300 accredited journalists. The festival takes place at 20 different stages, which include free outdoor stages and indoor concert halls.	
National Jazz and Blues Festival	1961–1980s	United Kingdom	Originally oriented around jazz and blues, this annual festival soon became a showcase for progressive rock as well, featuring groups such as the psychedelic rock group Cream.	
Nattjazz	1972–present	Bergen, Norway	This is a central jazz festival in Norway oriented around the variety of jazz.	
New Orleans Jazz & Heritage Festival	1970–present	New Orleans, Louisiana, U.S.	This annual festival celebrates the indigenous music and culture of New Orleans and Louisiana, so the music encompasses every style associated with the city and the state: contemporary and traditional jazz, blues, R&B, gospel music, Cajun music, zydeco, Afro-Caribbean, folk music, Latin, rock, rap music, country music, and bluegrass.	
Newport Jazz Festival	1954–present	Newport, Rhode Island, U.S.	It was established in 1954 by socialite Elaine Lorillard. While initially focused on acoustic jazz, the festival's 1969 program was an experiment in fusing jazz, soul and rock music and audiences.	
Ocean Blue Jazz Festival	mid-1990s–early 2000s	Hitachinaka, Ibaraki		
Panama Jazz Festival	2003–present	Panama	With almost 20 years, the Panama Jazz Festival has become a cultural tourism attraction with the visit of more than 500,000 people from different latitudes. Currently, the event is sustainable thanks to the work of Patricia Zárate de Pérez, Executive Director of the festival who leads a team of 70 coordinators, 500 volunteers, 300 national and international musicians, and about 200 collaborators from all sectors of Panama, adding more than 1,000 people who work hard to carry out the event.	
Pori Jazz	1966–present	Pori, Finland	The first festival was based on acoustic jazz, but electric jazz and other rhythm music, blues, soul, funk, hip-hop and Cuban and Brazilian music gradually took foot.	
Prague International Jazz Festival	1964–present	Prague, Czech Republic		
Jersey City Jazz Festival	2013–present	Jersey City, New Jersey, U.S.	An annual festival in June based out of Hudson County. The festival (previously known as Riverview Jazz Festival) was started to create an awareness of the internationally known jazz musicians living in Jersey City.	
Tobago Jazz Festival	2004–present	Trinidad and Tobago	American magazine Forbes in 2008 voted the festival "third Biggest Event on Planet Earth"	

== Jazz festivals by country ==
The following is an incomplete list of notable jazz festivals, including both current and defunct festivals of note.

=== Africa ===
==== Angola ====
- Luanda International Jazz Festival in Luanda

==== Lesotho ====
- Morija Arts & Cultural Festival in Morija

==== Morocco ====
- Tanjazz in Tangier

==== Nigeria ====
- Lagos International Jazz Festival in Lagos
- Music Week Africa
- Afrojazz Festival Nigeria

==== South Africa ====
- Cape Town International Jazz Festival in Cape Town
- National Youth Jazz Festival in Grahamstown

=== Americas ===
==== Argentina ====
- Buenos Aires Jazz Festival in Buenos Aires

==== Barbados ====
- Barbados Jazz Festival

==== Brazil ====
- Fest Bossa & Jazz in Rio Grande do Norte

==== Canada ====
- Halifax Jazz Festival in Halifax, Nova Scotia
- Beaches International Jazz Festival in Toronto
- Downtown Oakville Jazz Festival in Oakville, Ontario
- Festi Jazz International de Rimouski, Rimouski, Quebec
- Harvest Jazz and Blues Festival in Fredericton, New Brunswick
- Montreal International Jazz Festival in Montreal
- Ottawa Jazz Festival in Ottawa
- Sasktel Saskatchewan Jazz Fest in Saskatoon, Regina, and Prince Albert in Saskatchewan
- TD Edmonton International Jazz Festival in Edmonton, Alberta
- Toronto Downtown Jazz Festival in Toronto, Ontario
- Vancouver International Jazz Festival in Vancouver
- Winnipeg International Jazz Festival in Winnipeg, Manitoba

==== Haiti ====
- Port-au-Prince International Jazz Festival

==== Jamaica ====
- Jamaica Jazz and Blues Festival

==== Mexico ====
- Nuevo León Jazz Festival in Monterrey
- Riviera Maya Jazz Festival in Playa del Carmen

==== Panama ====
- Panama Jazz Festival

==== Puerto Rico ====
- Ponce Jazz Festival

==== Saint Lucia ====
- Saint Lucia Jazz Festival

==== Trinidad and Tobago ====
- Tobago Jazz Festival

==== United States ====
Alabama

- Taste of 4th Avenue Jazz Festival in Birmingham
- W. C. Handy Music Festival in Florence

Alaska

- Sitka Jazz Festival in Sitka

California

- Banjo Jubilee Jazz Festival in San Jose
- Berkeley Jazz Festival in Berkeley
- Cavalcade of Jazz in Los Angeles
- Concord Jazz Festival in Concord
- Hardly Strictly Bluegrass in San Francisco
- Monterey Jazz Festival in Monterey
- Playboy Jazz Festival in Hollywood Bowl, Los Angeles
- Sacramento Jazz Jubilee in Sacramento
- San Francisco Blues Festival
- San Francisco Jazz Festival in San Francisco
- San Jose Jazz Festival in San Jose
- Stanford Jazz Festival in Palo Alto
- Yosemite International Jazz Festival in Coarsegold

Connecticut

- Litchfield Jazz Festival in Goshen

Delaware

- Clifford Brown Jazz Festival in Wilmington

District of Columbia

- DC Jazz Festival

Florida

- Jacksonville Jazz Festival in Jacksonville

Idaho

- Lionel Hampton Jazz Festival in Moscow

Illinois

- Chicago Jazz Festival in Chicago

Indiana

- Indy Jazz Fest in Indianapolis
- Notre Dame Collegiate Jazz Festival in Notre Dame

Iowa

- Bix Beiderbecke Memorial Jazz Festival in Davenport

Louisiana

- French Quarter Festival in New Orleans
- Highland Jazz & Blues Festival in Shreveport
- New Orleans Jazz & Heritage Festival in New Orleans
- Satchmo SummerFest in New Orleans

Massachusetts

- Provincetown Jazz Festival in Provincetown
- Tanglewood Jazz Festival in Tanglewood

Michigan

- Detroit International Jazz Festival in Detroit

Minnesota

- Twin Cities Jazz Festival in Minneapolis–Saint Paul

Nebraska

- Omaha Blues, Jazz, & Gospel Festival in Omaha

New Jersey

- James Moody Jazz Festival in Newark, New Jersey
- Exit Zero Jazz Festival (Cape May, NJ) 2012–present, 2 times annually

New York

- Blue Note Jazz Festival in New York City
- Essentially Ellington High School Jazz Band Competition and Festival at Lincoln Center in New York City
- Rochester International Jazz Festival in Rochester
- Saratoga Jazz Festival (aka Freihofer's Jazz Festival) in Saratoga Springs
- Vision Festival in New York City
- Jazz at the Lake: Lake George Jazz Weekend in upstate New York

Oregon

- Cathedral Park Jazz Festival, Portland
- Portland Jazz Festival, Portland
- Vanport Jazz Festival, Portland

Pennsylvania

- RiverJazz Festival in Bethlehem

Rhode Island

- Newport Jazz Festival in Newport

South Dakota

- Sioux Falls Jazz and Blues Festival in Sioux Falls

Texas

- Denton Arts and Jazz Festival in Denton
- Fort Worth Music Festival, formerly Jazz By The Boulevard

Virginia

- Hampton Jazz Festival in Hampton

Washington

- Centrum (also known as Jazz Port Townsend)
- Earshot Jazz Festival in Seattle

=== Asia ===
==== Azerbaija ====
Performances in Baku

- Baku International Jazz Festival in Baku

==== China ====
- Beijing Jazz Festival in Beijing

==== Georgia ====
- Black Sea Jazz Festival in Batumi
- Tbilisi Jazz Festival in Tbilisi

==== India ====
- Indigo Jazz and Blues Festival

==== Indonesia ====
- Jakarta International Jazz Festival - Jak.Jazz in Jakarta
- Jakarta International Java Jazz Festival - Java Jazz in Jakarta
- Jazz Goes To Campus in Depok, West Java
- North Sumatra Jazz Festival in Medan, North Sumatra

==== Israel ====
- Red Sea Jazz Festival in Eilat

==== Japan ====
- Live under the sky in Tokyo
- Mt. Fuji Jazz Festival in Yamanashi
- Newport Jazz Festival in Madarao

==== Nepal ====
- Jazzmandu in Kathmandu

==== Philippines ====
- The Philippine International Jazz & Arts Festival

==== South Korea ====
- Jarasum International Jazz Festival in Jarasum
- Seoul Jazz Festival in Seoul

==== Taiwan ====
- Taichung Jazz Festival in Taichung

==== Thailand ====
- Bangkok Jazz Festival in Bangkok
- Hua Hin Jazz Festival in Hua Hin

==== United Arab Emirates ====
- Dubai International Jazz Festival

=== Europe ===
==== Belgium ====
- Blue Note Festival in Ghent
- Django à Liberchies in Liberchies
- Golden River City Jazz Festival in Kortrijk
- Jazz Bilzen
- Jazz Middelheim in Antwerp

==== Bosnia and Herzegovina ====
- Jazz Fest Sarajevo in Sarajevo

==== Bulgaria ====
- Varna Jazz Days Festival in Varna,

==== Denmark ====
- Aarhus International Jazz Festival in Aarhus
- Copenhagen Jazz Festival in Copenhagen

==== Finland ====
- April Jazz in Espoo
- Baltic Jazz in Dalsbruk (Taalintehdas), Kimitoön
- Pori Jazz in Pori
- Tampere Jazz Happening in Tampere

==== France ====
- Charlie Jazz Festival in Vitrolles, Provence
- Cognac Blues Passions in Cognac
- Jazz à Juan in Antibes
- Jazz à Saint-Germain-des-Prés Paris in Paris
- Jazz à Vienne in Vienne
- Jazz in Marciac in Marciac
- Jazz sous les pommiers in Coutances
- Nice Jazz Festival in Nice
- Paris Jazz Festival in the Bois de Vincennes

==== Germany ====
- Internationales Dixieland Festival in Dresden
- Internationales Jazzfestival Münster
- Jazz Baltica in Salzau
- JazzFest Berlin in Berlin
- Moers Festival in Moers

==== Ireland ====
- Bray Jazz Festival in Bray, County Wicklow
- Cork Jazz Festival in Cork City, County Cork
- Harvest Time Blues in Monaghan, County Monaghan

==== Italy ====
- Beat Onto Jazz Festival in Bitonto
- Fano Jazz by The Sea in Fano
- Garda Jazz Festival in Trentino
- Rome Jazz Festival in Rome
- Umbria Jazz in Perugia

==== Latvia ====
- Saulkrasti Jazz Festival in Saulkrasti

==== Lithuania ====
- Kaunas Jazz in Kaunas
- Vilnius Mama Jazz Festival in Vilnius

==== Malta ====
- Malta Jazz Festival in Valletta

==== Netherlands ====
- Amersfoort Jazz in Amersfoort
- Jazz Festival Enkhuizen in Enkhuizen
- North Sea Jazz Festival formerly in The Hague, now in Rotterdam

==== North Macedonia ====
- Skopje Jazz Festival in Skopje

==== Norway ====
- Bodø Jazz Open in Bodø
- Canal Street in Arendal
- DølaJazz in Lillehammer
- Ice Music Festival in Geilo
- Kongsberg Jazzfestival in Kongsberg
- MaiJazz in Stavanger
- Moldejazz in Molde
- Nattjazz in Bergen
- Nordlysfestivalen in Tromsø
- Oslo Jazzfestival in Oslo
- Polarjazz in Longyearbyen
- Punktfestivalen in Kristiansand
- Sildajazz in Haugesund
- Trondheim Jazz Festival in Trondheim
- Vossajazz in Voss

==== Poland ====
- Jazz Jamboree in Warsaw
- Komeda Jazz Festival in Słupsk
- Sopot Jazz Festival

==== Romania ====
- EUROPAfest in Bucharest
- Gărâna Jazz Festival in Gărâna, Caraș-Severin County
- International Jazz Day in Cluj-Napoca

==== Russia ====
- Jazz May in Penza

==== Serbia ====
- Nišville Jazz Festival in Niš
- Novi Sad Jazz Festival in Novi Sad

==== Slovakia ====
- Bratislava Jazz Days

==== Spain ====
- San Sebastian Jazz Festival
- Tarragona International Dixieland Festival in Tarragona

==== Sweden ====
- Stockholm Jazz Festival in Stockholm
- Umeå Jazz Festival in Umeå

==== Switzerland ====
- Ascona Jazz Festival in Ascona
- Montreux Jazz Festival in Montreux

==== Turkey ====
- Istanbul Jazz Festival in Istanbul
- İzmir European Jazz Festival in İzmir

==== Ukraine ====
- Alfa Jazz Fest in Lviv
- Koktebel Jazz Festival in Koktebel, Crimea

==== United Kingdom ====
- Appleby Jazz Festival
- Bath International Music Festival in Bath
- Brecon Jazz Festival in Wales
- Callander Jazz and Blues Festival in Scotland
- Cheltenham Jazz Festival in Cheltenham
- City of Derry Jazz and Big Band Festival in Northern Ireland
- Glasgow International Jazz Festival in Glasgow
- Ipswich Jazz Festival in Ipswich, Suffolk
- Llandudno Jazz Festival in North Wales
- London Jazz Festival in London
- Manchester Jazz Festival in Manchester
- Marsden Jazz Festival, West Yorks.

=== Oceania ===
==== Australia ====
- Australian Jazz Convention, alternating cities in Australia
- Dingo Creek Jazz and Blues Festival, Traveston, Queensland
- Grampians Jazz Festival, Halls Gap, Victoria (defunct)
- Melbourne International Jazz Festival, Victoria
- Merimbula Jazz Festival, NSW
- Generations In Jazz, Mount Gambier, South Australia
- Perth International Jazz Festival
- Wagga Wagga Jazz Festival, Wagga Wagga, New South Wales (defunct)
- Wangaratta Festival of Jazz, Wangaratta, Victoria
- Marysville Jazz and Blues Weekend, Marysville, Victoria

==== New Zealand ====
- Taupo Jazz Festival in Taupō, New Zealand

== See also ==
- Jazz improvisation

=== Related lists ===
- List of years in jazz
- List of historic rock festivals
- List of jam band music festivals
- List of music festivals
- List of reggae festivals
