= Mehmet Ali Sanlıkol =

Turkish-American composer

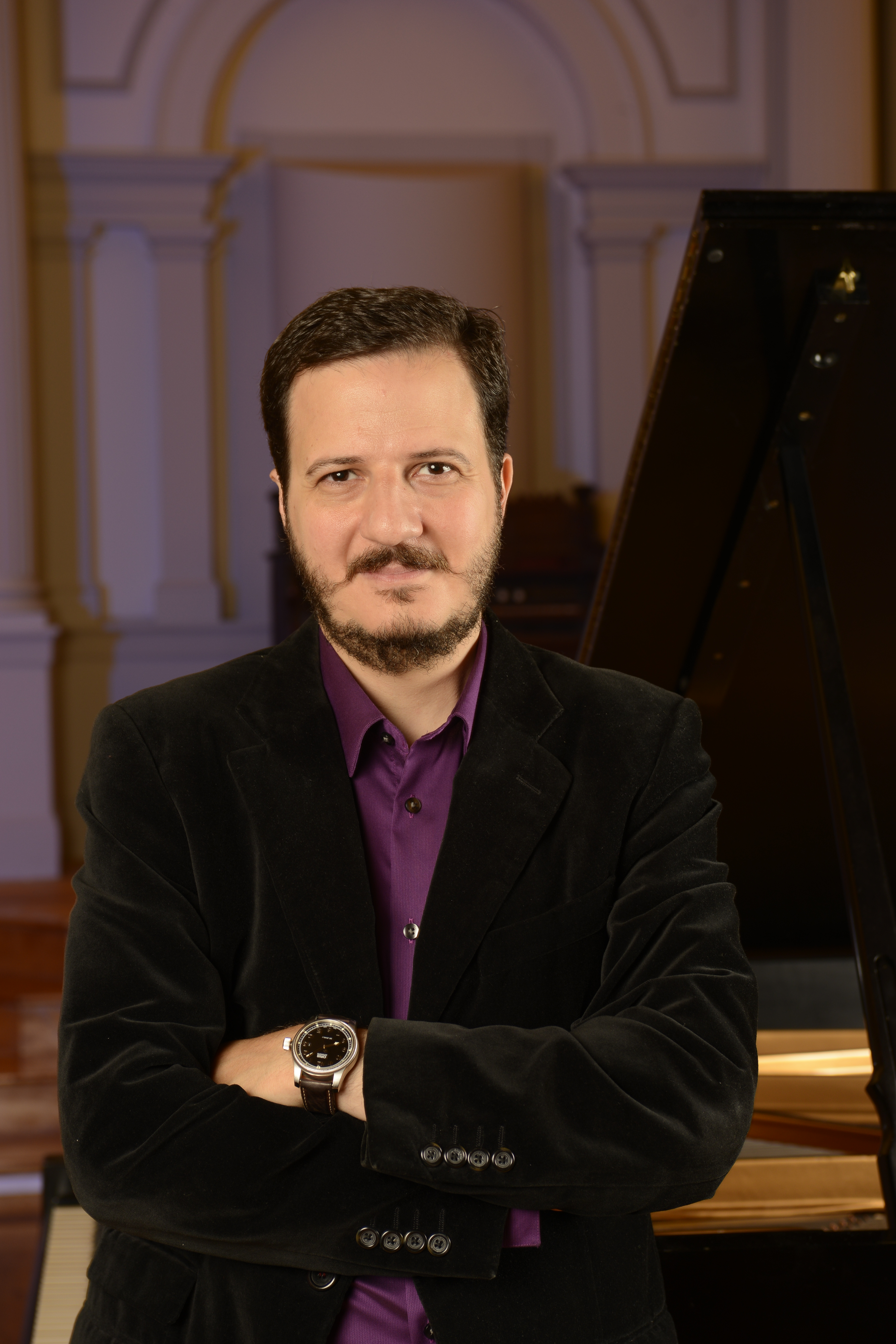
- Mehmet Ali Sanlıkol (2014)
- Born: 24 September 1974 (age 51); Istanbul, Turkey
- Occupations: Composer, performer, scholar
- Parent(s): Hüseyin Parkan Sanlıkol; Fethiye Sanlıkol
- Website: www.sanlikol.com

Mehmet Ali Sanlıkol (born September 24, 1974) is a Turkish and American composer. and CMES Harvard University fellow (2013–15) He is a jazz pianist and singer that also performs a number of Near and Middle Eastern instruments as well as the keyboardless synthesizer Continuum Fingerboard and the SANLIKOL Renaissance 17, a digital microtonal keyboard designed and conceived by himself.

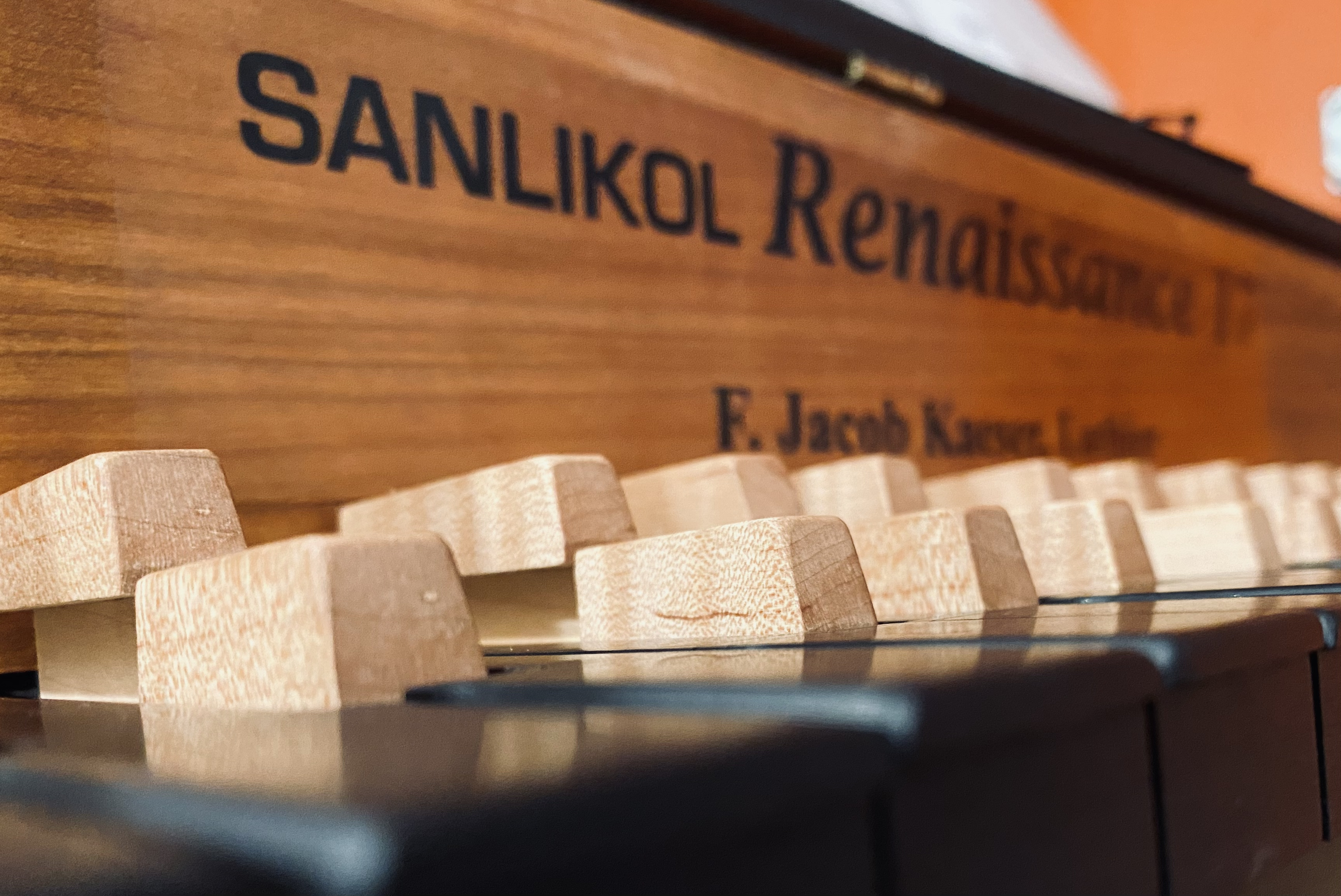
SANLIKOL Renaissance 17, a digital microtonal keyboard conceived and designed by Mehmet Ali Sanlıkol

The Boston Globe calls Sanlıkol's music "colorful, fanciful, full of rhythmic life, and full of feeling" and "not touristy, but rather sophisticated, informed, internalized", "...and he (Sanlıkol) is another who could play decisive role in music’s future in the world." He is a full-time faculty member at the New England Conservatory (NEC). He is also the director of the Intercultural Institute at NEC and the project director/curator of Nilüfer Municipality Dr. Hüseyin Parkan Sanlıkol Musical Instruments Museum.

== Biography ==
=== Early life ===
The son of two Turkish Cypriots, Mehmet Ali Sanlıkol was born in Istanbul, Turkey. His father, Hüseyin Parkan Sanlıkol, was a medical doctor who got appointed by the state to a hospital in Bursa, Turkey to where the family moved in 1975. He studied western classical piano with his mother Fethiye Sanlıkol and started giving piano recitals as early as age five. After studying the first year of middle school in Cyprus Sanlıkol returned to Bursa. Throughout his teenage years he played keyboards in progressive rock bands and participated in rock festivals in Bursa along with Şebnem Ferah and Tarkan Gözübüyük.

=== Education ===
Sanlıkol moved to Istanbul in the Fall of 1992 and studied with Turkish composer/jazz pianist Aydın Esen for about a year after which he won a scholarship to Berklee College of Music. While at Berklee Sanlıkol studied jazz composition with accomplished composers such as Herb Pomeroy and Ken Pullig. He graduated from Berklee with a dual degree in Jazz composition and Film Scoring in 1997, and completed a master's degree in Jazz Studies at New England Conservatory in 2000. After studying with composers George Russell, Bob Brookmeyer, and Lee Hyla, Sanlıkol completed a Doctor of Musical Arts degree at New England Conservatory in 2004 .

=== Career ===
Sanlıkol formed his first 8-piece jazz band with the support of Berklee College of Music and toured Turkey in 1996 as "Mehmet Ali Sanlıkol and the Berklee Band". In 1997 he co-founded the electric jazz band "AudioFact" with Onur Türkmen. Between 1997 and 2003 AudioFact performed numerous times at distinguished clubs and festivals in the US, South America, Europe and Turkey including Blue Note Jazz Club in NY, Ryles Jazz Club in Boston, Oliverio Jazz Club in Buenos Aires, Istanbul International Jazz Festival, İzmir European Jazz Festival, International Ankara Music Festival and International Bursa Music Festival. AudioFact also released two albums in 1998 and 2003 in which they featured Bob Brookmeyer, Tiger Okoshi, Okay Temiz and Ercan Irmak.

In 2002 Sanlıkol received his first major commission to write a piece for PALS children's chorus with a soprano and tenor accompanied by Turkish instruments and a chamber ensemble. The resulting piece was a cantata, entitled Ergenekon: an ancient Turkish legend. While this piece's premiere was successful, beginning in late 2000 Sanlıkol had already shifted his focus toward extensively studying a wide range of Turkish and related musical traditions of which he knew very little since he grew up with European and American musics in his household. The discovery and exploration of his roots prompted him in helping find the non-profit organization DÜNYA based in Boston, Massachusetts along with Robert Labaree and his wife, Serap Kantarcı Sanlıkol in late 2003. Sanlıkol is the president of DÜNYA, a musicians’ collective and a record label, dedicated to exploring a cosmopolitan view of the world through the lens of a wide range of Turkish traditions, alone and in conversation with other world traditions. The unique nature of DÜNYA resulted in Mehmet Ali Sanlıkol going on the air numerous times on NPR and PRI as well as repeated coverage by the press.

While studying Turkish and related regional traditional musics Sanlıkol continued experimenting with newer ways of combining his acquired musical languages. A second cantata written for PALS children's chorus accompanied by a tenor, Turkish instruments and a chamber ensemble, entitled Keloğlan: The Bald Boy and His Magic Lute, was one such follow-up attempt in 2007. However, Sanlıkol's permanent return to composition of concert music and jazz occurred in late 2011 when he was commissioned by American Islamic Congress to compose a piece for jazz combo infused with Turkish instruments that was inspired by his own story of self-discovery about coming to learn Turkish music and culture in the United States. This was followed by commissions from A Far Cry string orchestra, the Boston Cello Quartet and Carnegie Hall which led to premieres and performances at respected venues including Ozawa Hall at Tanglewood, Isabella Stewart Gardner Museum and Zankel Hall at Carnegie Hall by American Composers Orchestra. Since then Sanlıkol has been getting commissioned by respected organizations including the Jazz Educators Network, Yarlung Records and the Bursa State Symphony Orchestra among others.

His “coffeehouse opera”, Othello in the Seraglio: The Tragedy of Sümbül the Black Eunuch, combines elements of Baroque European and Ottoman Turkish music traditions. The work incorporates music from 16th- and 17th-century European and Turkish sources alongside original compositions by Mehmet Ali Sanlıkol, and is performed using both European period instruments and traditional Turkish instruments. According to the production’s organizers, it was performed 14 times within 18 months of its premiere.

Sanlıkol's first jazz orchestra album was JAZZIZ magazine's Top 10 Critics’ Choice 2014 pick, his second jazz orchestra album was DownBeat magazine's September 2016 Editor's Pick, "The Rise Up", commissioned by NEA Jazz Master Dave Liebman, received a 4 star review from The Financial Times, his trio album "An Elegant Ritual" was listed among JAZZIZ's Top 10 July 2021 albums, and his latest jazz orchestra album "Turkish Hipster" was included in NPR's Jazz Night in America month of July list. He has composed for, performed and toured with international stars and ensembles such as Dave Liebman, Billy Cobham, Bob Brookmeyer, Anat Cohen, Antonio Sanchez, Tiger Okoshi, Miguel Zenón, John Patitucci, Gil Goldstein, Esperanza Spalding, Boston Camerata, A Far Cry string orchestra, American Composers Orchestra, Boston Cello Quartet, Erkan Oğur and Birol Yayla. Sanlıkol actively delivers papers and talks at academic conferences such as International Conference on Analytical Approaches to World Music and Society for Ethnomusicology and, his first book, entitled The Musician Mehters, about the organization and the music of the Ottoman Janissary Bands has been published during 2011 in English by The ISIS press and in Turkish by Yapı Kredi Publications. His second book, entitled Reform, Notation and Ottoman music in Early 19th Century Istanbul: EUTERPE, was published by Routledge in 2023

=== Musical Instruments Museum ===
Sanlıkol's father, Parkan Sanlıkol was a collector of musical instruments who had about 300 instruments in his possession at the time of his passing in 2015. Parkan Sanlıkol had also convinced the mayor of Nilüfer, Bursa in Turkey to open a musical instruments museum as partners right before he passed. Coincidentally, between the years of 2011–12, Mehmet Ali Sanlıkol was hired as a consultant to help curate the Turkey exhibit at the musical instruments museum (MIM) in Phoenix, Arizona. Shortly after, Mehmet worked on several projects with the Boston Museum of Fine Arts' musical instruments collection as well as Houston Museum of Fine Arts' musical instruments collection. After Parkan Sanlıkol's passing Mehmet became the project director and the curator of what eventually became the "Nilüfer Municipality Dr. Hüseyin Parkan Sanlıkol Musical Instruments Museum" (MIM). With little restoration work and some strategic new purchases, the museum was able to present a diverse collection to visitors when it officially opened in August of 2021. More recently, the New England Conservatory (NEC) donated 52 historical instruments to MEM from their collection which had been started to be compiled by the founder of the school, Eben Tourjee (1834–1891) whose desire was to create a similar collection to those found in conservatoires in Paris, Brussels and Berlin in the late 19th century. The transportation of this highly valuable cargo was sponsored by Turkish Airlines with whom Sanlıkol partnered and created a short video which can be seen here: Melodies Connecting Continents Turkish Cargo The NEC exhibit was opened on February 17, 2024.

== Personal life ==
Mehmet Ali Sanlıkol has been living in Boston, MA since 1993 and is married to Serap Kantarcı Sanlıkol. The couple has a daughter, Suzan Selin Sanlıkol, born in 2006.

== Awards/Distinctions ==
- New Music USA Creator Fund Grant, 2024
- Grammy award nomination with A Far Cry string orchestra, 2023
- Massachusetts Cultural Council Festivals & Projects Grant, 2023
- South Arts Jazz Road Creative Residency Grant, 2021
- Massachusetts Cultural Council Traditional Artist Apprenticeships Master Artist, 2021 & 2022
- New Music USA Project Grant, 2020
- The Aaron Copland Fund for Music Recording Program Grant, 2020
- Live Arts Boston Grant from The Boston Foundation, 2020
- The American Turkish Society Moon & Stars Project Grant, 2020
- Massachusetts Cultural Council Artist Fellowship Finalist, 2019
- Live Arts Boston Grant from The Boston Foundation, 2019
- TEDx Talk, 2019
- Live Arts Boston Grant from The Boston Foundation, 2018
- Creative City Grant from New England England Foundation for the Arts, 2017
- The Aaron Copland Fund for Music Performance Program Grant, 2016
- Paul R. Judy Center for Applied Research Grant from Eastman School of Music, 2015
- Grammy award nomination with A Far Cry string orchestra, 2014
- Associate of the Music Department designation at Harvard University, 2013
- Fellowship in Turkish Culture and Art granted by Turkish Cultural Foundation, 2012
- Clare Fischer Award from the Professional Writing Division of Berklee College of Music, 1997

== Music ==
=== Full Orchestra ===
- Karagöz Orient Ekspresinde (Karagöz on the Orient Express): esrarengiz bir müzikli komedi (a mysterious musical comedy) (2020) - tenor & jazz piano trio with orchestra
- Harabat/The Intoxicated (2015) - tenor & oud with orchestra
- Symphonia Phrygia: a liturgical drama – Symphony No. 1 (2004) – Byzantine and Western choir with orchestra

=== String Orchestra ===
- A Gentleman of Istanbul: Symphony for Strings, Percussion, Piano, Oud, Ney & Tenor (2018)
- Vecd (2012)

=== Opera ===
- Othello in the Seraglio: The tragedy of Sümbül the black eunuch (2015) – a "Coffeehouse Opera" in 2 Acts composed for 4 singers and chamber ensemble featuring European period instruments, Turkish instruments and an actor

=== Choral ===
- The Triumph – in 5 movements: I. "Kainat" (The Universe), II. "Sır" (The Mystery), III. "Tecella" (The Revelation), IV. "Kenz" (The Treasure), V. "Fetih" (The Triumph) (2024) – choir, ney, bowed tanbur and percussion
- Devran – in 2 movements: I. “Ey gönül neylersin sen bu cihanı”, II. “Mevlan senin aşıkların devran iderler Hu ile” (2017)
- Şu yalan dünya (2015) – tenor, choir and piano
- Mukabele – in 3 movements: I. “Niyaz”, II. “Meydan”, III. “Sema” (2014)
- Çayda çıra [re-composed folk song] (1998) – choir and piano

For Children's Choir:

- Keloğlan: The Bald boy and his magic lute (2007) – children's choir, tenor and mixed chamber ensemble with Turkish instruments
- Ergenekon: An Ancient Turkish legend (2002) – children's choir, tenor, soprano and mixed chamber ensemble with Turkish instruments

=== Chamber ===
- Hikayet-i Muhacir (The Tale of an Immigrant) – in 5 movements: I. Terk-i Diyar / Abandonment, II. Şüphe / Doubt 1, III. Halden Hale / Adaptation, IV. Şüphe / Doubt 2, V. Müntesib-i Dü Cihan / Belonging (2025) – violin and piano
- Songs of the Conjurer – in 3 movements: I. Longa "1850", II. Şarkı "1900", III. Bolero "1950" (2024) – alto saxophone and piano
- كن (KÛN): 7 vignettes portraying the creation according to Islam – in 7 movements: 1. Nur, 2. Kûn, 3. Eflâk, 4. Anâsır, 5. Mevâlid, 6. İnsan, 7. Hû (2021) – violin and piano
- Byzantium (2008) – large chamber ensemble
- Misterioso (1999) – clarinet in Bb and piano
- A Princess who is in love with the color purple – in 2 movements (1998) – flute and piano

=== String Quartet ===
- The Demons and Humans of Siyah-Kalem – in 4 movements: I. "Fasl-ı İblis/Feast of the Demons", II. "Bir Ailenin Hikayesi/The Story of a Family", III. "Sitemkar İblis/A Reproachful Demon", IV. "Sohbet-i Sefil/Conversation of the Miserable" (2024)

With Chamber Organ:

- Sinfonia Ottomana in D minor – in 3 movements: I. Allegro moderato alla Pişrev, II. Adagio alla Murabba, III. Allegro alla Semai (2026)

=== Cello Quartet ===
- The Blue Typhoon (2014)

=== Jazz Orchestra ===
- Microtonal Bop (2026)
- From the 7 Hills of New Rome to the City upon a Hill (2023)
- On the edge of the extreme possible (2000)
- What’s next? (1998)
- N.O.H.A. (1997)
- Kozan March [folk song arr.] (1997)

With Soloist:

- Echoes from a Forgotten Past (2025) – jazz orchestra, zurna, ney and mehter percussion
- Times of the Turtledove (2022) – jazz orchestra, alto saxophone & vibraphone
- A Capoeira Turca (Baia Havası) (2022) – jazz orchestra and clarinet in Bb
- Abraham Suite (2021) – 3 movements: I. The Fire, II. The Sacrifice, III. The Call – jazz orchestra, zurna, duduk, ney and voice
- The Rise Up (2019) – 9 movements: I. RUMI: 1. The Sun of Tabriz 2. A Vicious Murder 3. Rumi's Solitude II. SEPHARDIM: 4. Spain, 1492 5. Temmuz 6. A New Land, A New Music III. SİNAN: 7. A Confrontation in Anatolia 8. Rise thru the Barracks 9. The Owl Song – expanded jazz orchestra and soprano saxophone
- Temmuz (2017) – jazz orchestra, zurna, ney and voice
- The Turkish 2nd Line/New Orleans Çiftetellisi (2015) – jazz orchestra and clarinet in Bb
- Concerto for Soprano Saxophone and Jazz Orchestra in C – 3 movements: I. Medium Funk “Rebellion”, II. Ballad “Reminiscence”, III. Up-tempo Swing “Resolution” (2015)

=== Jazz Combo ===
- Better stay home (1999)
- Gone crazy: a noir fantasy (1996)
- The Blue soul of Turkoromero (1996)

With Turkish Instruments:

- Suite in 3 movements as part of "Abraham": I. The Fire, II. The Sacrifice, III. The Call (2019)
- A Jazzed up Devr-i Revan (2014)
- An Afro Semai (2012)
- Palindrome (2012)

With a Solo Instrument and/or Voice:

- A Dream in Nihavend (2014) – featuring the Continuum Fingerboard
- Whirl around (2003)
- A Violet longing (1996)

=== Jazz Quintet/Quartet/Trio/Duo ===
- The Funky R17 (2025) – featuring the SANLIKOL Renaissance 17
- No Big Deal (2025)
- Pickin' A Shuffle Alla Turca (2025)
- Another Dream in Nihavend (2025)
- One Melancholic Montuno (2024)
- A Children's Song (for our mothers) [arr.] (2024)
- Hüseyni Jam [folk song arr.] (2022) – featuring the SANLIKOL Renaissance 17
- Cloudy with a chance of funk (2020)
- In Search/Arayış (2019)
- An Elegant ritual (2017)
- 6 Months from now (2017)
- Talk about a Turkish Blues (2015)
- Şedd-i Araban Şarkı (2011) – featuring the SANLIKOL Renaissance 17
- Umut/Hope (2009)
- Buselik (2004)
- Hasret: Anadolu Jazz (2003)
- Lost inside (2002)
- The 7th day (2002)
- Dere geliyor dere [re-composed folk song] (2000)
- Jasmine (1999)
- Mr. Downtown (1999)
- Dillirga [folk song arr.] (1997)
- Can’t put you aside (1996)
- King of Boston (1996)
- Tribal joke (1996)
- My Blues (1995)
- Black dance (1995)
- Hearing Africa (1995)

=== Hybrid Ensembles ===
- EΣרI☼ (2020) – ney, duduk, trumpet in Bb, tenor, nipple gongs and rhythm section
- Şehadet (2011) – alto, baritone, bowed tanbur, sackbut and bass
- A Sultaniyegah Fantasy (2011) – ney, kemençe, viola da gamba and bass recorder
- A Kürdilihicazkar Canon for sackbut and voice (2011)
- Rast Fantezi (2010) – 3 zurnas, 2 clarinets in Bb, 3 trumpets in Bb, French horn, trombone, tuba, 2 nekkares, 2 bass drums, 2 cymbals and kös
- Rast Naat (2009) – tenor, soprano, rebab, bowed tanbur, sackbut and flugel horn
- Merhaba (2006) – 2 tenors, sackbut and bowed tanbur
- Ben bir acep ile geldim (2004) – alto, baritone, trumpet in Bb, sackbut, bowed tanbur, oud, bass and percussion
- Ottomanist (2001) – 3 zurnas, 2 clarinets in Bb, 3 trumpets in Bb, French horn, trombone, 2 nekkares, 2 bass drums, 2 cymbals and kös
- Buselik Canon (2001) – soprano, tenor, bowed tanbur, sackbut, keyboard, bass and percussion
- Rast Peşrev (2001) – ney, clarinet in Bb, oboe, 2 trumpets in Bb, trombone, French horn, kudüm, daire and kös

=== Classical Ottoman/Turkish Music ===
- Pencgah Peşrev (2008)
- Beyati Peşrev “Hanım Sultan Peşrevi” (2004)
- Nihavend Semai (2003)

With Voices:

- Nefes, Deyiş & İlahi (2005)

=== Pop Music ===
- (This is) The Boston beat (2020)
- Estarabim [arr.] (2017)
- Gel gönül gurbete gitme (2008)
- Hatam ne? / Where did I go wrong? (1996)
- Aşkı öğrendim senden / From you I learned what love is (1996)

== Selected discography ==
- THE ELECTRIC OUD MAN SPEAKS and you listen... (Dünya, 2026)
- 7 Shades of Melancholia (Dünya, 2025)
- An Elegant Ritual (Dünya, 2021)

=== Albums with Mehmet Ali Sanlıkol & Whatsnext? ===
- Turkish Hipster (Dünya, 2023)
- The Rise Up (Dünya, 2020)
- Resolution (Dünya, 2016)
- Whatsnext? (Dünya, 2014)

=== Albums with AudioFact ===
- Asitane (Aura/EMI, 2003)
- Black Spot (Kalan, 1998)

=== Albums with various DÜNYA ensembles ===
- A Sacred Music Celebration: Greek Orthodoxy and Turkish Sufism (Dünya, 2011)
- A Story of The City: Constantinople, Istanbul (Dünya, 2011)
- Dünya Size Güller Bize/For You The World, For Us The Roses (Dünya, 2009)
- Kuş Dili: The Language of Birds (Dünya, 2008)
- Lale Ve Kılıç/The Tulip and The Sword (Dünya, 2007)
- Music of Cyprus (Dünya/Kalan, 2007)
- The Psalms of Ali Ufki (Dünya, 2006)
- Come see what love has done to me (Dünya, 2005)

=== Album with Crier Records ===
- A Gentleman of Istanbul: Symphony for Strings, Percussion, Piano, Oud, Ney & Tenor (Crier Records, 2023)

=== Album with Blue Heron ===
- Lessons from Nightingales: Songs of Sufi Mysteries (Blue Heron, 2025)

=== Album with Shanti Records ===
- Abraham: Music for Three Faiths (feat. Jazzaar Global Ensemble & Billy Cobham) (Shanti, 2019)

=== Singles ===
- Talk About A Turkish Blues (Dünya, 2024)
- (This is) The Boston Beat (Dünya, 2021)
- Hatam Ne?/Where Did I Go Wrong? (Dünya, 2014)

=== Concert DVDs ===
- Wisdom and Turkish Humor (Dünya, 2007)

=== Films ===
- Othello in the Seraglio (Dünya, 2019)

=== Documentary films ===
- What a World (Dünya, 2014)
