= Fred Irby III =

American jazz musician

Fred Irby III is an American jazz professor, music director and trumpeter. He is a professor of music at Howard University in Washington, DC and the director of the Howard University Jazz Ensemble (HUJE).

== Career ==
Irby is from Mobile, Alabama and holds degrees from Grambling State University and Southern Illinois University. He is a professor of music at Howard University in Washington, DC, where he has taught since 1974, and the director of the Howard University Jazz Ensemble (HUJE). Under his direction the HUJE has toured internationally and has 41 recordings. He is also Principal Trumpet of the Kennedy Center Opera House Musical Theater Orchestra. He holds active membership of many music associations and orchestras.

== Performances ==
Major orchestral performances in which Irby has taken part include the Twentieth Century Fox movie Alvin and the Chipmunks, the ABC-TV show Dancing with the Stars, the NBC-TV show America's Got Talent, the 56th Primetime Emmy Awards, the 87th, 88th and 89th Academy Awards Gala (OSCARS), the Kennedy Center Honors Gala, and the Christmas in Washington Gala.

== Commissions ==
He has commissioned and premiered compositions by two eminent African American composers: TROMBA: Suite for B Flat Trumpet and Piano by Ulysses S. Kay; and Spiritual Fantasy #1 for Piccolo Trumpet and Piano by Frederick Tillis.

== Awards ==
Irby received the 2008 Downbeat magazine Achievement Award In Jazz Education, and in 2008 was inducted into the Grambling State University Alumni Hall of Fame. He received the Disney Performing Arts Award for Excellence in Teaching Jazz in 2009 at the MENC Teaching Music Awards ceremony, and was designated a Lowell Mason Fellow in 2010. In 2016, he received the Ronnie Wells Jazz Service Award at the Mid-Atlantic Jazz Festival, the DC Jazz Festival awarded him a Lifetime Achievement Award at their 2016 Gala at the Kennedy Center and he was inducted into the Southern Illinois University at Edwardsville Alumni Hall of Fame.
