= Frederick Irby =

Frederick Irby may refer to:

- Frederick Paul Irby (1779–1844), British Royal Navy officer
- Frederick Irby, 2nd Baron Boston (1749–1825) of the Irby Baronets
- Fred Irby III, American jazz professor, music director and trumpeter
