= George Letellier =

American jazz pianist and composer (born 1957)

George Letellier (born October 11, 1957) is an American jazz pianist and composer, currently living in Luxembourg.

== Biography ==
After attending the Berklee College of Music in Boston in 1975, in 1976 he wrote his first compositions and arrangements and began as a pianist playing in warm-up bands for artists such as Phil Woods, Gary Burton, and Steve Swallow. After returning to Berklee in 1983 and graduating in 1985 with a Superior Prix in Film Music Composition, he moved to San Francisco, California and from 1986 until 1990 worked as a freelance pianist in the jazz and salsa genre. His successful session work attracted film executives and he was hired to compose music for films and corporate videos. In 1987 he served as a music editor on the Academy Award-nominated short film Liru, and in 1988 in Oakland, California, established a film production company where he worked not only as a composer but producer.

In 1991, Letellier moved to Portugal, accepting a job offer as a professor of composition in Porto. There he composed two ballets and was a session musician, supporting acts such as the chamber music ensemble Novanguarde, and the Raul Marques E Os Amigos Da Salsa ensemble. In 1992, Letellier collaborated with saxophonist Mario Santos and formed the successful George Letellier Quartet which toured all across Portugal.

In 1995, George Letellier relocated to Luxembourg and began working as music composer for such institutions such as the BCEE; Paul Wurth Corporation; Tango Television; Big Band Spectrum; Opus 78 Big Band, as well as his session work and private lessons. With the Opus 78 Big Band, he collaborated in arranging the tunes of Frank Sinatra and turning them into large philharmonic ensembles for performing.

From 1997 until 2003, Letellier served as was the Director of Jazz Studies at the Esch Conservatoire and wrote three publications on jazz theory between 1997 and 1999. In 1997, he formed the original Consabora Salsa Orchestra with Harri Jokiharra, and they later became known as Salsabor. In 2001 he worked with Sascha Ley to arrange and perform Lost In The Stars by Kurt Weill, putting on a number of performances including at the Luxembourg Embassy in Berlin in September 2003.

Since 2001, Letellier has taught jazz at L'Ecole de Musique in Echternach. He continues to function as a session pianist, and has performed in hundreds of jazz concerts and theatrical productions in Luxembourg, the United States (New England, New York, California), Portugal, Spain, Germany, Belgium, Greece, France and India Aside from his jazz compositions he has also composed contemporary and traditional classical chamber music and arrangements for a diversity of musical ensembles.

In 2002, George Letellier co-composed with the famed Luxembourg rocker Serge Tonnar the musical "Alice Under Ground" produced by MASKéNADA which was performed at the Wiltz Festival in the summer of 2002.

In 2007 he performed at the Indigo Jazz and Blues Festival in Bangalore, supporting Sascha Ley in a band composed of himself on piano, Marc Demuth on acoustic bass, Johannes Müller on soprano / tenor sax, Anne Kaftan on soprano sax and bass clarinet and Benoît Martiny on drums.

Since 2005, Letellier has been again involved in motion picture production and editing, and has been writing, directing and producing music videos and short documentaries about local musicians.
