= Cathedral Park Jazz Festival =

Annual event in Portland, Oregon, U.S.

- Frequency: Annually
- Venue: Cathedral Park
- Locations: Portland, Oregon
- Country: United States

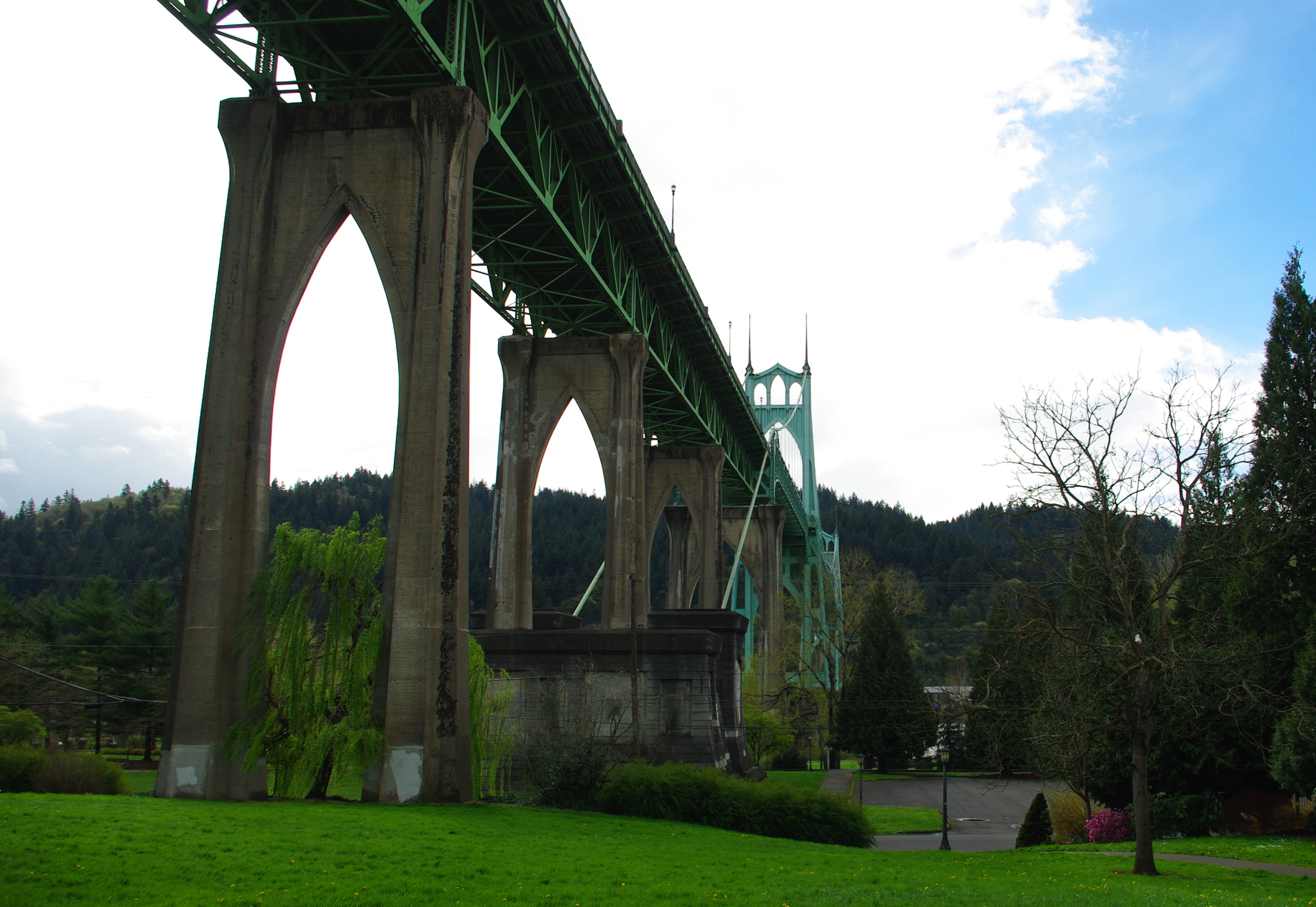
The event takes place under the St. Johns Bridge in Cathedral Park

The Cathedral Park Jazz Festival is an annual jazz festival in Cathedral Park, in the neighborhood of the same name, in Portland, Oregon, United States. Held under the St. Johns Bridge, the event is the longest-running free jazz festival west of the Mississippi River. The event is organized by the Jazz Society of Oregon and has included a beer and wine garden, as well as food carts and other vendors. The 2020 event was held virtually because of the COVID-19 pandemic.

== See also ==
- Culture of Portland, Oregon
- List of festivals in the United States
  - List of music festivals in the United States
- List of jazz festivals
