= The Queen's Cartoonists =

Jazz band from New York City, US

The Queen's Cartoonists is a jazz ensemble from Queens, New York, known for their live performances synchronizing music with animated films. They blend classic and contemporary animation and musical compositions while incorporating classical music, comedy, Foley, and clowning.

== History ==
The band was founded in 2014 by pianist and composer Joel Pierson, who aimed to explore the connection between the Golden Age of animation and the Golden Age of jazz. The initial rehearsal included drummer Rossen Nedelchev, trumpeter Greg Hammontree, clarinetist Mark Phillips, and saxophonist Drew Pitcher. All these musicians resided in Queens, New York, which inspired the band's name.

Pierson's early arrangements included pieces by Raymond Scott, John Kirby, and Carl Stalling. Their inaugural public performance was held on January 30, 2015, at the Sunnyside Concert Series in Sunnyside, Queens.

The band applied for the MTA’s Music Under New York program and relocated their rehearsals to the subway system in 2016.

In the fall of 2022, The Queen’s Cartoonists recorded their first studio album, a re-composition of Mozart’s Requiem titled “Mozart’s Jazz Requiem.”

== Recognition ==
=== 2016 ===
The Queen's Cartoonists gained recognition at the APAP conference in 2016, leading to management by Dow Artists. The band secured theater gigs, expanding their repertoire. In June 2017 the band opened for the New York Philharmonic after winning a competition for the orchestra’s 175th anniversary. The task was to re-interpret Dvorak’s 9th Symphony; the band included all of the major themes of the work in a two-minute swing arrangement.

=== 2018 ===
At the South Arts conference in 2018, CAMI Music's Theresa Vibberts discovered the band, signing them in March 2019. Notable gigs followed, including sold-out shows at New York's Blue Note Jazz Club in September 2019 (a historic first for the club) and a European tour in September 2021, where they sold out six performances at the Konzerthaus Berlin.

=== 2022 ===
In 2022 the band partnered with Aardman Animation on a run at the Edinburgh Fringe Festival, accompanying films starring Wallace & Gromit and Shaun the Sheep. The performances were called “universal and ageless” by Fringe Review and “a rollicking success” by North West End UK.

== Band Members ==
Joel Pierson - piano, compositions

Rossen Nedelchev - drums

Mark Phillips - clarinet, soprano sax, flute

Drew Pitcher - tenor sax, bass clarinet, flute

Greg Hammontree - trumpet, trombone, tuba
