= Django à Liberchies =

Coordinates: 50.500°N 4.417°E

Django @ Liberchies is a gypsy jazz festival, taking place every May since 2003 in Liberchies (Pont-à-Celles, Belgium), in honour of Django Reinhardt.

== See also ==
- List of jazz festivals
