= Tobago Jazz Festival =

- Genre: Jazz
- Dates: April 24-26
- Location: Trinidad and Tobago
- Years active: 2004-Present
- Website: http://tobagojazz.ttfilmfestival.com/

The Tobago Jazz Festival is a music festival held every summer at Plymouth in Trinidad and Tobago which according to the Tourism Minister attracted over 20,000 visitors to Tobago.

== History ==
The Jazz Festival was first held in 2004 but it was postponed in 2009, as the 2008 show costed $50 million, but ticket sales only yielded $17 million. A new company sponsored the 2010 Jazz festival, which saw a line-up including Carlos Santana, Gloria Estefan, Celine Dion, Tina Turner and Neil Diamond

== 2017 Jazz festival ==
Notable performers include Grace Jones, Shabba Ranks, and D’Angelo. Additionally, for the first time, a film component was added to the Festival, in collaboration with the T&T Film Festival.

== See also ==
- List of jazz festivals
- List of historic jazz festivals
