= Blue Note Jazz Festival =

The Blue Note Jazz Festival is an annual jazz festival that takes place in June in various venues across New York City. Hosted by the Blue Note Jazz Club, the festival features performances by renowned jazz artists who have been integral to the Blue Note Jazz Club or to jazz music in general. The inaugural festival took place on June 1, 2011, to commemorate the 30th anniversary of the Blue Note Jazz Club in New York City. In the course of one month, the festival featured over 80 performances in 15 different venues.

== Venues ==
The Blue Note Jazz Festival is held in some of the most prominent music venues in New York City. The festival is primarily held in the venues operated by the Blue Note Entertainment Group, the Blue Note Jazz Club and Sony Hall, and formerly the Highline Ballroom and B.B. King's Blues Club. However, performances have also been held in other notable establishments including Le Poisson Rouge, Mercury Lounge, the Katonah Museum of Art, the Beacon Theatre, the Town Hall, Terminal 5, and Central Park SummerStage.

== Performers ==
=== 2011 ===
Chris Botti, McCoy Tyner, Dave Brubeck, Brian Wilson, Bobby McFerrin, Chaka Khan, Lee Konitz, Bill Frisell, Dave Holland, Chris Potter, Gary Peacock.

=== 2012 ===
McCoy Tyner, Charles Tolliver, Lou Donaldson, Arturo Sandoval, Béla Fleck, Cassandra Wilson, Jerry Douglas, the James Carter Organ Trio, Michel Camilo, Stanley Clarke, and George Duke.

=== 2013 ===
Buffy Sainte-Marie, Chris Rob, The Hot Sardines, Dave Liebman, The Manhattan Transfer

=== 2015 ===
Buika, Natalie Cole, Buddy Guy, Abdullah Ibrahim

== See also ==
- List of jazz festivals
