= French Quarter Festival =

Annual music festival in New Orleans, Louisiana, U.S.

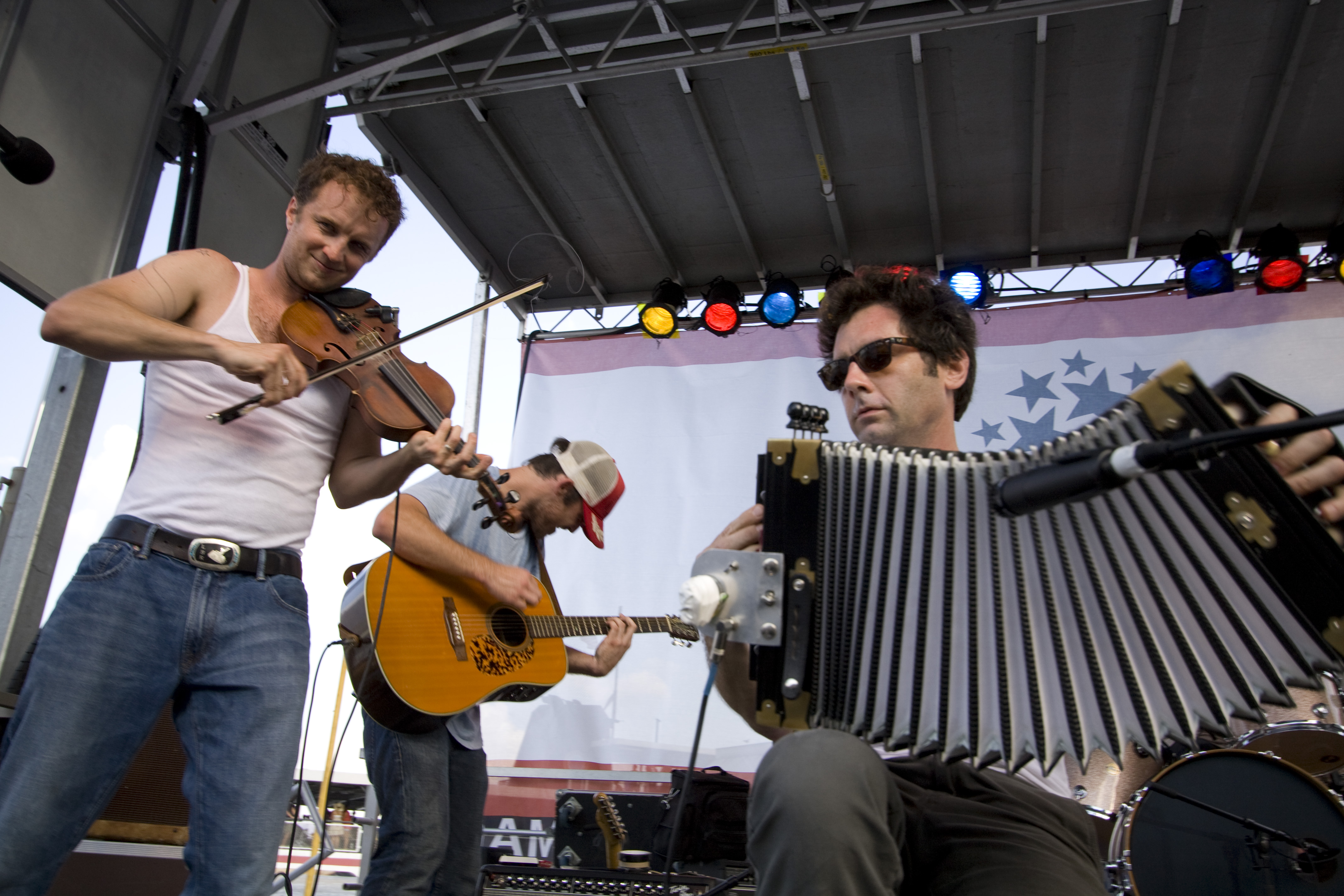
Lost Bayou Ramblers at the French Quarter Festival

French Quarter Festival (FQF) is a free, annual music festival held in early April, located in the historic French Quarter of New Orleans, Louisiana. Founded in 1983 with the first festival held in 1984, the festival features primarily New Orleans music, such as jazz, blues, and zydeco from hundreds of local musicians, as well as food from dozens of New Orleans restaurants.

In April 2008, jazz pianist Ronnie Kole (1931–2020) recalled the origins of the idea of creating a new event in New Orleans. In the early 1980s, the Mayor's office recruited ten people, nine business owners and one musician, to put together a new festival for the city. With an estimated attendance of over 800,000 in 2019, the festival bills itself as "the world's largest showcase of Louisiana music." In 2020 and 2021, however, the event was cancelled in light of the COVID-19 pandemic, with hope for a return in April 2022.

During French Quarter Festival, more than 20 stages throughout the French Quarter perform local music and represent genres from traditional and contemporary jazz to R&B, New Orleans funk, brass bands, folk, gospel, Latin, Zydeco, classical, cabaret, and international.

As of 2021, French Quarter Festival, Satchmo Summerfest, and Holidays New Orleans Style are formally overseen by the nonprofit French Quarter Festivals, Inc., which as of 2017 is led by CEO Emily Madero. In February 2022, French Quarter Festival announced a return in April 2022. The 2022 event took place on April 21–24, 2022.

== See also ==
- List of jazz festivals
- Satchmo SummerFest
- Mardi Gras in New Orleans
