= Port-au-Prince International Jazz Festival =

- Genre: Jazz
- Dates: Varies
- Locations: Port-au-Prince, Haiti
- Years active: 2007–present
- Website: papjazzhaiti.org

The Port-au-Prince International Jazz Festival (French: Festival International de Jazz de Port-au-Prince), also known as PAPJAZZ, is a large annual jazz festival held in Haiti, that features many well-known international jazz musicians, and emphasizes its insistence on true jazz, avoiding other forms of popular music. The event is held at various venues for eight nights.

The first year was 2007. In 2013 it featured Branford Marsalis as a headliner, with their first show in the coastal town of Jacmel. That year featured two dozen other jazz musicians from countries such as Mexico, Brazil, Spain, and Cameroon. According to Billboard, "The festival seeks to promote jazz in Haiti, increase understanding between the Haitian and American cultures, and encourage tourism."

== See also ==
- List of music festivals
- List of jazz festivals
