= Jazz May =

Annual jazz festival

- Genre: Jazz
- Dates: May
- Locations: Penza, Russia
- Years active: 2011–present
- Founders: Alexey Lvov-Belov
- Website: jazzmay.com

The Jazz May is an annual international jazz festival held in Penza, Russia. From its inception the main organizer of the festival has been The Penza State Philharmonic.

== History ==
The Jazz May festival was conceived by Alexey Lvov-Belov, the head of The Penza State Philharmonic (2010–2013) and The Jazz-Cruise Band (2007–2014). First time it was held in 2011, lasted four days. The event was deemed a success, and this helped to make it annual.

In 2014 Oleg Rubtsov who took part in preparation for previous festivals became a major organizer. All the festival's performances were held in a new building of The Penza State Philharmonic, Penza Music Hall and at the square between them. In order to make the square more comfortable for visitors a fundraising was successfully done.

== Festival format and events ==
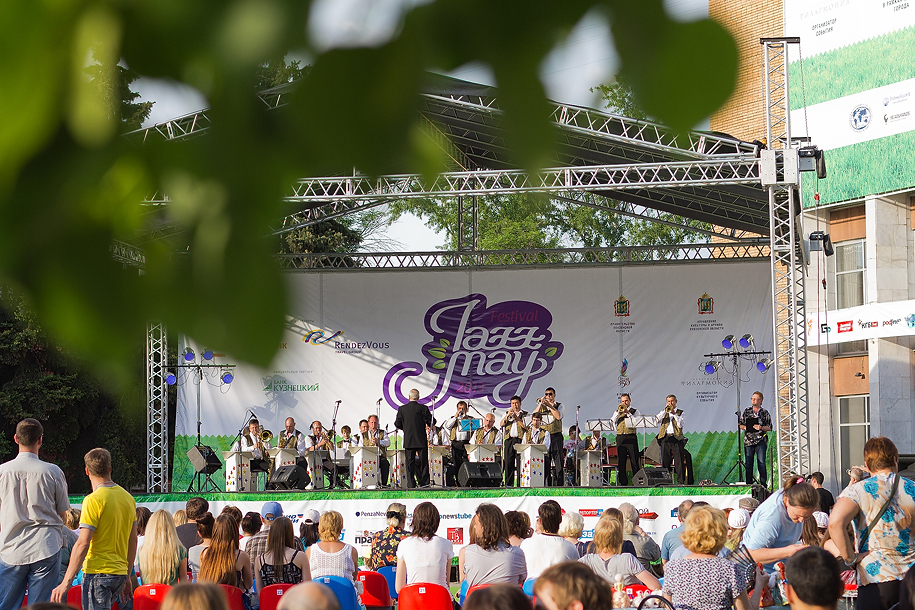
Valery Dmitriev's Big Band (Zaretsny, Russia). Photo by Donatas Dapkus

The idea of the festival is to gather on a stage famous jazz musicians and those who just start their careers.

Festival events

- performances at the music hall and open-air;
- exhibitions of jazz photographers;
- masterclasses, lectures and round-table discussions with festival participants.

== Participants ==
2011

- The Bird's Milk (Penza, Russia)
- Petr Andronov's ensemble (Penza, Russia)
- The Jazz-Cruise (Penza, Russia)
- Valery Dmitriev's Big Band (Zaretsny, Russia)
- Petr Vostokov's ensemble (Moscow, Russia)
- Zoryana Farhutdinova with The Tanslu (Moscow, Russia)
- Alexey Kolosov with The Aura (Moscow, Russia)
- Sergey Chipenko with The Trans-Atlantic Band (Moscow, Russia)
- Dominique Bukovsky (Poland)
- Gzhegozh Syich (Poland)
- Fabio Constantino (Italy)

2012

- The Exclusive Jazz (Penza, Russia)
- The Crossroad (Penza, Russia)
- The МыSTEREO (Penza, Russia)
- My Jazz Trio (Penza, Russia)

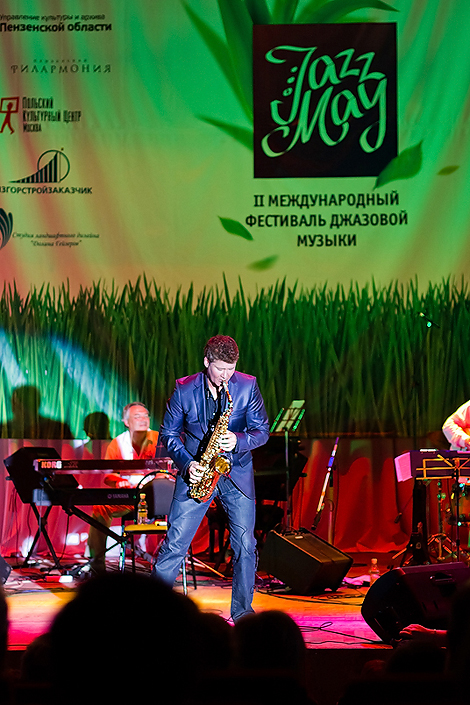
Michael Lington (USA). Photo by Donatas Dapkus

- The Jazz-Cruise (Penza, Russia)
- Valery Dmitriev's Big Band (Zaretsny, Russia)
- Sergey Belgisov with The Street Life (Saratov, Russia)
- Evgeniy Surmenev's ensemble (Saratov, Russia)
- Alexey Kolosov with The Aura (Moscow, Russia)
- Vyacheslav Hanov's quartet (Moscow, Russia)
- Ivan Farmakovsky's trio (Moscow, Russia)
- Sergey Letov with The Willows Gone (Moscow, Russia)
- Yuliana Rogacheva (Moscow, Russia)
- Yuliya Alimova (Moscow, Russia)
- Ekaterina Chernousova with The Rooms (Moscow, Russia)
- Anatoly Kroll's The Academic Band (Moscow, Russia)
- Dominique Bukovsky's trio (Poland)
- The Folkmilch (Austria)
- Michael Lington (USA)
- Kirill Moshkov (Moscow, Russia)

Official photographers - Gulnara Hamatova (Moscow, Russia), Pavel Korbut (Moscow, Russia)

- Vladimir Feyertag (St. Petersburg)

2013

- Petr Andronov's ensemble (Penza, Russia)
- Soldatkina's song ensemble (Penza, Russia)
- The Exclusive Jazz (Penza, Russia)
- The МыSTEREO (Penza, Russia)
- The Jazz-Cruise (Penza, Russia)
- Valery Dmitriev's Big Band (Zaretsny, Russia)
- Juliana Rogacheva (Moscow, Russia)
- Anatoly Kroll's quartet We Are From Jazz (Moscow, Russia)
- Alexandr Titov (Ekaterinburg, Russia)
- Vitaly Vladimirov (Ekaterinburg, Russia)
- Ashat Sayfullin
- Oleg Yangurov with the Funky House Band (Ufa, Russia)
- Rosario Giuliani's quartet (Italy)
- Richie Cole (USA)
- Darrell Green (USA)
- The International Jazz May Band (band from festival participants)

Official photographers - Andrey Scorobogatov (Penza, Russia) and Boris Tishulin (Penza, Russia)

2014

- The Willows Gone (Moscow, Russia)
- The Live People (Moscow, Russia)
- The Cigar Hall (Moscow, Russia)
- Yuri Belonogov's ensemble (ex-Jazz-Cruise Band) (Penza, Russia)
- The Roadside Band (Penza, Russia)
- The МыSTEREO (Penza, Russia)
- The Chance (Penza, Russia)
- Eduard Dmitriev's Big Band of Collage of Culture and Arts (Zaretsny, Russia)
- Valery Dmitriev's Big Band (Zaretsny, Russia)
- Alevtina Polyakova's quartet (Moscow, Russia)
- Oleg Lundstrem Jazz Orchestra (Moscow, Russia)
- Anna Buturlina (Moscow, Russia)
- The Crossroad (Penza, Russia)
- Olesya Yalunina Band (St. Petersburg, Russia)
- Non Cadenza (St. Petersburg, Russia)
- The MosGorTrio (Moscow, Russia)
- Craig Handy (USA)

== Nominations and awards ==
The festival was nominated for 2012 Russian Event Awards and became The Best Cultural Project of the year.

== Intellectual property issue ==
In the early 2013 during the preparation for the regular festival an intellectual property rights conflict took place. Among other things it referred to the Jazz May brand. In the media there was a statement on possibility of making two independent festivals. As a result, there was the only Jazz May but the main organizer (The Penza State Philharmonic) had to change its logo.

== Links ==
- Official website
