= Frederick C. Tillis =

American musician (1930–2020)

- Born: Frederick Charles Tillis; January 5, 1930; Galveston, Texas, United States
- Died: May 3, 2020 (aged 90); Amherst, Massachusetts, United States
- Education: Galveston Central High School
- Alma mater: Wiley College; University of Iowa; University of North Texas College of Music
- Occupations: Composer, professor of music, jazz saxophonist
- Employer: University of Massachusetts Amherst
- Notable work: See below
- Style: Classical music; Twelve-tone technique; Experimental
- Website: www.fredericktillis.com

Frederick Charles Tillis (January 5, 1930 – May 3, 2020) was an American composer, jazz saxophonist, poet, and music educator at the collegiate level.

== Early life ==
=== Growing up ===
Born in Galveston, Texas on January 5, 1930, Frederick Tillis was raised by his mother, Zelma Bernice Gardner, née Tillis (1913–2004), his stepfather, General Gardner, and his maternal grandparents, Willie Tillis and Jessie Tillis-Hubbard (1893–1979).

His first musical experiences were courtesy of his mother, who played piano and sang to him as a child. Later, at George Washington Carver Elementary School, Tillis decided to join the school's drum and bugle corps. As he became more proficient on trumpet, Tillis found his first professional job as a musician in jazz bands when he was twelve years old, earning him the nickname "Baby Tillis". Tillis' band director at Central Side High School, Fleming S. Huff, suggested that he start playing the saxophone.

=== Post-secondary education ===
In 1946, Tillis was accepted at Wiley College on a music scholarship, and thus became the first person in his family to receive a college education. He graduated from Wiley in 1949 with a B.A. in music, accepting the position of college band director there almost immediately. He also married fellow Wiley music major Edna Louise Dillon at this time. They moved from Texas in 1951 so that Tillis could attend the University of Iowa for graduate music studies. At this time, he also decided to volunteer in the United States Air Force at the outbreak of the Korean War, and became director of the 356th Air Force Band. He later went back to get his PhD under the GI Bill at University of North Texas College of Music, but then returned to the University of Iowa to finish his doctoral studies.

== Career as educator and composer ==
Completing his PhD in 1963, Tillis then held a succession of academic positions at Wiley College, Grambling College, and Kentucky State University. In 1970, Dr. Philip Bezanson, his mentor from Iowa and then chair of the UMass music department, recruited Tillis to the faculty of the University of Massachusetts Amherst, and he and his family moved to Massachusetts. Joining the faculty as an associate professor of music, Tillis eventually held many faculty and administrative positions during his tenure at the University of Massachusetts. He retired in 1997, but still held the title of Professor Emeritus in the Department of Music and Dance. Tillis served as Director Emeritus of the University Fine Arts Center and Director of the Jazz in July Workshops in Improvisation at the University of Massachusetts Amherst.

Tillis wrote music since the age of twenty, and was influenced by Schoenberg, Bach, Prokofiev, Mussorgsky, African-American composers, and world music. Some of Tillis' more notable compositions include A Symphony of Songs, a choral/orchestral work based on poems by Wallace Stevens and commissioned by The Hartford Chorale, Inc. (1999); A Festival Journey (1992), and Ring Shout Concerto (1974), for percussion, written for Max Roach; and Concerto for Piano (Jazz Trio) and symphony orchestra (1983) written for Billy Taylor. Tillis also wrote several books of poetry, as well as the textbook Jazz Theory and Improvisation.

== Late life ==
During his retirement years, Dr. Tillis remained active as a composer, poet, touring performer, lecturer, and arts advocate. He maintained his dedicated service as director emeritus of the Fine Arts Center and professor emeritus at the UMass Amherst music department and Jazz in July program well into the mid-2000s. In later life, Tillis suffered from dementia and had multiple people who would care for him in his old age. Despite his health challenges, he remained interested in life and continued to support and be engaged with various arts activates in the surrounding Western Massachusetts community.

== Posthumous honors ==
The outpouring of admiration and acknowledgements for Dr. Tillis and his accomplishments is steadfast. Notable honors include proclamations from both the Commonwealth of Massachusetts Senate and House of Representatives for his 50 years of cultural contributions to music education and arts advocacy in Massachusetts; the naming dedication of the 1,800 seat Fine Arts Center concert hall at the University of Massachusetts Amherst as the Frederick C. Tillis Performance Hall; and finally after restrictions were lifted as the pandemic eased, a major memorial celebration was able to be held on February 20, 2022, produced by the University of Massachusetts Amherst Department of Music and Dance. Performers included current music department faculty and students, former faculty and alumni of the music department, and many friends who collaborated with Dr. Tillis over the years. Additionally, music composed by Frederick Tillis continues to reach new audiences with even more performances, recordings, and recognition.

== Compositions ==
- Autumn Concerto for Trumpet (1979) – Jazz orchestra. Duration: 10 minutes
- The Blue Express (1973) – Jazz orchestra. Duration: 5 minutes
- Blue Stone Differencia (1972) – Jazz orchestra. Duration: 5 minutes
- Brass Quintet (1962) – Duration: 10 minutes. Publisher: New York, General Music. Premiere: 1972; University of Iowa, Iowa City, Iowa. Recording: Serenus 12066 (1976)
- Celebration, Grand March (1966) – Concert band. Duration: ca. 5 minutes 30 seconds. Commissioned by Morehouse College, Atlanta, Georgia. Premiere: 1966; Morehouse College, Atlanta, GA
- Concerto for Piano (1977) – Jazz orchestra. Two parts. Duration: 19 minutes. Premiere: 1977; Fine Arts Center, University of Massachusetts Amherst, Amherst
- Concerto for Piano (1979) – Jazz trio and symphony orchestra. In two parts. Revised 1982. Duration: ca. 20 minutes. Commissioned by Springfield Symphony Orchestra. Written for Billy Taylor. Publisher: New York, Composer Facsimile Edition
- Concerto for Trio Pro Viva And Orchestra (1980) – Flute, violoncello, piano, and orchestra. Duration: 21 minutes 7 seconds. Commissioned by the Richmond Symphony Orchestra.
- The Cotton Curtain (1966) – Orchestra. Duration: 4 minutes 45 seconds. Publisher: New York, Composer Facsimile Edition. NOTE: Written for student orchestra.
- Designs for Orchestra, Nos. 1 and 2 (1963) – Duration: No. 1 ca. 7 minutes; No. 2 ca. 5 minutes 30 seconds. Publisher: New York, Composer Facsimile Edition. Premiere: 1968; Atlanta, Georgia; Atlanta Symphony Orchestra. NOTE: Ph.D. Dissertation; abstract in Dissertation Abstracts XXIX, 6, 2513. Can be performed separately
- Elegy (1983) – Jazz orchestra. Duration: 5 minutes 6 seconds. Commissioned by the Howard University Jazz Ensemble
- Fantasy on a Theme by Julian Adderley (A Little Taste) (1975) – Jazz orchestra. Duration: 10 minutes. Premiere: 4 November 1975; Amherst, Massachusetts; University of Massachusetts Amherst Jazz Workshop.
- Five Spirituals for Chorus and Brass Choir (1976) – Contents: 1. I'm Gonna Sing; 2. The Urgency; 3. Salve Savage in the Spin; 4. All About Are the Cold Places; 5. The Time. Duration: ca. 20 minutes. Text by Gwendolyn Brooks. Commissioned by the University of Massachusetts Amherst Choral. Publisher: New York, Composers Facsimile Edition. Premiere (Nos. 1, 3, 5): Summer 1976; University of Massachusetts Amherst Chorale on European tour.
- Freedom (1968) – SATB unaccompanied – Duration: 8 minutes
- In a Spirited Mood (1961) – Brass quintet and baritone horn. Duration: 4 minutes 45 seconds. Publisher: New York, Joshua Corporation. Premiere: 1965; Grambling College, Grambling, Louisiana.
- In Memory of (1984) – Double quartet and trumpet, tenor saxophone, drum set, and string bass.
- In the Spirit and the Flesh (1985) – Orchestra and mixed chorus. Contents: 1. Life; 2. Every Time I Feel the Spirit. Duration: 20 minutes. Commissioned by the Atlanta Symphony Orchestra. Dedicated to Robert Shaw and the Memory of Dr. Martin Luther King Jr. Text: "Life" by Paul Laurence Dunbar. Score: CBMR.
- Inauguration Overture (1988) – Orchestra or concert band. Duration: ca. 6 minutes. Commissioned by Spelman College for the inauguration of Johnnetta Betsch Cole.
- Cor Variations (1977) – Jazz ensemble. Duration: 9 minutes 30 seconds. Premiere: 1977; University of Massachusetts Fine Arts Center; Amherst, MA.
- Metamorphosis on a "Scheme" By J.S.Bach (1972) – Jazz ensemble. Duration: ca. 5 minutes. Premiere: 1972; University of Massachusetts Amherst Jazz Workshop; Amherst, MA. NOTE: Written for a jazz workshop at the University of Massachusetts
- Militant Mood for Brass Sextet (1961) – Duration: ca. 4 minutes 45 seconds. Publisher: New York, Composers Facsimile Edition
- Motions for Trombone and Piano (1964) – Duration: ca. 10 minutes 30 seconds. Publisher: New York, Composers Facsimile Edition. Premiere: 1965; Contemporary Composers Forum; Illinois Wesleyan University; Bloomington, Illinois; Leroy Humphrey, trombone; Abraham Plum, piano. NOTE: Written for Leroy Humphrey
- Music for an Experimental Lab, Ensemble No. 2 (1967) – Soprano flute, 2 trumpets, piano. Duration: 2 minutes. Text: "Gloria." Premiere: 1968; Kentucky State College, Frankfort, Kentucky.
- Nayarac: Fantasy on Duke Ellington's Caravan (1974) – Jazz orchestra. Duration: ca. 6 minutes. Premiere: 1974; University of Massachusetts Amherst Jazz Workshop. NOTE: Written for jazz workshop at University of Massachusetts Amherst
- Niger Symphony (1975) – Chamber orchestra. In two parts. Duration: 13 minutes. Commissioned by the Hartford (Connecticut) Chamber Symphony Orchestra. Publisher: New York, Composer Facsimile Edition. Premiere: July 1975; Hartford, Connecticut; Hartford Chamber Orchestra; Daniel Parker, conductor
- Nobody Knows (1986) – Double quartet (string quartet, trumpet, tenor saxophone, drum set, string bass). Duration: 8 minutes 8 seconds
- One Dozen Rocks, Inc. (1971) – Jazz ensemble. Duration: 5 minutes 25 seconds. Premiere: 1971; University of Massachusetts Amherst Jazz Workshop. NOTE: Written for jazz workshop at University of Massachusetts Amherst
- Overture to a Dance for Concert Band (1961) – Duration: 10 minutes 30 seconds. Publisher: New York, Composers Facsimile Edition. Premiere: 1962; Wiley College; Marshall, Texas. NOTE: Short analysis in "Concert Band Music by Black-American Composers," The Black Perspective in Music 6.2 (Fall 1878):143–50, by Thomas Everett
- Passacaglia for Brass Quintet (1950) – Duration: 4 minutes. Publisher: New York, Joshua Corp. Premiere: 1950; Wiley College, Marshall, Texas
- Pastorale for Wind Ensemble (1974) – Duration: 8 minutes. Publisher: New York, Composers Facsimile Edition
- Quintet for Brass (1962) – Duration: 10 minutes. Publisher: New York, General Music Co
- Ring Shout Concerto for Percussionist And Orchestra (1973–74) – Duration: 20 minutes. Dedicated to Max Roach. Publisher: New York, Composer Facsimile Edition. Score: CBMR. Premiere: 1974; University of Massachusetts Amherst Symphony; Ronald Steele, conductor; Max Roach, soloist
- Saturn (1978) – Jazz orchestra. Duration: 8 minutes
- Secrets of the African Baobob (Variations for Modern Dance/Ballet) (1976) – Jazz orchestra. Duration: 10 minutes. Premiere: 1976; University of Massachusetts Amherst Fine Arts center; Amherst, Massachusetts
- Seton Concerto for Trumpet (1973) – Jazz orchestra. Duration: 9 minutes. Commissioned by Richard Williams, New York
- Spiritual Cycle (1978) – Soprano and orchestra. Text by Robert Hayden. Contents: 1. On Lookout Mountain; 2. Lord Riot; 3. And All the Atoms Cry Aloud. Duration: 15 minutes. Commissioned by the Fine Arts Center, University of Massachusetts. Written for Florence Quivar. Score: CBMR
- Spiritual Fantasy No. 1 (1980) For piccolo, trumpet, and piano – Duration: 9 minutes 3 seconds. Commissioned by Fred Irby III, Washington. Publisher: New York, Composers Facsimile Edition
- Spiritual Fantasy No. 5 (1982) for horn and piano – Duration: 8 minutes
- Spiritual Fantasy No. 6 (1982) for trumpet and symphony orchestra – Duration: 9 minutes
- Spiritual Fantasy No. 9 ("Sympathy") (1986) – for soprano solo, SATB, and brass quintet [text by Paul Laurence Dunbar] – Duration: 11 1/2 minutes
- Spiritual Fantasy No. 12 (1995) – for string quartet – Duration: 9 minutes
- Symphony In Three Movements (Nacirfa Nroh) (1969–70) – Duration: 15 minutes, 2 seconds
- Three Symphonic Spirituals (1978) – Orchestra. Duration: 11 minutes 6 seconds. Contents: 1. We Shall Overcome; 2. Deep River; 3. Swing Low, Sweet Chariot. Commissioned by Columbia Records. Score: CBMR
- Variants on a Theme by John Coltrane (Naima) (1979) – Jazz orchestra. Duration: 6 minutes 30 seconds

== Poetry books by Tillis ==
- In the Spirit and the Flesh, E Publications (1989)
- Images of Mind and Heart E Publications (1991)
- In Celebration (1992)
- Of Moons, Moods, Myths, and the Muse, P&P Publications (1993)
- Harlem Echoes (1995)
- Children's Corner: From A to Z (1997)
- Seasons, Symbols, and Stones (1999)
- Akiyoshidai Diary (2000)
- Scattered Ghosts and Southern Winds
- Bittersweet Harvests (2001)
- Breaking Dawn and Healing (2005)
- The Nature of Things (2006)

== Textbooks by Tillis ==
- Jazz Theory and Improvisation: A Manual of Keyboard, Instrumental (or vocal), and Aural Practice, Silhouette Music Corp., New York (1977)

== Discography ==
- Frederick Tillis: Freedom, New World Records (1996)
1. Motherless Child
2. Spiritual Fantasy No. 12: Nobody Knows the Trouble I See
3. Spiritual Fantasy No. 12: Wade in the Water
4. Spiritual Fantasy No. 12: Crucifixion (He Never Said a Mumbelin' Word)
5. Spiritual Fantasy No. 12: I'm A-Rollin'
6. Spiritual Fantasy No. 9 (Sympathy)
7. Freedom
8. Beyond Shades of Doubt
9. The Rain Forest
10. Singing for The Sake of My Soul
11. The Best Times
