= Internationales Dixieland Festival Dresden =

German Annual Jazz Festival

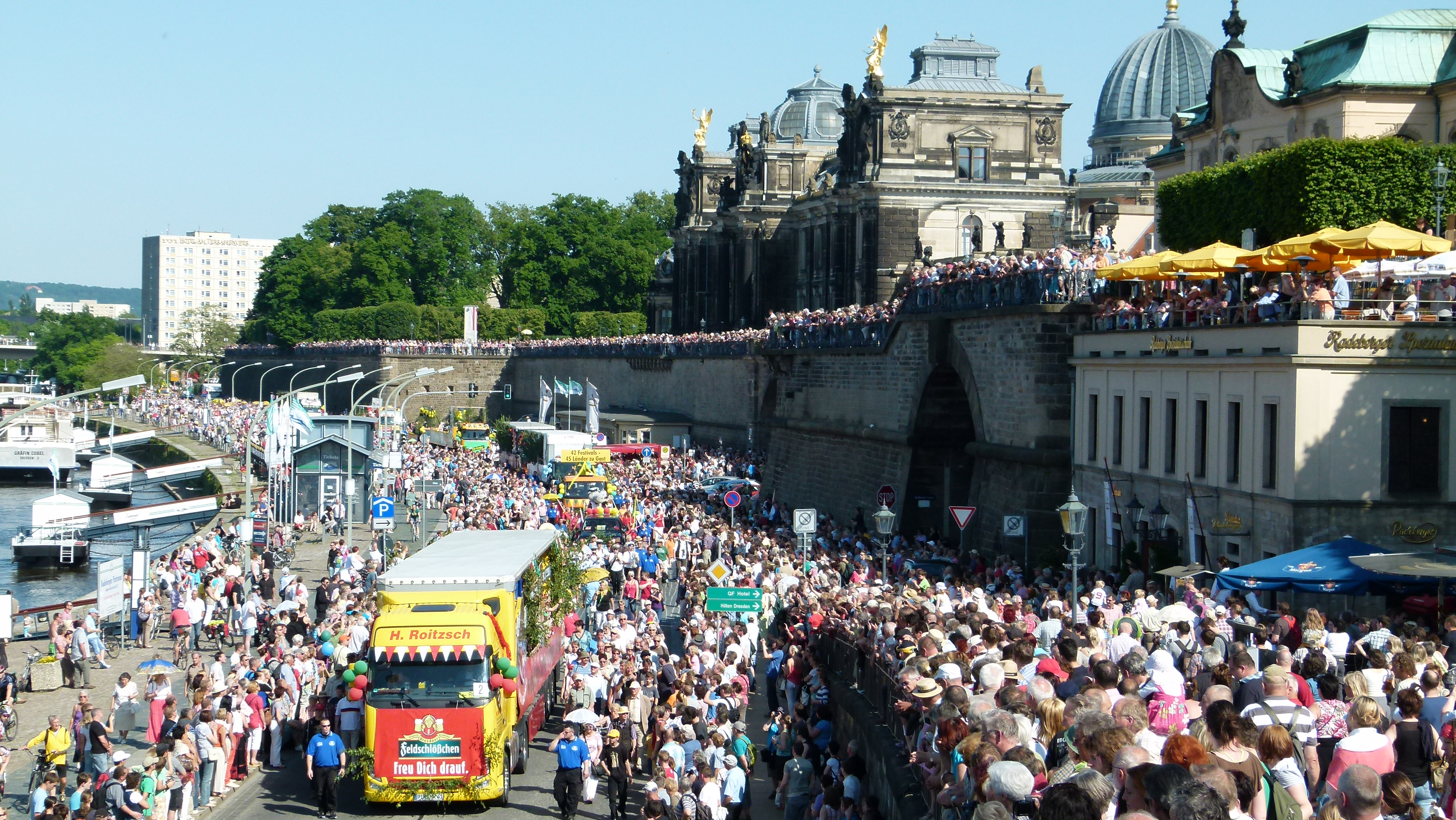
Internationales Dixieland Festival Dresden

Internationales Dixieland Festival Dresden is a jazz festival in Germany. It first took place in 1971. As Germany's oldest and Europe's biggest old-time jazz festival it is a firm fixture in the European scene. For eight days and seven nights, the capital of Saxony becomes Swingin' Dresden and draws up to around half a million jazz fans to the city, depending on the weather. One of the annual highlights is the riverboat shuffle on the Elbe, when the world's oldest and largest fleet of paddle-steamers becomes a floating stage and festival-goers are invited to step aboard. The climax is the Dixieland parade through the city centre, which culminates in a farewell jazz session.
