= City of Derry Jazz and Big Band Festival =

Annual jazz event in Northern Ireland

- Genre: Jazz
- Locations: Derry, Northern Ireland
- Years active: 2002-present
- Website: City Of Derry Jazz And Big Band Festival

The City Of Derry Jazz And Big Band Festival is a jazz festival held annually in Derry, Northern Ireland. It started in 2002 and is funded by Derry City and Strabane District Council, Guinness and the Department for Communities and is supported by BBC Radio Foyle and BBC Radio Ulster. It also features some blues and is one of the leading annual music events in Ireland.

== Memorable performances ==
- The 2009 Festival, Jools Holland and Rhythm & Blues Orchestra performed in The Millennium Forum.
- Moncef Genoud performed in the Playhouse in 2009.
- Kyle Eastwood performed in the temporary Spiegeltent located at Guildhall Square in 2014.

== See also ==
- List of jazz festivals
