= Black Sea Arena =

Indoor arena in Shekvetili, Georgia

- ბლექ სი არენა

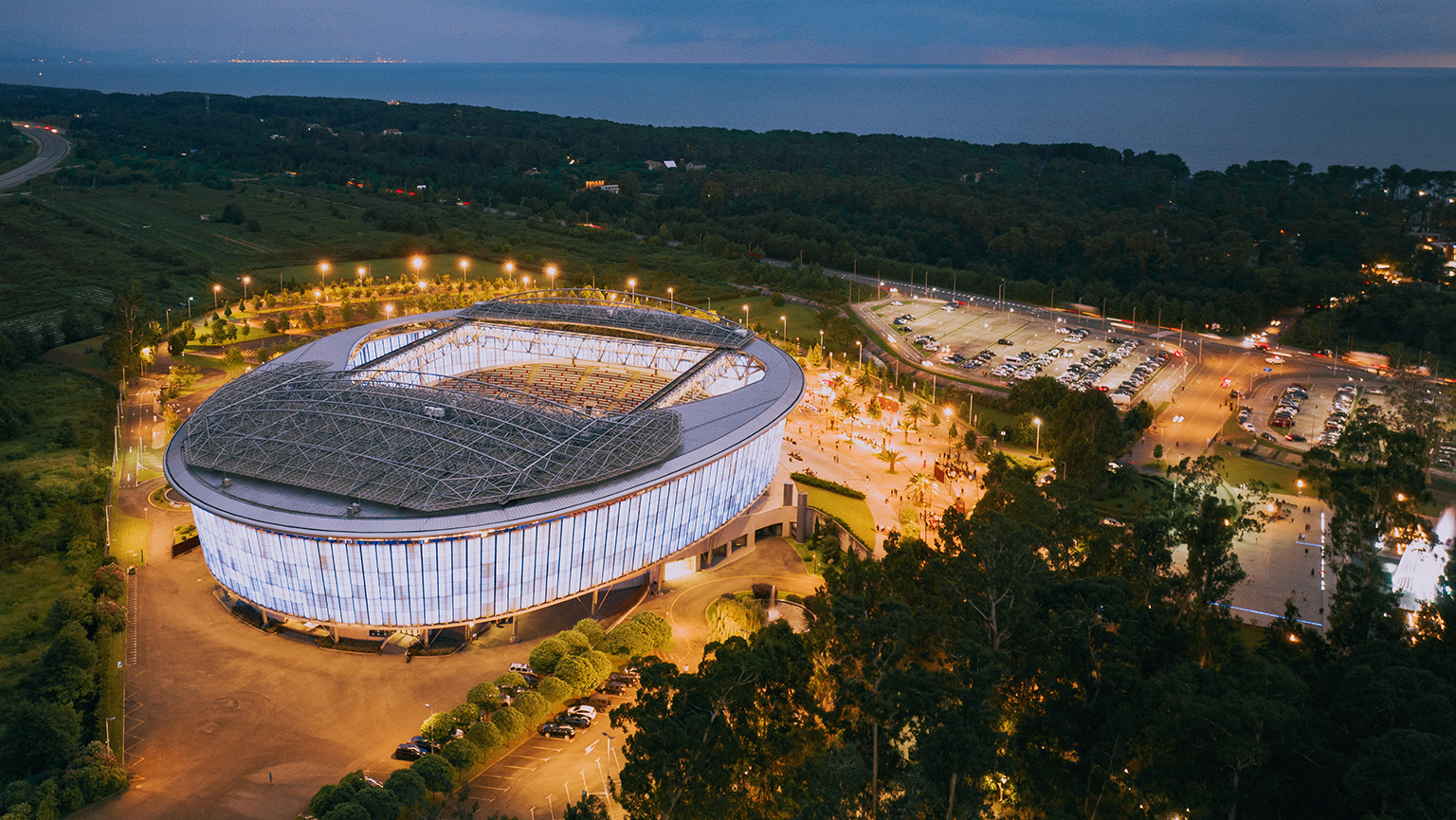
- Interactive map of Black Sea Arena
- Location: Shekvetili, Guria, Georgia
- Coordinates: 41°56′18.376″N 41°46′29.166″E
- Capacity: 9,000

Construction
- Groundbreaking: 2008
- Opened: 31 July 2016
- Cost: ₾200 million GEL ($93 million USD)
- Architect: Drei Architekten

Website
- www.bsa.ge

Black Sea Arena is an indoor arena located on the coast of the Black Sea in Shekvetili, Guria, Georgia, some 45 km north of Batumi, the country's second largest city.

The venue, designed by the architects from the German company Drei Architekten, is the largest open concert hall in the Caucasus. The oval shaped auditorium, with a capacity of 9,000 seats configured in circular grandstands, has a retractable roof and rotatable facade panels.

The American singer-songwriter Christina Aguilera performed at the official opening of the Black Sea Arena on July 30, 2016. Since then it has hosted various events, including the concerts of major international stars such as Aerosmith, Scorpions, Elton John, The Black Eyed Peas, Thirty Seconds to Mars, Jessie J, Vanessa Mae, CeeLo Green, Ennio Morricone, The Killers, and OneRepublic. Numerous concerts featuring Georgian stars were also held at Black Sea Arena.

== Concerts ==
Concerts at Black Sea Arena
Date	Artist	Stage	Tour	Ref.
2016
July 31	Christina Aguilera	Main	—N/a	
August 6	Vanessa-Mae	Main	—N/a	
August 20	Scorpions	Main	50th Anniversary World Tour	
2017
May 20	Aerosmith	Main	Aero-Vederci Baby! Tour; Part of the Check in Georgia project	
July 23	Katie Melua	Main	Part of the Check in Georgia project	
August 10	Eric Benét & CeeLo Green	Main	Part of the Check in Georgia project	
August 18	Gipsy Kings	Main	Part of the Check in Georgia project	
August 21	Nino Katamadze & Insight	Main	Part of the Check in Georgia project	
August 26	Goran Bregović	Main	—N/a	
2018
May 19	Ennio Morricone with Orchestra Roma Sinfonietta	Main	60 Years of Music Tour	
June 30 (Note: The concert of 30 June and 1 July, 2018 were originally scheduled for 16 and 17 September 2016, but were postponed due to Davey Johnstone's illness.)	Elton John	Main	Wonderful Crazy Night Tour	
July 1	Elton John	Main	Wonderful Crazy Night Tour	
July 19	Robert Plant & Sensational Space Shifters	Main	Black Sea Jazz Festival	
2019
June 16	The Black Eyed Peas	Main	Masters of the Sun Tour	
August 6	Jessie J	Main	The Lasty Tour	
August 13	Thirty Seconds to Mars	Main	Monolith Tour	
2022
August 15	L'Impératrice	Front	—N/a	
2023
August 5 (Note: The concert of August 5, 2023 was previously scheduled for July 18, 2020, but was postponed due to the situation caused by COVID-19 pandemic.)	Nile Rodgers & Chic	Front	Part of Starring Georgia project	
August 6	FKJ	Front	Part of Starring Georgia project	
August 15	The Killers	Main	Part of Starring Georgia project	

=== Cancelled Concerts ===
Cancelled concerts at Black Sea Arena
Date	Artist	Tour	Reason for cancellation	Ref.
May 28, 2022 (Note: The concert of May 28, 2022 was previously scheduled for October 10, 2020, but was postponed due to the situation caused by COVID-19 pandemic.)	OneRepublic	The European Tour	Russian invasion of Ukraine	

== Controversies ==
In June 2024, English group Massive Attack canceled a concert at the Black Sea Arena, originally scheduled for 28 July, in response to the Georgian government's repression of the nationwide civil protests against law proposals that could have restricted freedom of press and LGBT rights in the country. The venue's management initially attributed the cancellation to "unforeseen circumstances"; however, the band later explained their decision in a statement, writing quote, "At this moment, performing at the state-owned Black Sea Arena could be seen as an endorsement of their violent crackdown against peaceful protests and civil society".
