= Tbilisi Jazz Festival =

- Genre: Jazz, blues, soul
- Dates: October
- Locations: Tbilisi Concert Hall; Tbilisi, Georgia
- Years active: 1978, 1986, 1989, 2000–present
- Website: Tbilisi Jazz

The Tbilisi Jazz Festival (Georgian: თბილისის ჯაზ-ფესტივალი) is an annual international jazz festival held in Tbilisi, Georgia, which, along with Batumi's Black Sea Jazz Festival, is the country's main jazz event. It was first held in 1978 and became an annual event in 2000. Its traditional venue is the Tbilisi Concert Hall.

== History ==
The first edition of the Tbilisi Jazz Festival was organized as "All-Soviet Jazz Festival" in 1978, when Georgia was a constituent republic of the Soviet Union. Bringing together 23 bands from 13 Soviet cities, it was attended by nearly 30,000 people and was one of the largest jazz events held in the Soviet Union. The festival recurred in 1986—reported by Billboard as an "outstanding success" and a boost to jazz in the Soviet Union—and 1989. Being dormant in post-Soviet Georgia for a decade, the festival was revived in 2000. Since then, it has been held annually. In the 2000s, the festival broadened its scope, including blues, soul, and rock artists, both Georgian and international.
