= Grampians Jazz Festival =

The Grampians Jazz Festival was an annual festival of jazz with a three-day event held throughout the second weekend in February in Halls Gap, Victoria. The festival commenced in 1987 in Roses Gap with only 14 performing bands and moved to Halls Gap in 1992. After running for 30 years, in 2016, the festival came to an end. This last iteration hosted over 130 bands performing various styles of jazz from traditional to contemporary. Given the location, the festival attracted musicians and fans from various states, including Victoria, South Australia, New South Wales, and Australian Capital Territory.

The majority of the shows took place outdoors in marquees with a few indoor venues with a big band marquee set up for the last day of the festival on Sunday. On Saturday, the second day of the festival, there was a march in the centre of the town where musicians paraded on the street.

The termination of the festival resulted into two jazz festivals, Halls Gap Jazz & Blues Festival and Port Fairy Jazz Festival.

== See also ==
- List of jazz festivals
