= Wagga Wagga Jazz and Blues Festival =

Coordinates: 35°06′12″S 147°22′08″E

The Wagga Wagga Jazz and Blues Festival was a three-day event held in September of each year, in Wagga Wagga, New South Wales which is the major city of the Riverina region of New South Wales, Australia. The festival commenced as the Wagga Wagga Jazz Festival in 1995 and had grown to accommodate at least 530 musicians playing in some 80 bands.

Regional, intra and interstate musicians arrived to play at the festival each year.

The festival ceased running after the 2014 iteration.

== See also ==
- List of jazz festivals
