= Luanda International Jazz Festival =

Jazz festival in Luanda, Angola

The Luanda International Jazz Festival, also known as the Luanda Jazz Fest, is a jazz festival, held annually since 2009 in Luanda, Angola.

== Background ==
Held at the Cine Atlantico in late July and early August, the festival has attracted legendary musicians, including McCoy Tyner, Gary Bartz, George Benson, Dee Dee Bridgewater, Cassandra Wilson, Joe Sample, Randy Crawford, Abdullah Ibrahim, Manu Dibango and the Yellowjackets. It has also featured notable Angolan musicians, including Ricardo Lemvo, Afrikkanitha, Sandra Corderio, Dodo Miranda, Simmons Massini and Toto and Mozambican-born guitarist Jimmy Dludlu.

== See also ==
- List of festivals in Angola
- List of jazz festivals
