= Black Sea Jazz Festival =

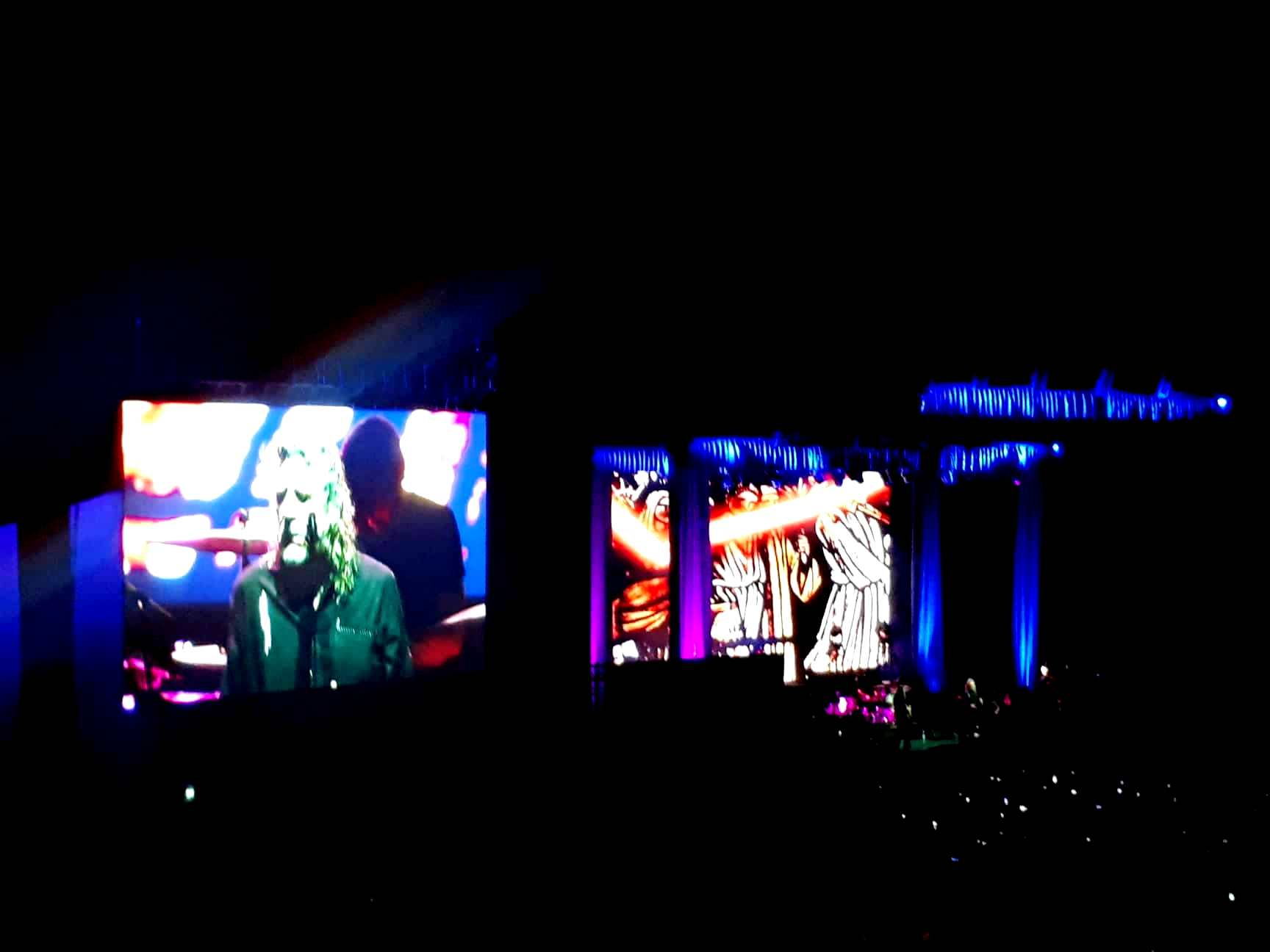
- Robert Plant performing at the Black Sea Arena at the Black Sea Jazz Festival, 2018.
- Genre: Jazz, blues, soul, R&B, rock
- Dates: July
- Locations: Georgia: Batumi, Black Sea Arena
- Years active: 2007–present
- Website: Black Sea Jazz Festival

The Black Sea Jazz Festival (Georgian: შავი ზღვის ჯაზ-ფესტივალი) is an international jazz festival held annually, traditionally in July, in Batumi and nearby locations on Georgia's Black Sea coast, which, along with Tbilisi Jazz Festival, is one of the country's main jazz events.

The festival was founded in 2007. The subsequent editions broadened the scope of the festival to include rock, R&B, soul, disco, funk, and hip-hop and hosted both Georgian and international performers as diverse as George Clinton, Snoop Dogg, Lisa Stansfield, The Prodigy, and Robert Plant. The 10th edition, held from 15 to 24 July 2016, was the largest one in the history of the Black Sea Jazz Festival.
