= Yosemite International Jazz Festival =

The Yosemite International Jazz Festival is/was an annual autumn jazz festival held near Yosemite National Park, in Madera County, California. It was scheduled to be one of the concluding shows of the West Coast Jazz Season.

== Description ==
The Yosemite International Jazz Festival has been a 3-day event. It featured a mix of regional, national, and professional musicians.

=== 2011 festival ===
The inaugural 2011 Festival was organized by the Oakhurst Chamber of Commerce, and was held at the Chukchansi Gold Resort & Casino in Coarsegold.

The musicians that participated in the 2011 festival Included: Big Bad Voodoo Daddy, Spyro Gyra, Richard Elliot, Greg Adams, Karen Marguth, Alice Lui, Tim and Myles Thompson, Dana Abbott, Rich Severson, and the Yosemite Jazz Band.

=== 2013 festival ===
The 2013 festival was held at the Sierra Sky Ranch.
