= Satchmo SummerFest =

Music festival in New Orleans, Louisiana

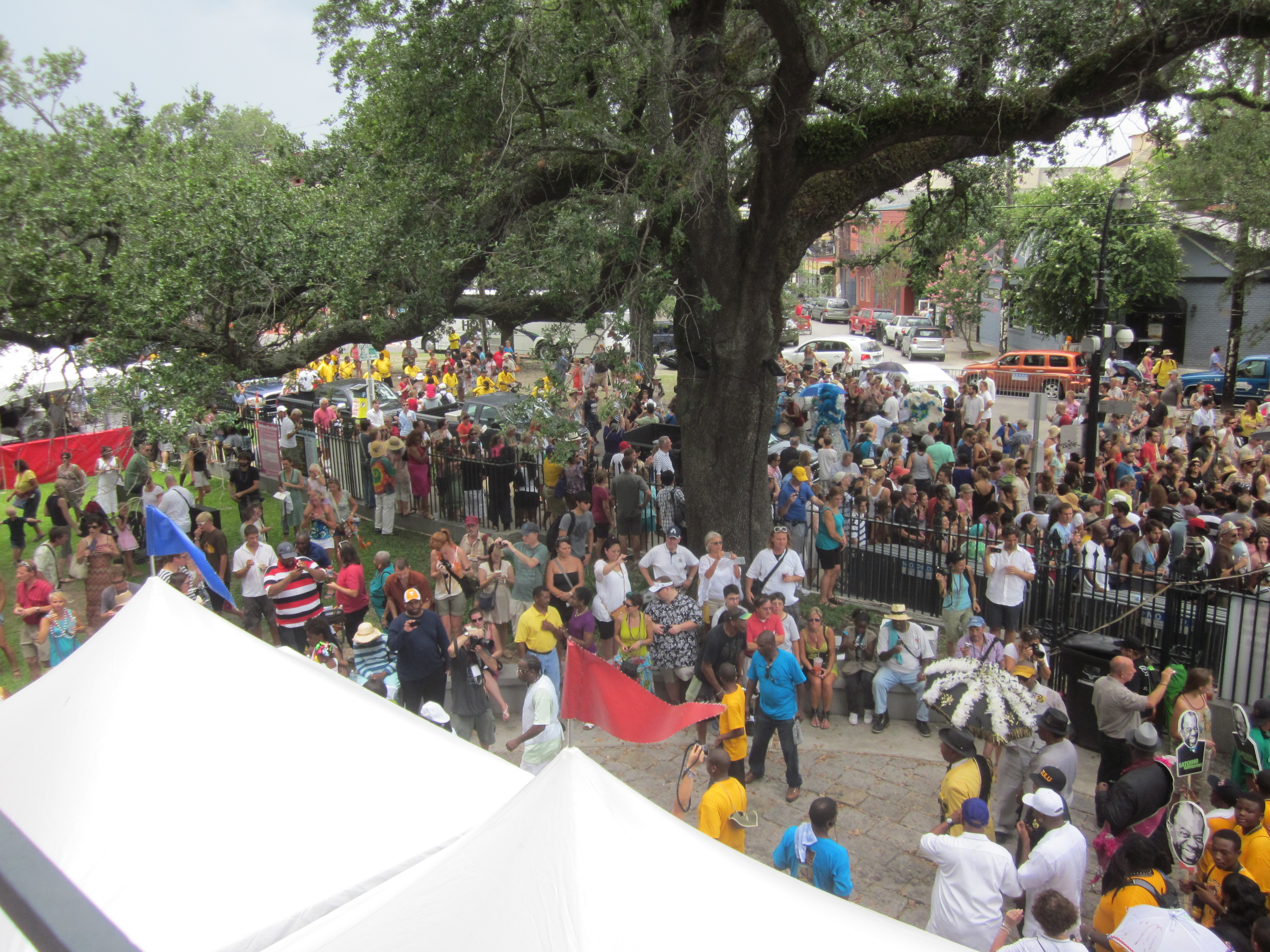
Satchmo SummerFest in 2012

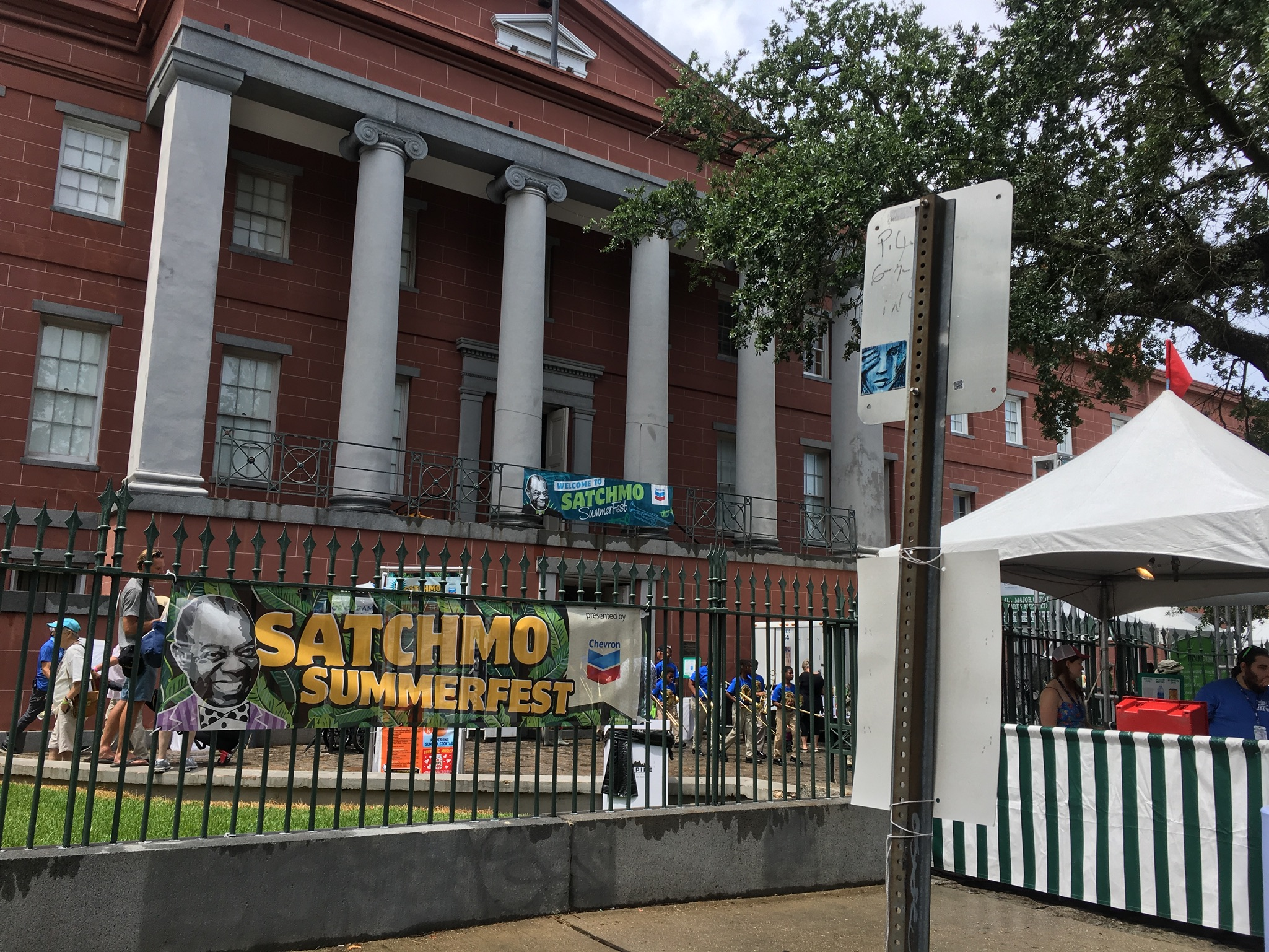
Satchmo SummerFest in 2018

Satchmo SummerFest (also known as Satchmofest) is an annual music festival held in New Orleans, Louisiana, in celebration of the jazz trumpeter Louis Armstrong. It is held in early August in order to coincide with August 4, Armstrong's birthday. It was founded in 2001, in conjunction with Armstrong's centennial celebration.

The festival is traditionally held on the grounds of the old New Orleans Mint, now part of the Louisiana State Museum. It has multiple stages, including stages for traditional and contemporary jazz, big-band jazz, and a children's stage for up-and-coming jazz musicians. In his book New Atlantis, John Swenson said that it "never fails to be one of the most joyous and characteristically New Orleans festivals of the year."

2020 saw the Summerfest go virtual due to the COVID-19 pandemic, but it did happen in 2021.

As of 2021, Satchmo Summerfest, French Quarter Festival, and Holidays New Orleans Style are formally overseen by the nonprofit French Quarter Festivals, Inc., which as of 2017 is led by CEO Emily Madero.

== See also ==
- List of jazz festivals
- New Orleans Jazz & Heritage Festival
