= Halifax Jazz Festival =

- Genre: Jazz festival
- Location: Atlantic Canada
- Years active: 1987–present
- Attendance: 55,000
- Website: www.halifaxjazzfestival.ca

The TD Halifax Jazz Festival, formerly known as the Atlantic Jazz Festival, is the oldest jazz festival and largest summer festival in Atlantic Canada, being held annually since 1987. Designated a Hallmark Event by the Halifax Regional Municipality, the event spans two weekends (9 nights, 8 days), attracts up to 55,000 visitors, involves 450 volunteers and employs over 350 local musicians.

Core programming includes jazz music, complemented with presentations of world, roots, blues, Latin, R&B, and other music styles. Since 2023, locations of performances included the TD Main Stage, St. Matthew's United Church, and The Carleton. While paid passes and tickets to individual shows are available, the festival always includes a host of free programming during the day.

The festival includes the Halifax Jazz Festivals Music Education Program. These programs include Jazz Labs, which are free events for the public, and the Creative Music Workshop, an eight-day intensive program which provides students with instruction on skills like performing improvisational jazz.

== Lineups ==
=== 2020 ===
2020 event was scheduled to be held from July 7 to 12, 2020. In April 2020, it was announced that the festival was cancelled by its organizers following the COVID-19 pandemic. The event was later held online from July 31 to August 2, 2020.

=== 2021 ===
In 2021, online event was held from July 14 to August 15, marking the event's 35th anniversary.

=== 2022 ===
The 2022 event was held from July 12–17 in downtown Halifax.

=== 2023 ===
The 2023 event was held from July 11–16. Performers include Feist, Fleet Foxes, Sudan Archives, Digable Planets, Shaggy, BadBadNotGood, and Jenn Grant. A standard pass cost $215.56 CAD, while a Fusion Pass cost $322.04 CAD.

=== 2024 ===
The 2024 event was held from July 9-14th. Matt Andersen was the headline performer. Other performers included Killer Mike, Fitz and the Tantrums, Emmylou Harris, and The War and Treaty.

The 2024 Jazz Labs lineup took place from July 10-13, and included events such as African Drumming with Henry Bishop, Exploring Jazz standards Workshop, Inside the Music: Maryna Krut, and Razzmatazz for Kids (with the latter two being held at the Central Library, located on Spring Garden Road). The 2024 Creative Music Workshop was held from July 6-14, and took place at the Nova Scotia Community College campus located in Dartmouth, Nova Scotia.

=== 2025 ===
The 2025 event was held from July 15-20th. Main stage performers included Big Boi, St. Vincent, Iron and Wine (with Sarah Harmer), The Decemberists (with Goldie Boutilier), Adam Baldwin, and The Jenny Wren. Additional performances also took place at the Lighthouse Arts Centre, and included Femi Kuti & The Positive Force, Renee Rosnes with the Mike Murley Trio, Endea Owens, and Bill Frisell.
