= Golden River City Jazz Festival =

Former annual music festival in Kortrijk, Belgium

- Genre: Jazz
- Dates: First weekend in September
- Locations: Kortrijk, Belgium
- Coordinates: 50.834°N 3.267°E
- Years active: 1960–2016

The Golden River City Jazz Festival was an annual music festival in Kortrijk, Belgium, on the first weekend in September coinciding with the local 'September' Braderie, focusing on jazz. The Festival was an opportunity for The Golden River City Jazz Band to showcase their repertoire and to mingle with international musicians. No less than 30 times the Golden River City Jazz Band played a major role at the annual festival in its hometown. The real breakthrough occurred in 1973, when the band had the opportunity to accompany British singer Beryl Bryden.
