= The Golden River City Jazz Band =

Belgian jazz band

- Origin: Kortrijk, West-Flanders, Belgium
- Genres: Jazz; New Orleans Jazz
- Years active: 1970–present
- Members: Jean-Jacques Pieters; Colin Bowden; Terry Brunt; Arsene De Vlieger; Jean-Paul Mahieu
- Past members: Alan Eldson; Cees Van den Heuvel

The Golden River City Jazz Band is a New Orleans jazz band founded in 1970 in Kortrijk, Belgium, by clarinettist Jean-Jacques Pieters. The band is most noted for performances at the annual Kortrijk Golden River City Jazz Festival.

== Members ==
- Jean-Jacques Pieters – clarinet, saxophone
- Terry Brunt – trombone
- Alan Eldson – trumpet
- Arsene De Vlieger – banjo
- Jean-Paul Mahieu – bass
- Colin Bowden – drums

== Discography ==
- Golden River City Jazz Band + George Probert + Jim Driscoll
- Festival
- The Lantern (Parsifal)
- The Artist (Parsifal)
- Memories (Parsifal)
- 20th Anniversary Album (Moss)
- 30 Years Golden River City Jazz Festival Kortrijk (Golden River)
- Lange Munte Blues (Hill Recordings)
- 25 years Golden River City Jazz Band (Golden River)
- GRC Live Party (Golden River)
- GRC & Oscar Klein (Golden River)
- Hold That Tiger (Golden River)
- Tribute to Alan Elsdon (Golden River)
