= Nuevo León Jazz Festival =

Annual festival in Mexico

The Nuevo León Jazz Festival is a jazz music festival held annually since 2014 in Monterrey, Mexico. It is organized by the Nuevo León Council for Culture and the Arts, in collaboration with the UANL Alfonsino Festival.

According to the Music Coordinator of the State Council for Culture and Arts (Conarte) of Nuevo León "one of the guidelines of the festival is to give opportunity and space to local groups and artists who are doing contemporary jazz or fusion with other genres."

== History ==
The first edition of the festival was held in Monterrey from October 27 to November 2, 2014, at venues such as the Teatro del Centro de las Artes, the "Adolfo Prieto" School, and the Museum of Mexican History (MHM). Musicians such as New York guitarist Jack Wilkins, Tito Rodríguez, PA'AX Jazz Trio, Oscar Zensei, Francisco Lelo de Larrea, Roger Nuncio Trio, Carlos Lara and the Motherfunkers, as well as the FAMUS Big Band and Oscar Keys Sandoval, performed.

The second edition of the festival, held from May 25 to 31, 2015, featured artists such as Mexican pianist Alex Mercado, Pájaro Jazz Trio, Rodrigo Cantú Trio, Dúo Malva, and Los Mother Fuckers.

The festival was closed in 2019 and 2020 due to the death of its director, guitarist Óscar "Zensei" González.

The sixth edition of the Nuevo León Jazz Festival, directed by Pilar Diosdado and in collaboration with the Ministry of Culture and Education of San Pedro Garza García and the Monterrey School of Music and Dance, took place from October 3 to 9, 2021, amid the COVID-19 pandemic. The in-person events held at the San Pedro Auditorium were fully attended, as permitted by the authorities.
