= Fest Bossa & Jazz =

- Genre: Jazz, blues and bossa nova
- Locations: Natal, Tibau do Sul, São Miguel do Gostoso and Mossoró
- Years active: 2010–present
- Founders: Juçara Figueiredo
- Website: festbossajazz.com.br

Fest Bossa & Jazz is a Brazilian cultural and tourism project held annually in the cities of Natal, Pipa Beach (Tibau do Sul), São Miguel do Gostoso and Mossoró in Rio Grande do Norte. The festival takes place in multiple venues including performances, pocket shows, lectures, workshops and social gatherings for musicians and students.

Brazilian and international musicians perform during the event in jazz, blues and bossa nova genres. Past performers have included Ivan Lins, Ed Motta, Lenine, Leny Andrade, Yamandu Costa, Roberta Sá, Marcos Valle, Wanda Sá, Leila Pinheiro, Roberto Menescal, Sandra de Sá, João Donato, Coco Montoya, José James, Galactic, Stanley Jordan, Eric Gales, Larry McCray and Raphael Wressnig.
