= Howard University Jazz Ensemble =

The Howard University Jazz Ensemble (HUJE) was founded in 1975 by its director, Fred Irby III. They have performed in the United States, Europe, South America, Asia, Senegal and the Caribbean.

The HUJE has been heard on radio and television as well as in concert. Members of the HUJE have won awards as performers and composers/arrangers, and the ensemble includes among its alumni several practicing jazz artists. HUJE was featured during the 1992, 1996 and 2005 Kennedy Center Honors Gala (CBS-TV).

HUJE has released forty four recordings in a distinguished series that began in 1976.
