= North Sumatra Jazz Festival =

Music festival in Indonesia

The North Sumatra Jazz Festival (NSJF) has earned recognition as one of the world's most distinguished annual jazz festivals in North Sumatra which features Indonesian and international artists engaging with European cultural institutions. The festival, which was initiated by Erucakra Mahameru with Waspada eMusic (WEM) and supported by indiejazzINDONESIA, was held for the first time in 2011 in Medan, Indonesia. NSJF presents its own concept of jazz performance, which makes it different from other jazz festivals in the archipelago. It is the largest jazz festival in the northern part of the island of Sumatra.

== The festival ==
Year	Date	Place	Artists
2011	1-2 July 2011	Hotel Danau Toba International, Medan.	BEX-Project, LIGRO, Sruti Respati, Erucakra & C Man, Donny Suhendra Project, Suhu Band, Rocker Kasarunk, KSP feat Idang Rasjidi and Yovie Widianto Fusion.
2012	26 November 2012	Convention Centre Hotel Tiara, Medan.	Balawan, Erucakra Mahameru, C Man, Rafli, Agam Hamzah, Bertha, Reza Artamevia, and Iwanouz.
2013	13 September 2013	Ballrom Hotel Grand Aston, Medan.	Suarasama, Erucakra Mahameru, C Man, Iwang Noorsaid, Dion Idol, Sherly’O, and Medan Funk.
2014	21 June 2014	Convention Hall Hermes Place Polonia, Medan.	Jamal Mohamed, Jonathan Jones, Steve Thornton, Razak Rahman, Drum’N Wind, Espen Eriksen Trio, Fusion Stuff, Bintang Indrianto Trio++, Rieka Roslan, North Sumatra Junior Jazz, and Erucakra & C Man.
2015	11 April 2015	Grand Ballroom, Karibia Boutique Hotel, Medan.	Roedyanto, Erucakra Mahameru & C Man, the KadriJimmo, Keenan Nasution, Teza Sumendra, and Phil Yoon Group.
2016	4 May 2016	Ballroom Santika Premiere Dyandra Hotel & Convention Center, Medan.	Krakatau Reunion, Jeff Lorber Band, Phil Yoon Group, and Erucakra & C Man
2017	20 October 2017	J.W. Marriott Hotel, Medan	Tulus, Erucakra & C Man, Ed Van Ness, Chelsea Hadi, and Mahasora
2018	21 October 2018	J.W. Marriott Hotel, Medan	Eva Celia, Erucakra & C Man, Bonita, North Sumatra Junior Jazz feat Nikita Mawarni, Toby Tan Kai Rong, and more
2019	6 October 2019	Mahogany Grand Ballroom CityHall, Medan	Erucakra & C Man, Sanne Rambags Under The Surface, Phil Yoon Group, Voyager, and Afif Nabawi
2022	28 July 2022	Auditorium Nommensen	Duo Weeger, Erucakra & C Man, Junita Batubara, Ondi Yohan Tambunan, Kamaluddin Galingging, Ance Juliet Panggabean, Tria Amelia Simbolon, and Daniel Alexander Malau
