= RiverJazz Festival =

American jazz festival

Coordinates: 40.61479°N 75.36809°W

River Jazz Music Festival
- Genre: Jazz, Jazz Fushion, Smooth Jazz, Avant-Garde Jazz, Swing, Bebop, Jazz Improvisation
- Dates: May/June
- Location: Bethlehem, Pennsylvania
- Years active: 2011–present
- Founders: ArtsQuest
- Website: www.artsquest.org/festivals/riverjazz/

The RiverJazz Festival is a jazz music festival started by ArtsQuest in 2011. The festival has been held each year at SteelStacks in Bethlehem, Pennsylvania. SteelStacks is a dynamic arts, culture and education campus that was constructed on 4.5 acres of the former Bethlehem Steel Corporation.

The event showcases local and national jazz and swing artists over the course of several days, typically sometime in April, May, or June. Attendees are welcome to attend the many free shows around the festival, or purchase tickets to see national headlining acts, where they are also offered meal options.

== 2016 Lineup ==
=== Yuengling Musikfest Cafe Stage at the ArtsQuest Center ===
- Pat Metheny & Ron Carter
- Craig Thatcher Band
- Charter Arts Big Band
- Kamasi Washington
- North Penn Navy Jazz Band
- Jessy J
- Brian Dunne
- Delbert McClinton

=== TD Community Stage on the Capital Blue Cross Creativity Commons ===
- Mike Lorenz Trio
- Blackbird Society Orchestra
- Korey Riker Trio
- Craig Kastelnik & Friends

== 2015 Lineup ==
=== Yuengling Musikfest Cafe Performers ===
- Dr. John & The Nite Trippers
- Dave Liebman
- Spyro Gyra
- Laura Dubin Trio
- Dan Wilkins Trio
- Blackbird Society Orchestra
- Eric Mintel Trio

=== Frank Banko Alehouse Cinema Jazz on Film Movie Series ===
- The Glenn Miller Story
- Lady Sings the Blues
- Young Man with a Horn
- Mo' Better Blues

== 2014 Lineup ==
- Preservation Hall Jazz Band
- Pat Martino
- Cherry Poppin' Daddies
- Jane Monheit
- Terence Blanchard
- Jessy Carolina & The Hot Mess
- Miss Tess & The Talkbacks
- Gas House Gorillas
- Perseverance Jazz Band
- Smooth Operators
- Craig Kastelnik & Friends

== 2013 Lineup ==
- Chick Corea
- The Fabulous Thunderbirds
- Preservation Hall Jazz Band
- Quakertown High School Jazz Band
- Big Bad Voodoo Daddy
- Cook Trio
- The Girls: A Tribute to Mom
- Dan DeChellis
- Jason Miles

== 2012 Lineup ==
- Walter Trout & The Radicals
- Preservation Hall Jazz Band
- Béla Fleck
- The Marcus Roberts Trio
- Kevin Eubanks
- Lynnie Godfrey
- Eric Mintel Quartet

== 2011 Lineup ==
- Spyro Gyra
- Preservation Hall Jazz Band
- The Clayton Brothers
- Craig Kastelnik & Friends
- Bitches Brew Revisited
- Dan DeChellis
- Eric Mintel Quartet
- Central Park Stompers
- June Thomas
- Woody Browns Project
- Audio Dynamikz
