= Garda Jazz Festival =

- Genre: Jazz
- Dates: August
- Locations: Trentino, Italy
- Website: www.gardajazz.com

Garda Jazz Festival is an annual jazz festival held in Trentino, Italy. It is usually held at the end of August. It hosts contemporary jazz musicians. In 2015 Kyle Eastwood performed at the festival.
