= Ipswich Jazz Festival =

The Ipswich Jazz Festival is a jazz music and arts festival held in Ipswich, Suffolk. The first event was held in 2015 in partnership with the Ipswich Arts Festival and mixes established talent, rising stars and regional players. It also features art and photography exhibitions, film screenings and workshops held in venues across the town.

== Local Musicians ==
The festival organisers have been keen to promote up and coming talent and the festival features a number of performances by local jazz musicians.

== Exhibitions, Films and Workshops ==
The festival also features art and photographic exhibitions and screenings of classic jazz films. Jazz workshops allow everyone to get involved in making music.

== Jazz musicians at Ipswich Jazz Festival ==
Jazz musicians who have performed at the Ipswich Jazz Festival

=== 2015 ===
==== Big names ====
Clare Teal, Zoe Francis, Jim Mullen, Noemi Nuti, Jason Rebello, Andrew McCormack, Quentin Collins, Mick Hutton.

==== Local Musicians ====
Morphology, Jazz Arrivals, Last Orders, Phoenix Jazz, Haunted Kitchen, Steam on my Clothes, Body and Soul, Weird Rare Animal

==== Exhibitions, Films and Workshops ====
Jazz Art and Artifacts Exhibition, Jazz Camera exhibition by John Watson, Mo' Better Blues, The Man with the Jazz Guitar (biography of Ken Sykora), Jazz Drumming for Absolute Beginners, Learn How to Sing Jazz, Jazz Masterclass with Clare Teal's band.
