= Istanbul Jazz Festival =

- Genre: Jazz
- Dates: July
- Location(s): Istanbul, Turkey
- Coordinates: 41°00′49″N 28°57′18″E
- Years active: 1994–present
- Website: Official site

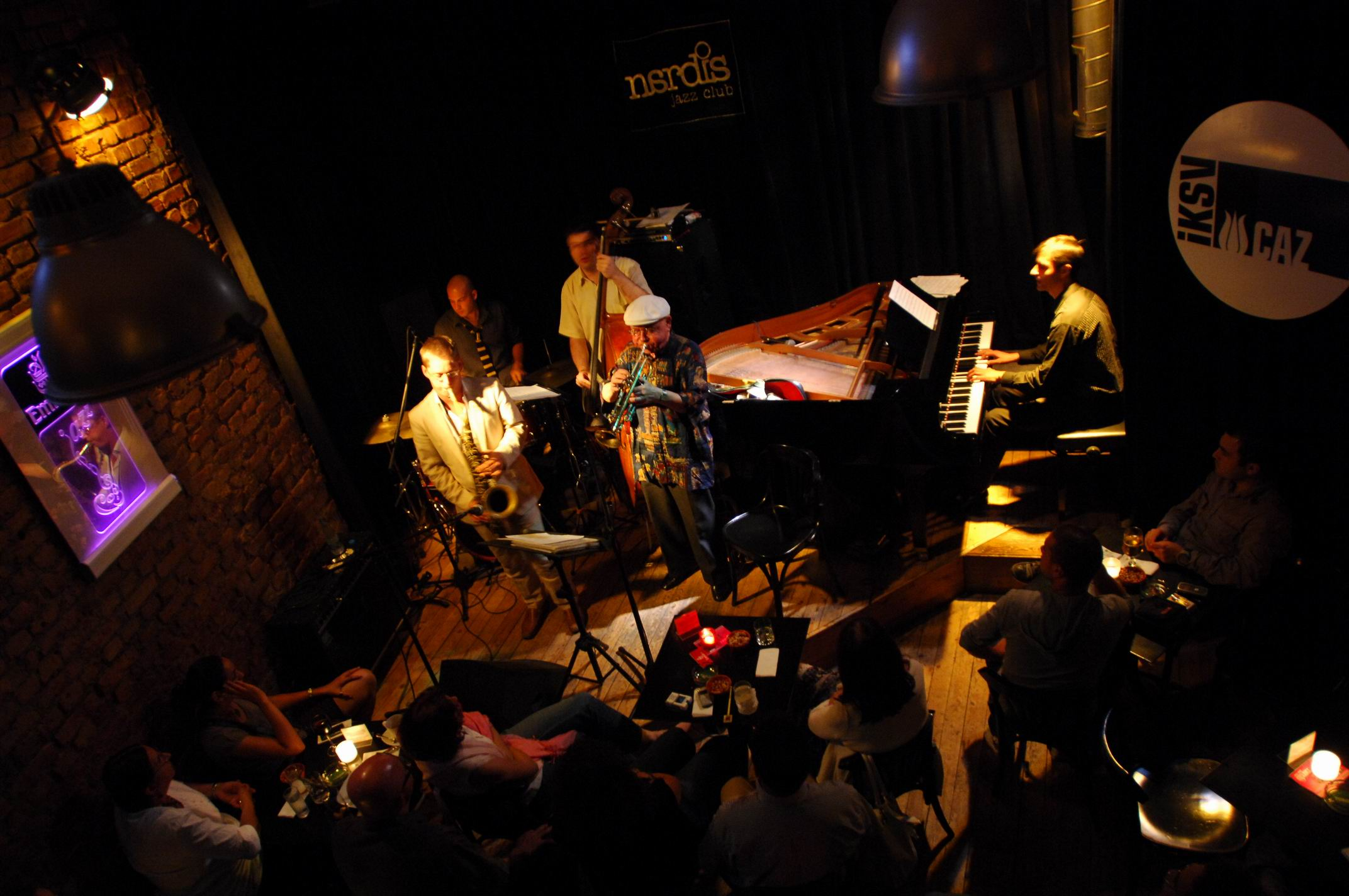

The Istanbul Jazz Festival, formerly Istanbul Festival, (Turkish: İstanbul Caz Festivali) is a cultural event held every July in Istanbul, Turkey. It offers a selection of jazz music performances with the participations of famous artists from all over the world. The festival was first held in 1994 and is organized by the Istanbul Foundation of Culture and Arts. Its main sponsor is Garanti BBVA.

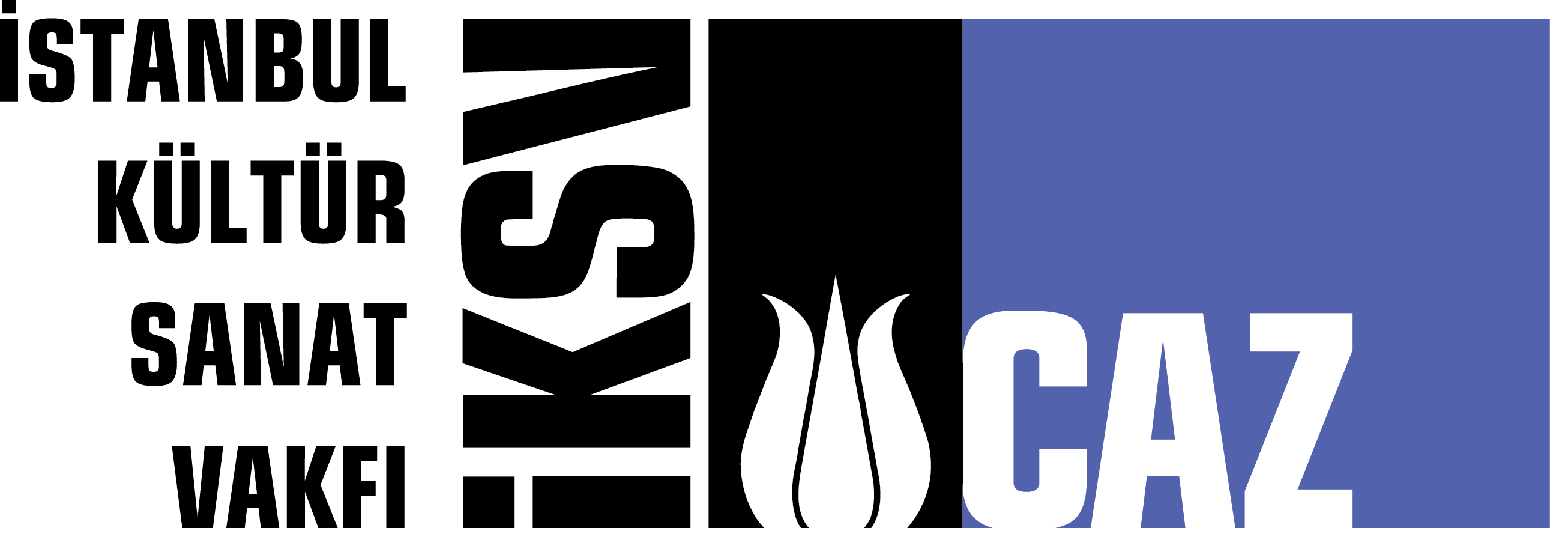
Logo of Istanbul Jazz Festival

The festival had its beginnings in a concert given by Chick Corea and Steve Kujala on July 8, 1984, as a part of Istanbul Music Festival. This concert ignited more and more jazz events during the following years. Beginning in 1986, jazz was on the program. Since 1994, the Istanbul Jazz Festival has also hosted musicians in rock, pop, blues, reggae and New-age music. The Istanbul Jazz Festival is a founding member of the International Jazz Festivals Organization (shortly IJFO), which it chaired from 1998 to 2001.

Musicians who have appeared at the festival include George Benson, Jane Birkin, Björk, Goran Bregovic, Nick Cave, Eric Clapton, Stanley Clarke, Billy Cobham, Ornette Coleman, Randy Crawford, Dead Can Dance, Miles Davis, Deep Forest, Al Di Meola, George Duke, Marianne Faithfull, Bryan Ferry, Jan Garbarek, Stan Getz, Astrud Gilberto, Dizzy Gillespie, Charlie Haden, Herbie Hancock, Roy Haynes, Al Jarreau, Keith Jarrett, Lenny Kravitz, Ute Lemper, Paco de Lucia, The Manhattan Transfer, Tania Maria, Wynton Marsalis, Massive Attack, Bobby McFerrin, Loreena McKennitt, Brad Mehldau, Pat Metheny, Raul Midón, Marcus Miller, Modern Jazz Quartet, Oscar Peterson, Lou Reed, Dianne Reeves, Ryuichi Sakamoto, Carlos Santana, John Scofield, Simply Red, Roni Size, Patti Smith, Mercedes Sosa, Spyro Gyra, Sting, and Suzanne Vega.

== See also ==
- İzmir European Jazz Festival
- List of jazz festivals in Turkey
