= İzmir European Jazz Festival =

Coordinates: 38°23′54″N 27°04′41″E

- Genre: Jazz
- Dates: March
- Locations: Güzelyalı, İzmir, Turkey
- Years active: 1994-present
- Founders: İzmir Foundation for Culture, Arts and Education (İKSEV)
- Website: www.iksev.org

The İzmir European Jazz Festival, (Turkish: İzmir Avrupa Caz Festivali) is a cultural event held in the first half of every March in İzmir, Turkey. It offers a selection of jazz music performances with the participations of renowned artists and music groups from Europe and Turkey. The festival was first held in 1994 and is organized by the İzmir Foundation for Culture, Arts and Education (Turkish: İzmir Kültür Sanat ve Eğitim Vakfı, İKSEV). It is co-sponsored by the consulates of some European countries in İzmir and Istanbul and is a member of the Union of European Festivals.

The concerts are held at the Ahmed Adnan Saygun Art Center (AASM) in Güzelyalı, İzmir, a 2009-built convention center designed for concerts and similar events having a 1,225-seat large hall, a second 250-seat hall, large exposition areas, and four meeting halls.

From its beginning, the festival hosted artists and groups like Andy Manndorff Jazz Band, Bojan Zulfikarpašić Quartet, George Gruntz Concert Jazz Band Anna Maria Castelli Quartet, Jean-Francois Giansily, Oli Bott, Karlheinz Miklin Trio, Lighea Trio, Dee Dee Bridgewater, Eleftheria Arvanitaki, Manu Codjia, Kristjan Randalu, Bodek Janke, Matthias Schriefl, Ulrich Drechsler Trio, Luigi Campoccia Quartet, Daniele Malvisi, Rossano Gasperini, Paolo Corsi, David Hellbock Trio, Mauro Grossi Quintet, Ernie Watts, Alan Broadbent, Yuri Honing Acoustic Quartet, David Helbock Trio, Edmar Castaneda, Marcin Wasilewsk, Pablo Held Trio, François Cornelup, Claudia Tellini, Nico Gori, Gianni Oddi, Alessandro Bonanno, Ares Tavolazzi and Walter Paoli. The concerts are accompanied by workshops, seminars and photography exhibitions. Jazz historian Francesco Martinelli gives seminars at the Festival and is its program consultant. The flamenco dancer Antonio Najarro and the "Jazzing Flamenco Dance Ensemble" performed also at the festival.

== See also ==
- Istanbul International Jazz Festival
- List of jazz festivals in Turkey
