= Festi Jazz International de Rimouski =

Jazz festival in Canada

Coordinates: 48.4508°N 68.5274°W

Festi Jazz International de Rimouski is a jazz festival held every year from Thursday to Sunday of the first weekend of September in Rimouski, Quebec. The first edition of the festival was held in 1986.

Despite the relatively small size of the city of Rimouski and its distance from major cities, the festival has been a successful cultural event for more than 25 years. Some of the most famous names in jazz have performed at the festival, including Dizzy Gillespie, Stéphane Grappelli and others.
