= DC Jazz Festival =

Annual jazz festival in Washington, D.C.

The DC Jazz Festival, originally the Duke Ellington Jazz Festival, is a jazz festival held in early to mid June for nearly two weeks in Washington, D.C., United States. It was established in 2004 by jazz manager Charles Fishman and changed to its current name in 2010. It is sponsored "with a grant from the National Endowment for the Arts (NEA), the Mid Atlantic Arts Foundation, and by the DC Commission on the Arts and Humanities, an agency supported in part by the National Endowment for the Arts". At least 100 musicians perform annually in venues across the city.
