= Indigo Jazz and Blues Festival =

International jazz and blues festival in Bangalore, India

Indigo Jazz and Blues Festival is an international jazz and blues festival held in Bangalore, India. Held in December, the festival attracts musicians from all over the world. It is organized by Radio Indigo.
