= Mohamed Kacimi =

Algerian novelist and playwright (born 1955)

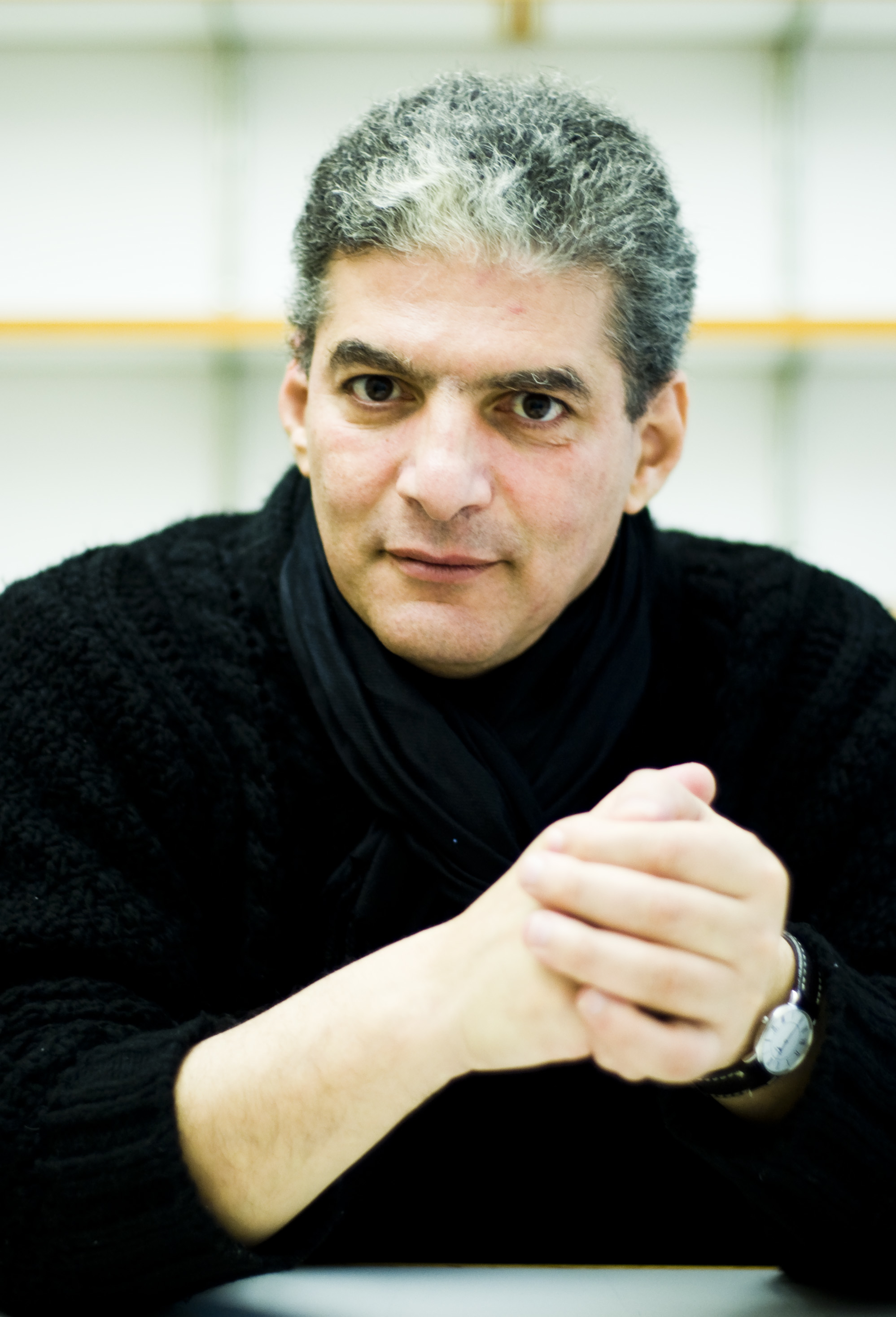
- Mohamed Kacimi in 2008
- Born: 1955 (age 70–71); El Hamel, French Algeria
- Occupations: Novelist, playwright

Mohamed Kacimi (born 1955) is an Algerian novelist and playwright.

== Early life ==
Mohamed Kacimi was born in 1955 in El Hamel, French Algeria. He was raised as a Muslim, and he attended both French and Islamic schools as Zawiyet El Hamel. He emigrated to France in 1981, settling in Paris.

== Career ==
Kacimi is the author of several novels, plays and non-fiction books. His first novel, Le mouchoir, was turned down fourteen times before it was published by L'Harmattan in 1987. His 2006 play, Terre sainte, received a good review from Le Figaro when it was performed in Avignon in 2013. Meanwhile, Kacimi also worked as a translator and a ghostwriter. He was also a contributor to Actuel, a French magazine, and he produced Les Chemins de la connaissance on France Culture. In 2005, he was, with others authors such as Alain Decaux, Richard Millet and Jean-Pierre Thiollet, one of the Beirut Book Fair's guests in the Beirut International Exhibition & Leisure Center, commonly (BIEL).

Kacimi is a critic of Al Jazeera. In the wake of the Charlie Hebdo shooting of 7 January 2015, he wrote a Facebook post relating remarks voiced by teenagers from Val-de-Marne against Charlie Hebdo; however, he was unable to explain where he had heard them specifically, leading Marianne and other media outlets to wonder if he had made them up.

== Works ==
=== Novels ===
- Kacimi, Mohamed (1987). Le mouchoir: roman. Paris: L'Harmattan. ISBN 9782858028290. OCLC 18712177.
- Kacimi, Mohamed (1987). Parole du Qarmate. Paris: L'Harmattan. OCLC 949264366.
- Kacimi, Mohamed (1996). Le jour dernier : roman. Paris: Stock. ISBN 9782234045682. OCLC 34611014.
- Kacimi, Mohamed (2000). La confession d'Abraham : récit-théâtre. Paris: Gallimard. ISBN 9782070759507. OCLC 45171545.
- Kacimi, Mohamed (2007). Cléopâtre, reine d'Egypte. Toulouse: Milan jeunesse. ISBN 9782745926388. OCLC 421703313.
- Kacimi, Mohamed (2007). Beyrouth XXIe siècle. Arles: Actes Sud. ISBN 9782742765218.
- Kacimi, Mohamed (2008). L'Orient après l'amour. Arles: Actes Sud. ISBN 9782742776139.

=== Plays ===
- Kacimi, Mohamed (1998). 1962, c'est quoi l'independance? : la France est partie!. Arles: Actes Sud. ISBN 9782742719068. OCLC 316391120.
- Kacimi, Mohamed (2005). Babel taxi. Carnières-Morlanwelz: Lansman. ISBN 9782872824823. OCLC 64450795.
- Kacimi, Mohamed (2006). Terre sainte. Paris: L'Avant-scène théâtre. ISBN 9782749809700. OCLC 420982885.
- Kacimi, Mohamed (2015). A la table de l'éternité. Paris: Art et comédie. ISBN 9782844229939. OCLC 913193024.

=== Non-fiction ===
- Dragon, Chantal; Kacimi, Mohamed (1990). Arabe, vous avez dit Arabe? : 25 siècles de regards occidentaux sur les Arabes. Paris: Balland. ISBN 9782715808317. OCLC 319828364.
- Dragon, Chantal; Kacimi, Mohamed (1992). Naissance du désert. Paris: Balland. ISBN 9782715809659. OCLC 397950940.
- Kacimi, Mohamed (1997). "À la claire indépendance". In Sebbar, Leïla (ed.). Une enfance algérienne. Paris: Gallimard. ISBN 9782070747160. OCLC 37448508.
- Kacimi, Mohamed (2001). Le monde arabe. Toulouse: Editions Milan. ISBN 9782841134212. OCLC 300181753.
