= Alain Decaux =

French historian

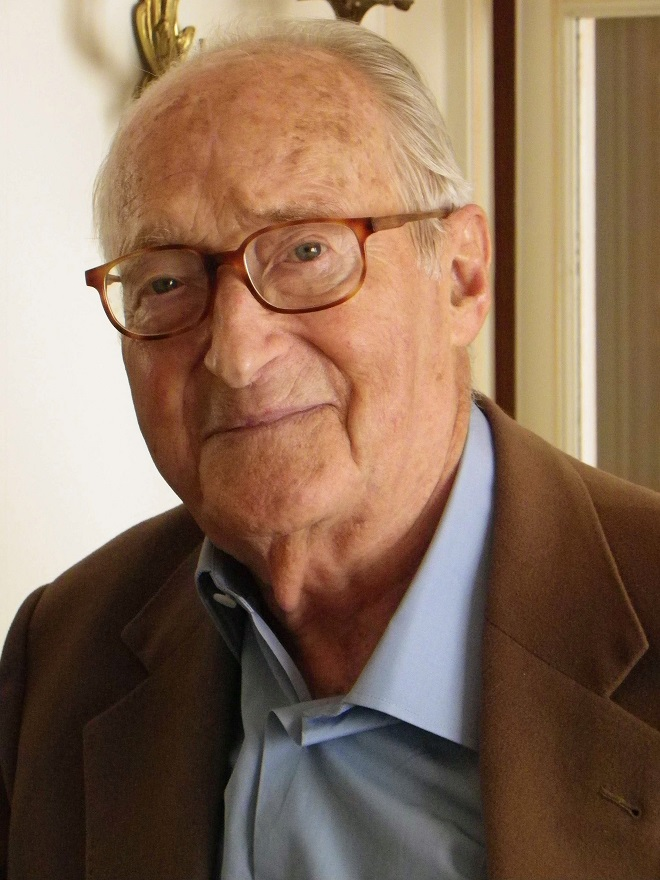
- Alain Decaux in 2011
- Born: 23 July 1925; Lille, France
- Died: 27 March 2016 (aged 90); Paris, France
- Occupations: Historian, writer
- Known for: Member of the Académie française

Alain Decaux (23 July 1925 − 27 March 2016) was a French historian. He was elected to the Académie française on 15 February 1979.

In 2005, he was, with others authors as Frédéric Beigbeder, Mohamed Kacimi, Richard Millet and Jean-Pierre Thiollet, among the Beirut Book Fair's main guests in the Beirut International Exhibition & Leisure Center, commonly (BIEL).

== Bibliography ==
- 1947 Louis XVII retrouvé (Librairie académique Perrin)
- 1949 Létizia. Napoléon et sa mère (Librairie académique Perrin)
- 1951 La Tribune de l'Histoire (in collaboration with André Castelot, J.-C. Simard, and J.-F. Chiappe)
- 1952 La Conspiration du général Malet (Librairie académique Perrin)
- Grave of Alain Decaux in the Père Lachaise cemetery in Paris
  1952 La Médaille militaire (Librairie académique Perrin)
- 1953 La Castiglione, d'après sa correspondence et son journal inédits (Librairie académique Perrin)
- 1954 De l'Atlantide à Mayerling (Librairie académique Perrin)
- 1954 La Belle Histoire de Versailles (Librairie académique Perrin)
- 1956-1957 Énigmes de l'Histoire (in collaboration with Stellio Lorenzi and André Castelot)
- 1957 Cet autre Aiglon, le Prince impérial (Librairie académique Perrin)
- 1957-1966 La caméra explore le temps (in collaboration with Stellio Lorenzi and André Castelot)
- 1958 L'Empire, l'amour et l'argent (Librairie académique Perrin)
- 1958 Offenbach, roi du Second Empire (Librairie académique Perrin)
- 1960 L'Énigme Anastasia, enquête (Librairie académique Perrin)
- 1961 Les Grandes Heures des châteaux de France (in collaboration with J.-F. Chiappe)
- 1962 Secrets d'État (in collaboration with A. Castelot and J.-F. Chiappe)
- 1962 Climats, d'après André Maurois (réalisation de Stellio Lorenzi)
- 1963 La Révolution française (Grand prix du disque)
- 1964 Grands Mystères du passé (Librairie académique Perrin)
- 1964 Les Heures brillantes de la Côte d'Azur (Librairie académique Perrin)
- 1964 Napoléon (Grand prix du disque)
- 1966 Dossiers secrets de l'Histoire (Librairie académique Perrin)
- 1966 Grands secrets, grandes énigmes (Librairie académique Perrin)
- 1967 Nouveaux dossiers secrets (Librairie académique Perrin)
- 1967 J'ai tué Raspoutine (réalisation de Robert Hossein)
- 1968 Grandes aventures de l'Histoire (Librairie académique Perrin)
- 1968 Les Rosenberg ne doivent pas mourir, pièce
- 1968 Les Rosenberg ne doivent pas mourir (Librairie académique Perrin)
- 1969 Le Livre de la famille impériale (in collaboration with André Castelot and Général Kœnig). (Librairie académique Perrin)
- 1969-1981 Alain Decaux raconte
- 1971 La Belle Histoire des marchands de Paris (Librairie académique Perrin)
- 1972 Histoire des Françaises (2 vol.) (Librairie académique Perrin)
- 1975 Le cuirassé Potemkine (in collaboration with R. Hossein and G. Soria)
- 1975-1976 Histoire des Françaises (œuvre radiophonique)
- 1976 Blanqui l'Insurgé (Librairie académique Perrin)
- 1976-1977 Histoire de la France et des Français au jour le jour, (8 vol. in collaboration with André Castelot, Jacques Levron and Marcel Jullian) (Librairie académique Perrin)
- 1977 Les Face à Face de l'Histoire (Librairie académique Perrin)
- 1978 Alain Decaux raconte (Librairie académique Perrin)
- 1978 Notre-Dame de Paris (in collaboration with Robert Hossein and G. Soria)
- 1979 Danton et Robespierre (in collaboration with S. Lorenzi and G. Soria)
- 1979 Alain Decaux raconte (vol. II) (Librairie académique Perrin)
- 1980 Alain Decaux raconte (vol. III) (Librairie académique Perrin)
- 1981 Alain Decaux raconte (vol. IV) (Librairie académique Perrin)
- 1981-1985 L'Histoire en question
- 1982 Les Misérables, d'après Victor Hugo (screenplay, directed by Robert Hossein)
- 1982 L'Histoire en question (Librairie académique Perrin)
- 1983 L'Histoire en question (vol. II) (Librairie académique Perrin)
- 1983 Un homme nommé Jésus
- 1984 Victor Hugo (Librairie académique Perrin)
- 1985 Victor Hugo
- 1985-1987 Le dossier d'Alain Decaux
- 1986 Les Assassins (Librairie académique Perrin)
- 1987 Alain Decaux raconte l'Histoire de France aux enfants (Librairie académique Perrin)
- 1987 L'Affaire du courrier de Lyon (in collaboration with R. Hossein)
- 1987 Destins fabuleux (Librairie académique Perrin)
- 1987-1988 Alain Decaux face à l'histoire
- 1988 La Liberté ou la mort (in collaboration with S. Lorenzi and G. Soria)
- 1988 Alain Decaux raconte la Révolution française aux enfants. (Librairie académique Perrin)
- 1991 Alain Decaux raconte Jésus aux enfants (Librairie académique Perrin)
- 1991 Jésus était son nom
- 1992 Le Tapis rouge (Librairie académique Perrin)
- 1993 Mille neuf cent quarante-quatre (Librairie académique Perrin)
- 1993 Je m'appelais Marie-Antoinette (in collaboration with A. Castelot)
- 1993 Histoires extraordinaires (Librairie académique Perrin)
- 1994 Alain Decaux raconte le débarquement et la Libération
- 1994 Nouvelles histoires extraordinaires (Librairie académique Perrin)
- 1995 L'Abdication (Librairie académique Perrin)
- 1996 C'était le XXe siècle (Librairie académique Perrin)
- 1996 Alain Decaux raconte la Bible aux enfants (Librairie académique Perrin)
- 1997 Monaco et ses princes (Librairie académique Perrin)
- 1997 C'était le XXe siècle : La Course à l'abîme (Librairie académique Perrin)
- 1998 C'était le XXe siècle : La Guerre absolue (Librairie académique Perrin)
- 1999 De gaulle, celui qui a dit non (in collaboration with Alain Peyrefitte)
- 1999 C'était le XXe siècle : De Staline à Kennedy (Librairie académique Perrin)
- 2000 Morts pour Vichy (Librairie académique Perrin)
- 2002 L'Avorton de Dieu. Une vie de saint Paul (Perrin)
- 2002 C'était Bonaparte
- 2005 Tous les personnages sont vrais (Perrin)
- 2007 La révolution de la croix. Néron et les Chrétiens (Perrin)

== Honours and awards ==
- Grand-Croix of the Order of Legion of Honour (2014)
- Grand-Croix of the Ordre National du Mérite (2004)
- Commandeur of the Ordre des Arts et des Lettres
- Grand-Officier of the Order of Prince Henry (Portugal)
- Grand-Officier of the National Order of the Lion (Senegal)
- Officier of the Order of Mono (Togo)
- Officier of the Order of Valour (Cameroon)
