= Beirut Nights =

Events in Beirut, Lebanon

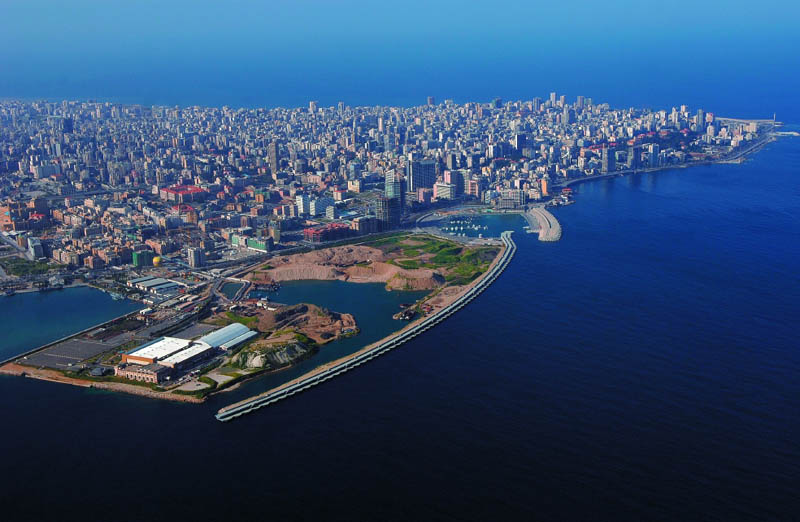
Beirut Central District where most festivals are held in Beirut.

The Beirut Nights are numbers of events that take place from time to time in Beirut, Lebanon. It's usually active in the summer; however, some other festivals might happen in spring or fall. Beirut Central District has been chosen for many times to hold such occasions whereas others preferred to have their "nights" in bars and nightclubs.

Many theatre plays have been part of such events by the passage of time like La Comédie Française. On the other hand, highlights of downtown Beirut are considered to be related to youth culture while the Byblos International Festival, the Baalbeck International Festival and the Beiteddine Festival are the base of classical highlights in Lebanon.

The 2000 AFC Asian Cup was also held in Beirut and basically in Camille Chamoun Sports City Stadium. The National Museum of Beirut is the principal archaeology museum in the country where artistic paintings, statues and Literature are found. The current exhibition numbers 1300 artifacts dating from prehistoric times to the Arab conquest. On 21 May 2008, the opposition ended its sit-in which begun at 1 December 2006 in downtown Beirut; which refreshed the center of the city.

== Highlights ==
In 1999, Luciano Pavarotti performed a charity benefit concert in Beirut, to mark Lebanon's reemergence on the world stage after the civil war. The concert held in Beirut was attended by 20,000 people. In 2004, Mariah Carey made her debut in the Arab world with a concert; she performed her hits "Butterfly", "Hero" and "Dreamlover". Phil Collins was another celebrity to visit Lebanon on 5 November 2005. Collins was a part of a charity concert for children cancer at BIEL; that went to the Children's Cancer Center Of Lebanon. This concert was a part of Phil Collins's First Final Farewell Tour. By the summer of 2005, Tiësto made his first appearance in Lebanon.

On 10 June 2006 rapper 50 Cent and the G-UNIT performed their first concert in the Arab world at the BIEL in the Beirut Central District. On 12 April 2008, David Guetta made his way to Beirut at BIEL. Guetta appeared along with his wife Cathy and performed hits such as "Love Is Gone" and "The World Is Mine".

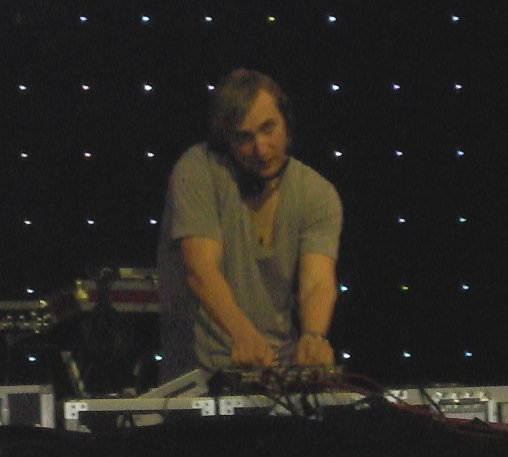
David Guetta

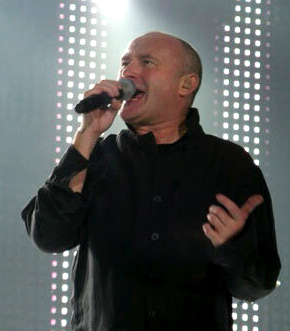
Phil Collins

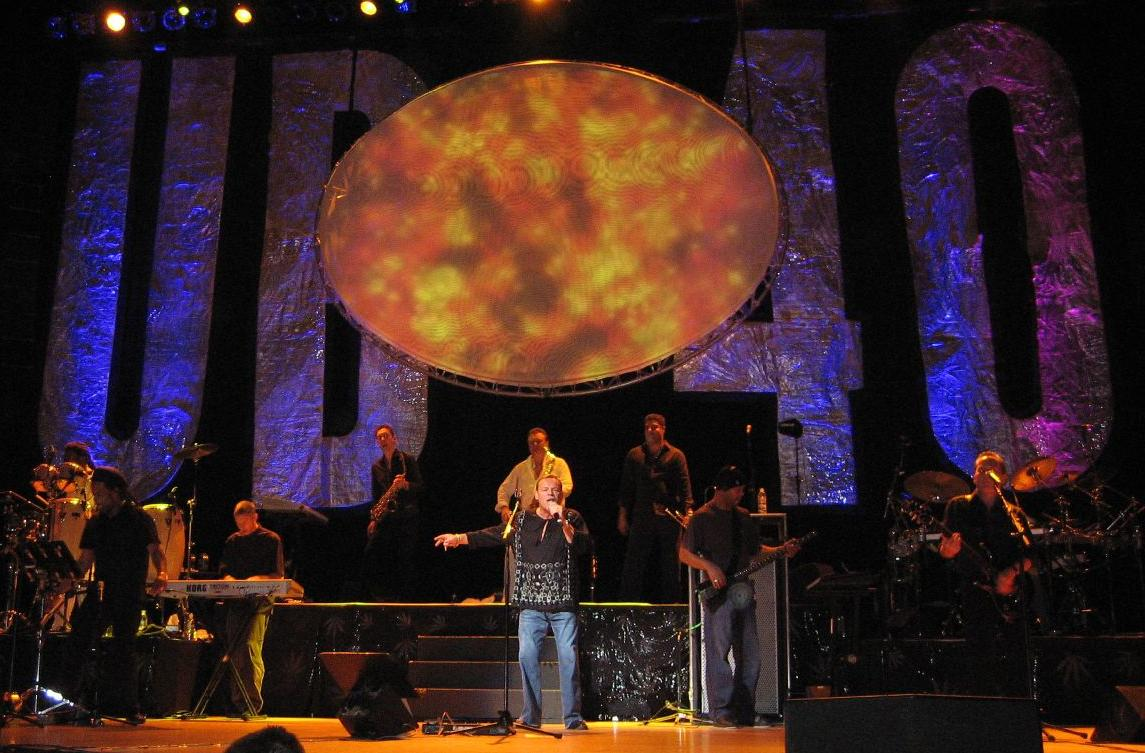
UB40

== See also ==
- Byblos
- Beirut International Exhibition & Leisure Center
