= Viam =

- Commune
- Coat of arms
- Location of Viam
- Location within France Location within Nouvelle-Aquitaine
- Coordinates: 45°36′36″N 1°53′04″E
- Country: France
- Region: Nouvelle-Aquitaine
- Department: Corrèze
- Arrondissement: Tulle
- Canton: Plateau de Millevaches
- Intercommunality: Vézère-Monédières-Millesources

Government
  - Mayor (2026–32): Chrystel Lariviere
- Area^{1}: 29.99 km^{2} (11.58 sq mi)
- Highest elevation: 850 m (2,790 ft)
- Lowest elevation: 632 m (2,073 ft)
- Population (2023): 85
  - Density: 2.8/km^{2} (7.3/sq mi)
- Time zone: UTC+01:00 (CET)
  - Summer (DST): UTC+02:00 (CEST)
- INSEE/Postal code: 19284 /19170
- ^{1} French Land Register data, which excludes lakes, ponds, glaciers > 1 km^{2} (0.386 sq mi or 247 acres) and river estuaries.

Viam (French pronunciation: [vjɑ̃]) is a commune in the Corrèze department in central France. The village is positioned on a lake, used for swimming, fishing, water-skiing, canoeing, kayaking, sailing and land activities such as hiking and cycling.

== History ==
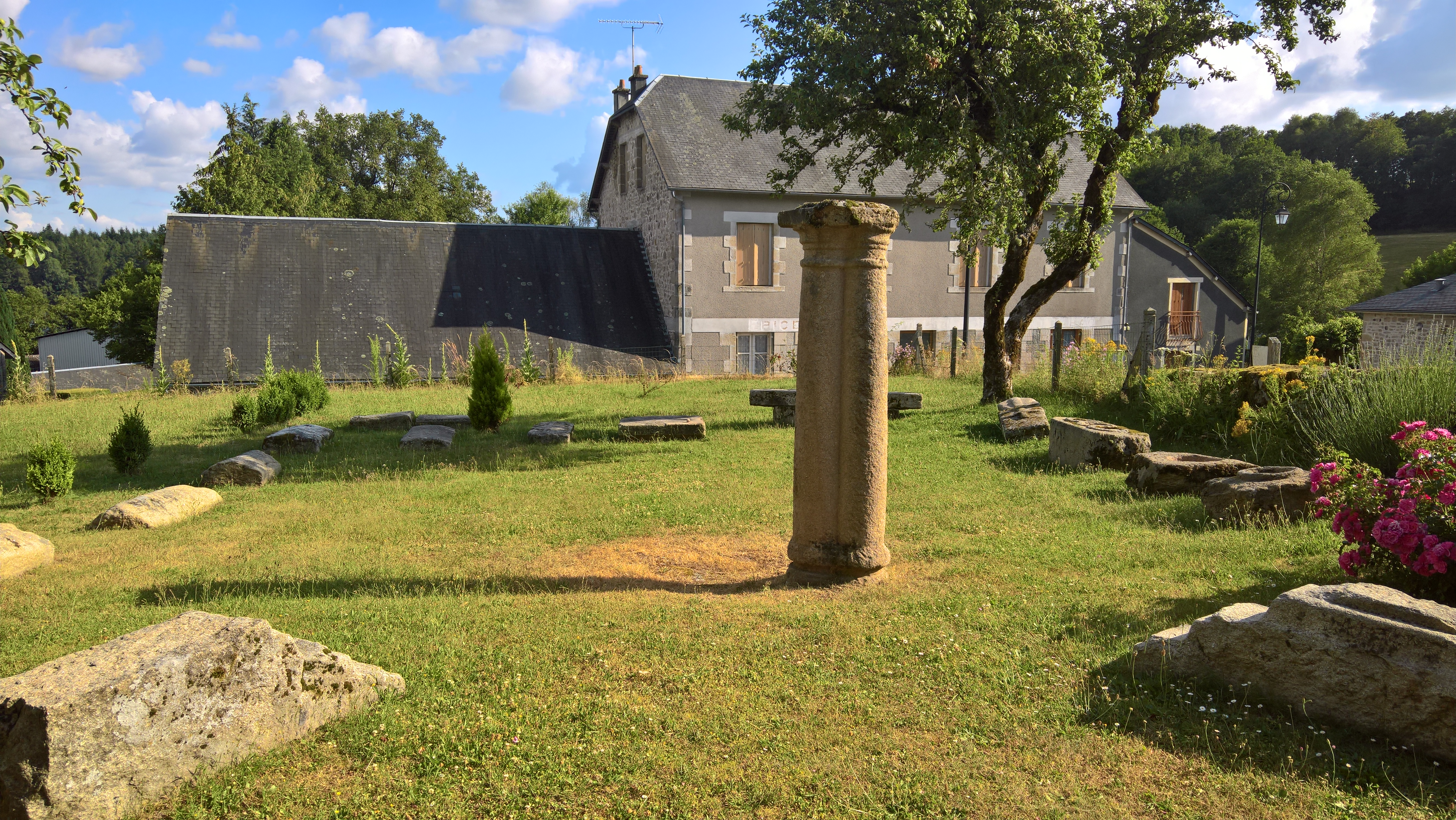
Gallo-Roman remains

The earliest human traces go back to the Neolithic period. Two polished axes and carved flints were discovered at six locations. In the Gallo-Roman period, a route from Limoges crossed the commune. Seven sites have remains of Gallo-Roman construction, the most important occupying the Plateau du Domaine de Plazanet where a double column was uncovered. Two cremated burial sites were discovered nearby. One, dated to the 1st century A.D., rested under a 15 metre diameter mound of earth. The other, consisting of a granite burial chest, dates from the end of the 2nd century. Another special burial chest includes three receptacles.

The parish of Viam seems to originate from the year 1000. In 1154, a bull from Pope Adrian IV, confirms the church as the property of the Abbey of Tulle. In the village of Plazanet, sixteen silos, divided into three groups, belonging to a farm of that time. Near the village of Monceaux, the remains of a castle occupy a promontory dominating the Vézère river. In 1514, a Laurent de Monceaux was a curate at Viam. In the middle of the 14th century, the Château de Monceaux, owned by the Lord Murat de Tarnac, was sold to the Comte family, a middle-class family in Treignac and elevated to the nobility thereafter. At the end of the seventeenth century, the coat of arms of Sir Pierre Comte of Monceaux de Viam was blazoned with d'argent à un arbre de sinople.

== Geography ==
Viam is a commune in the Massif Central located on the Plateau de Millevaches. The commune is also located in the parc naturel régional de Millevaches en Limousin (Regional Nature Park of Millevaches in the Limousin). The village is at an altitude of 680 metres and sits next to an artificial lake.

== Population ==
Historical population
Year	Pop.	±% p.a.
1968	213	—
1975	160	−4.00%
1982	141	−1.79%
1990	133	−0.73%
1999	132	−0.08%
2007	118	−1.39%
2012	110	−1.39%
2017	93	−3.30%
2023	85	−1.49%
Source: INSEE

== Places and monuments ==
=== Église de Viam ===
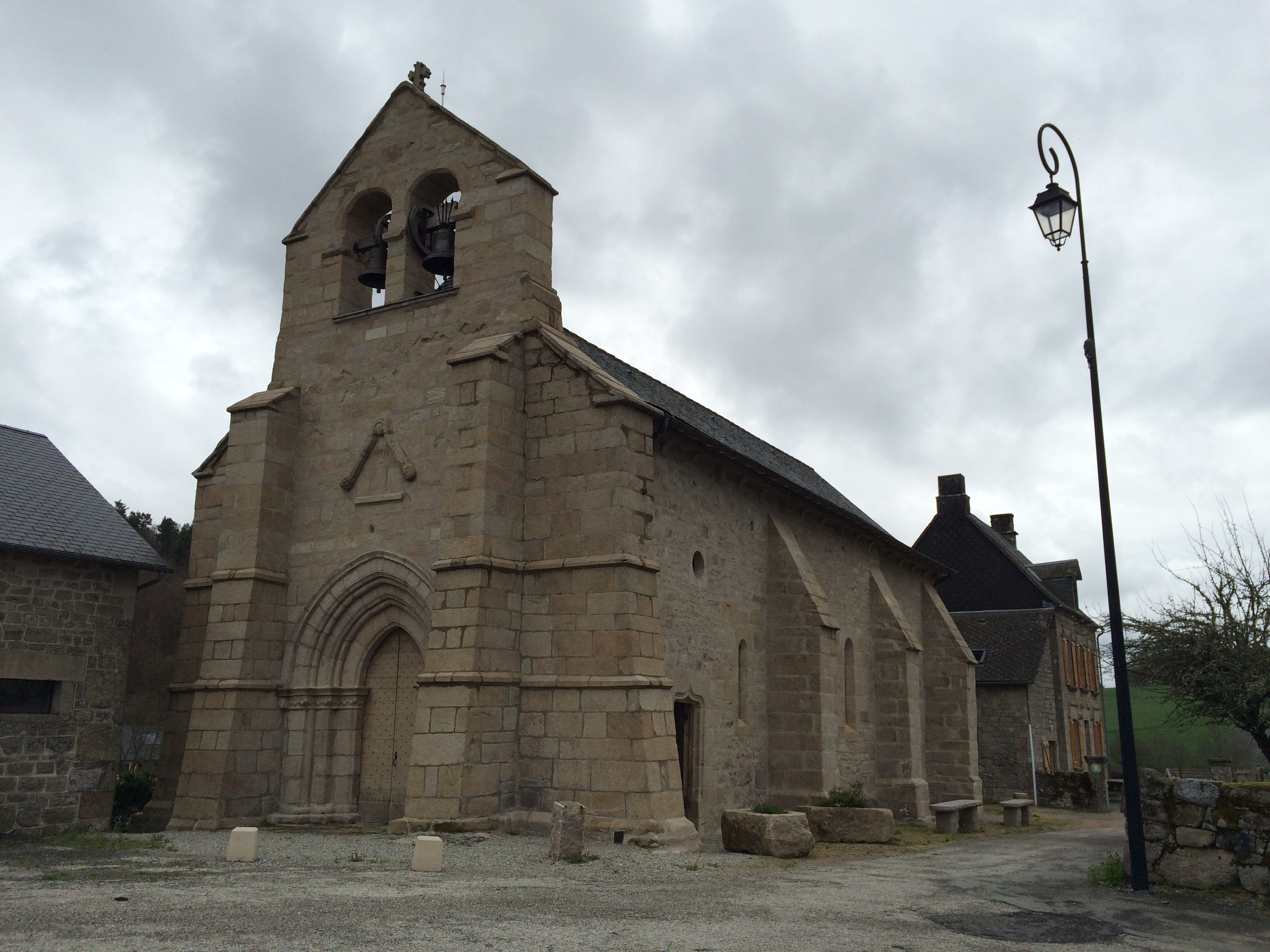
Church of Saint-Martin de Viam

The parish church of Viam was probably built in the 12th century, as mentioned in its general structure. It is built on a rocky headland, all its walls resting on it. Well situated, it dominates the lake, the village square and the surrounding buildings.

Essentially Romanesque, with thick walls, narrow openings on the south side, a half-circular apse, quite rare in the Corrèze and corbels of different profiles reign under the cornice. The interior building is 22m long, and the width and the average height are 5m. The church is composed of a single nave, three bays and six columns, including the marquees are adorned with stylised volutes, of Gothic art. The original ceiling was made of wood, as in many Romanesque churches of their time, but in the 13th and 14th centuries, it was replaced by a Gothic-style stone vault with crossed ogival arches. At the time the church was revamped, a Gothic style is also found on the main entrance and the right side door.

The two-level steeple-wall is flanked by an imposing buttress. On its upper part, there is a double arched arcade in which two bells hang. One, dating back to 1581, weighs 120 kg. The other, weighing 245 kg, dates from 1866. The entrance porch has a semi-circular tympanum; it is topped by a triangular pediment in a lesser relief that houses a shell. The Church of Saint-Martin was classified as a historic monument in 1976.

=== Buildings ===
Throughout the territory of the commune of Viam, there are many crosses, often in granite in various forms. The house of Valentin Didey and Eugène Leblanc is located by the lake.

=== Dam ===
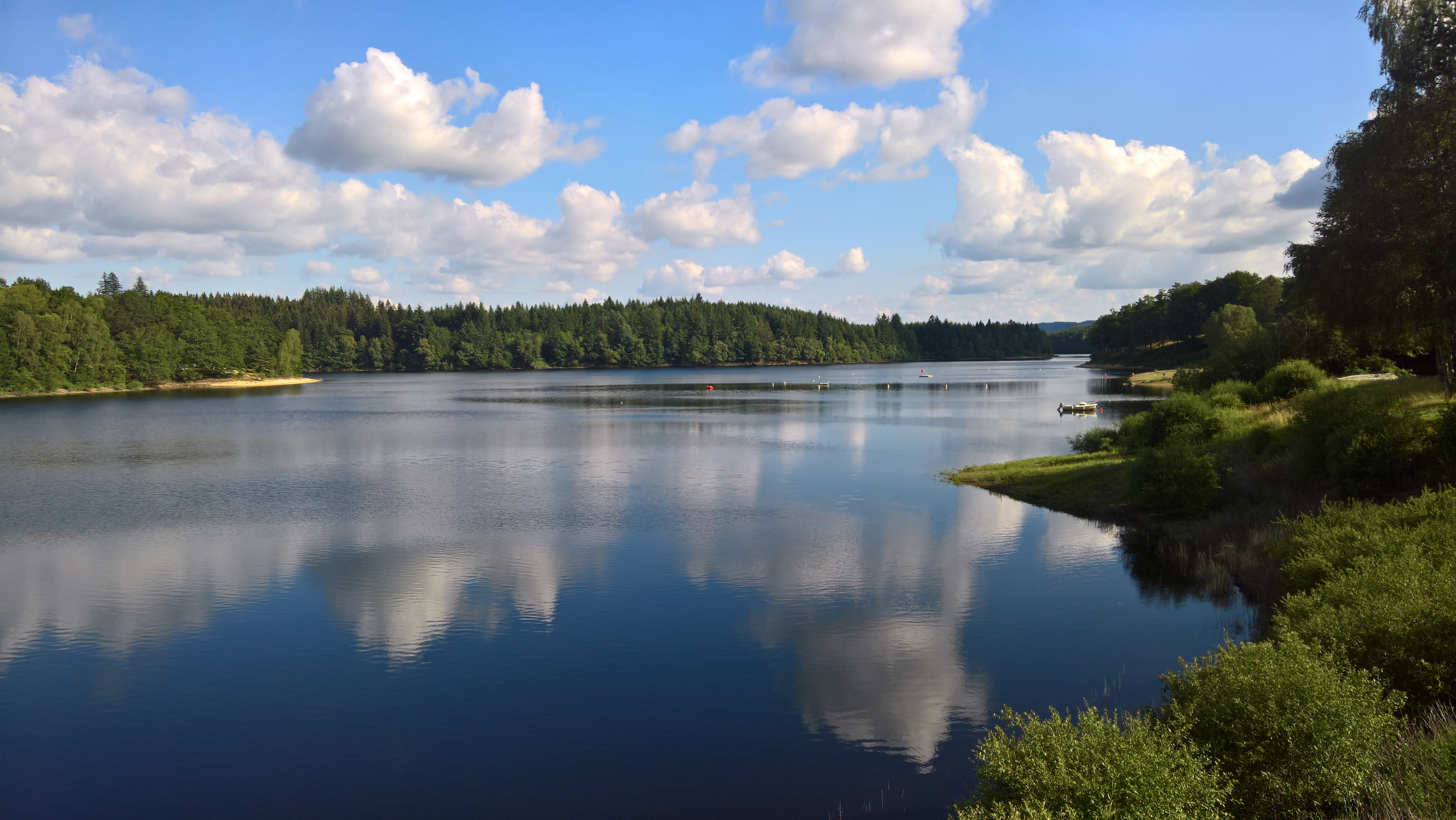
Lake at Viam

The EDF dam of Monceaux-La-Virole was built on the Vézère River. Construction work on the dam began in 1940. The area was filled with water in 1946.

Details:

- Dam height on foundations: 34 m
- Lake area: 183 ha
- Holding Volume (maximum shore): 20 million m^{3}
- Normal river flow rate: 6.7 m^{3}/s
- Maximum river flow rate: 140 m^{3}/s
- Water intake: 13 m^{3}/s

== Notable people ==
- Richard Millet
- Geneviève Fourgnaud, painter

== See also ==
=== Popular patronage for the Church of Viam ===
The Church of Viam is the oldest building in the commune. Since the beginning of the 1990s, several studies and reports have highlighted the urgency of restoration, of what constitutes the architectural memory of Viam.

To carry out this project valued at €683,000, the municipality obtained the assistance of the State (50%), the Regional Council of the Limousin (10%) and the General Council of the Corrèze (17.5%). However, the remaining share of the expense for the municipality remains high for its 120 inhabitants.

In partnership with the la Fondation du Patrimoine, the municipality of Viam and the association Les Gens de Viam, they have decided to launch a large public subscription, which appeals to popular patronage, in order to lighten this municipal charge. Everyone, individuals, businesses, professions, associations, will be able to participate in this great project of safeguarding and valuing the national heritage of proximity.

== See also ==
- Communes of the Corrèze department
