= Richard Millet =

French author (born 1953)

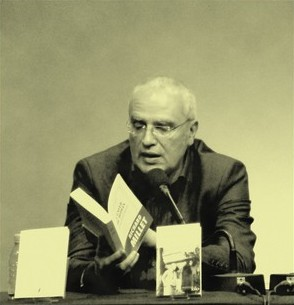
Richard Millet

Richard Millet (French: [ʁiʃaʁ mijɛ]; born 1953) is a French author.

== Biography ==
=== Early life ===
He was born in Viam, Corrèze in 1953. He spent part of his childhood in the neighborhood of Badaro in Beirut, Lebanon.

=== Work and career ===
In 1994, he won the Essay Prize from the Académie Française for his book Le Sentiment de la langue (“The Feeling of Language”).

Several of Millet's novels are set in the village of Siom (Viam's literary counterpart), including La Gloire des Pythre (“The Glory of the Pythres”), L'Amour des trois sœurs Piale (“The Love of the Three Piale Sisters”), Lauve le pur (“Lauve the Pure”), and Ma vie parmi les ombres (“My Life Among the Shadows”). More generally, the Plateau de Millevaches - its landscape, climate, geographic location and the evolution of the lives of its inhabitants over the course of the century - is an essential element in his work, as Haute-Provence was for Giono, the county of Yoknapatawpha for Faulkner or Wessex for Thomas Hardy.

Millet mixes religious elements with coarse language, evoking the French Catholic tradition in a way that acknowledges the modern sexual revolution. Desire, suffering and evil are themes that permeate all of his work.

He is also an editor at Gallimard, where he played a decisive role in the publication of Jonathan Littell's novel Les Bienveillantes, which won the 2006 Prix Goncourt.

In 2005, he was with others authors as Alain Decaux, Frédéric Beigbeder and Jean-Pierre Thiollet one of the Beirut Book Fair's guests in the Beirut International Exhibition & Leisure Center, commonly (BIEL).

The September 2007 publication of Désenchantement de la littérature, in which he denounces the inanity of contemporary French literature and the loss of religious feeling in the West, generated a good deal of controversy.

=== Defense of Anders Behring Breivik ===
In July 2012, Millet published Éloge littéraire d'Anders Breivik, a condemnation of the actions of Anders Behring Breivik and a critical exploration of his ideology, as part of a collection of essays. In Éloge he asks why the Breivik case happened today, in Norway. He describes Breivik's victims as "mixed-raced, globalized, uncultivated, social-democrat petit bourgeois." In the same essay, he also argues that the Norwegian massacre was the result of a weakened European identity, cultural decay, mass immigration and multiculturalism, and calls Breivik's mass murders "formal perfection ... in their literary dimension". Referring to the controversy that followed, Millet stated "I'm one of the most hated French authors. It's an interesting position that makes me an exceptional being." The book was condemned as a "fascist pamphlet" by the author Annie Ernaux.

Despite the controversy, Millet continued to publish and in 2015 won the Prix de littérature André-Gide for his book Sibelius : Les Cygnes et le Silence.

== Bibliography ==
- L'Invention du corps de saint Marc, POL (1983)
- L'Innocence, POL (1984)
- Sept passions singulières, POL (1985)
- Le plus haut miroir, Fata Morgana (1986)
- Le Sentiment de la langue I, Champ Vallon (1986)
- Beyrouth, Champ Vallon (1987), repris dans Un Balcon à Beyrouth, followed by Beyrouth ou la séparation, La Table Ronde (2005)
- L'Angélus, POL (1988) and "Folio" (2001)
- La Chambre d'ivoire, POL (1989) and "Folio" (2001)
- Le Sentiment de la langue II, Champ Vallon (1990)
- Langue Fantôme, Essai sur la paupérisation de la littérature suivi de Éloge littérature d'Anders Breivik, Pierre-Guillaume de Roux (2012)
- Laura Mendoza, POL (1991)
- Accompagnement, POL (1991)
- L'Ecrivain Sirieix, POL (1992), "Folio" (2001)
- Le Chant des adolescentes, POL (1993)
- Le Sentiment de la langue, I, II, III, La Table Ronde (1993 and 2003)
- Un Balcon à Beyrouth, La Table Ronde (1994 et 2005)
- Cœur blanc, POL (1994)
- La Gloire des Pythre, POL (1995), "Folio" (1997)
- L'Amour mendiant, POL (1996), "Folio" (2007)
- L'Amour des trois sœurs Piale, POL (1997), "Folio" (1999)
- Cité perdue, Fata Morgana (1998)
- Le Cavalier siomois, Editions François Janaud (1998), La Table Ronde (2004)
- Autres jeunes filles (with illustrations by Ernest Pignon-Ernest), Editions François Janaud (2000)
- Lauve le pur, POL (2000), "Folio" (2001)
- La Voix d'alto, Gallimard (2001), "Folio" (2003)
- Le Renard dans le nom, Gallimard (2003), "Folio" (2004)
- Ma vie parmi les ombres, Gallimard (2003), "Folio" (2005)
- Fenêtre au crépuscule. Conversation avec Chantal Lapeyre-Desmaison, La Table Ronde (2004)
- Musique secrète, Gallimard (2004)
- Pour la musique contemporaine, Fayard (2004)
- Le Dernier écrivain, Fata Morgana (2005)
- Harcèlement littéraire. Entretiens avec Delphine Descaves et Thierry Cecille, Gallimard (2005)
- Le Goût des femmes laides, Gallimard (2005), "Folio" (2007)
- Sacrifice, on the photographs of Silvia Seova, L'Archange Minotaure (2006)
- Dévorations, Gallimard (2006)
- L'Art du bref, Gallimard, (2006)
- Place des Pensées. Sur Maurice Blanchot, Gallimard (2007)
- Petit éloge d'un solitaire, Gallimard, "Folio" (2007)
- L'Orient désert, Mercure de France (2007)
- Désenchantement de la littérature, Gallimard (2007)

== Critical Studies ==
- Sylviane Coyault-Dublanhet, La Province en héritage. Pierre Michon, Pierre Bergounioux, Richard Millet, Genève, Droz, 2002, 289 p.
- Jean-Yves Laurichesse, Richard Millet. L'invention du pays, Amsterdam - New York, Rodopi, 2007, 276 p.
- Ján Drengubiak, Richard Millet, du personnel vers l’universel. Prešov, Acta Facultatis Philosophicae Universitatis Prešoviensis, 2012. 189 p.
