= Horsh Beirut =

Park in Beirut, Lebanon

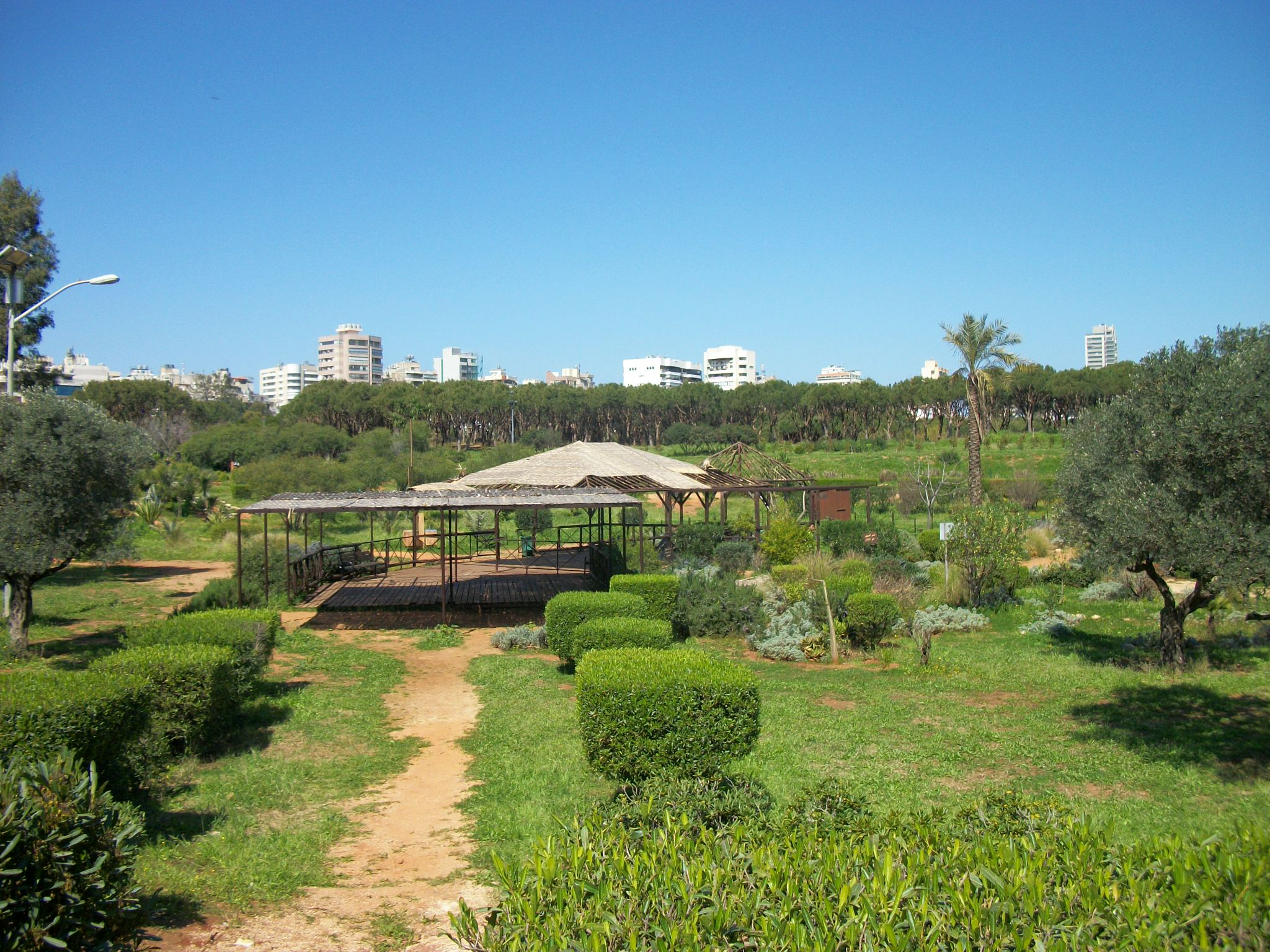
- Interactive map of Horsh Beirut
- Location: Beirut
- Coordinates: 33°52′16″N 35°30′36″E

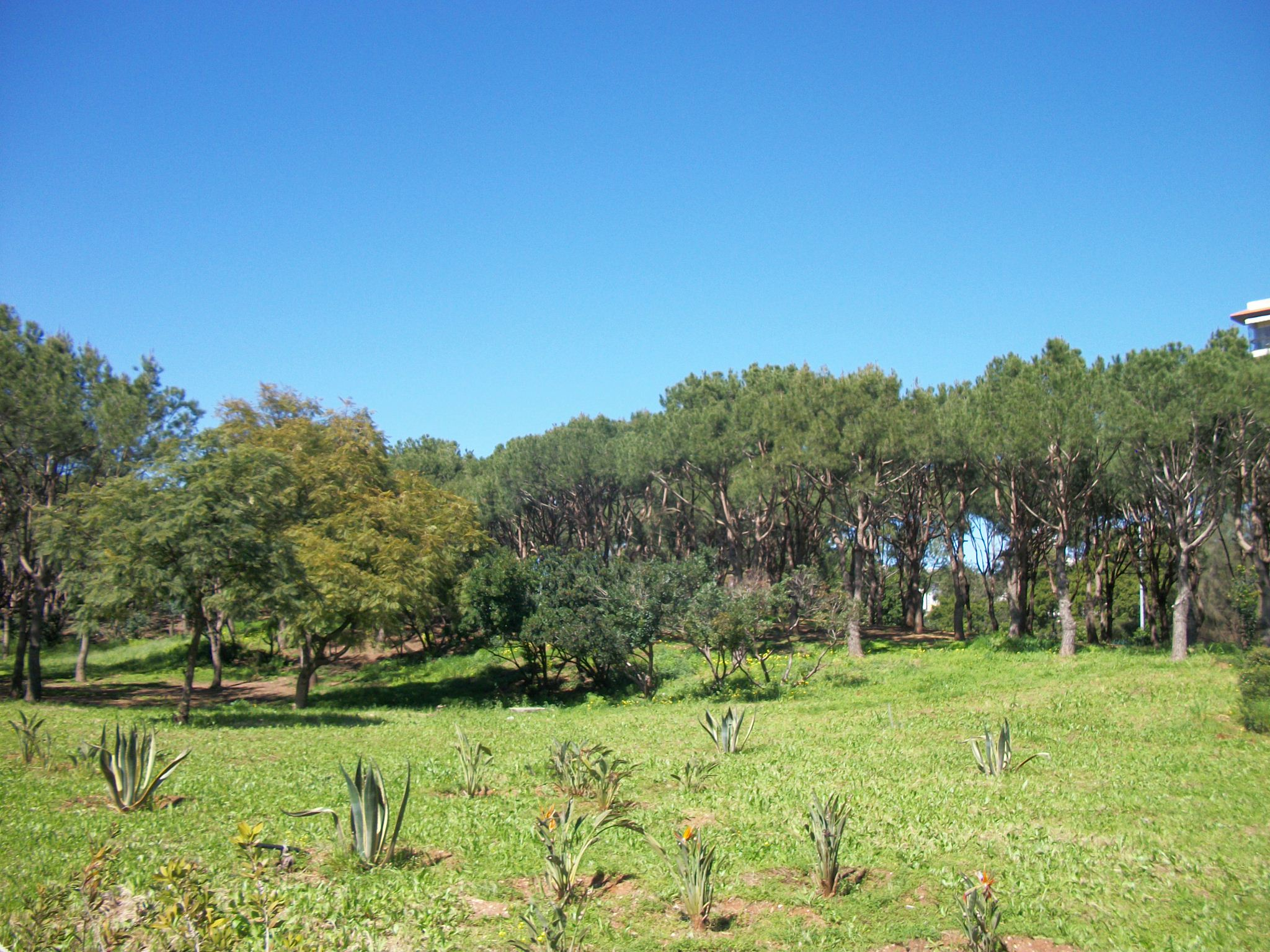
Center of the park in Beirut, Lebanon.

Horsh Beirut (Arabic: حرش بيروت) is an urban park in the heart of the capital of Lebanon, Beirut. The urban park is also known as Horsh El Snaubar (Arabic: حرش الصنوبر or French: Bois de Pins). The park covers about 0.3 square kilometres (0.12 sq mi) of green space within municipal Beirut.

== History ==
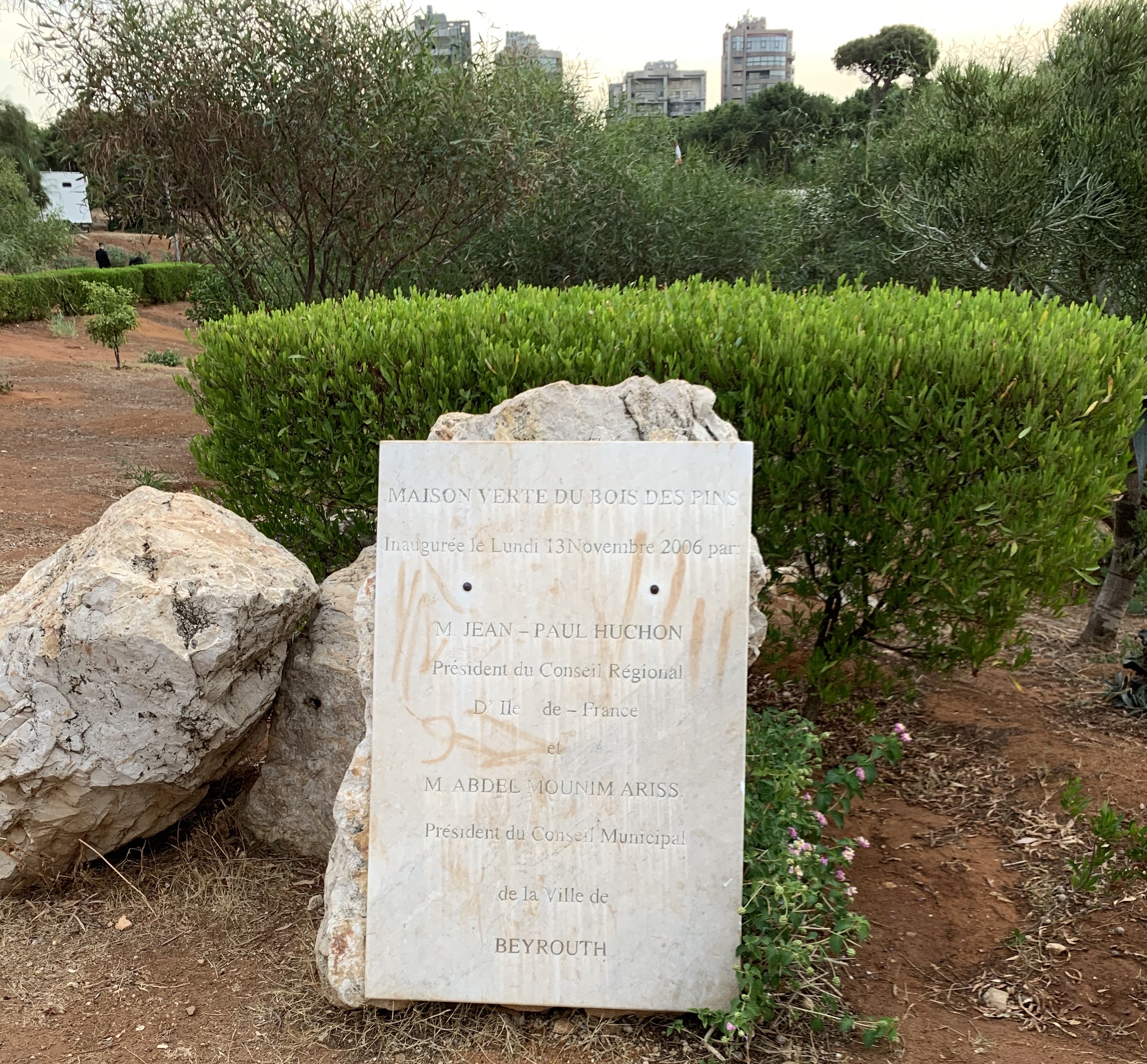
Jean-Paul Huchon, the French civil administrator and politician's dedication plaque on Beirut's National Park.

In the 13th century, William of Tyre (or Latin: Willelmus Tyrensis), the medieval prelate, chronicler and the archbishop of Tyre, named the forest of Beirut, as "La Pinée" or "Sapinoie".

The park, Horsh, has suffered throughout history from frequent abuse of its timber especially by the armies of the Crusaders, Mamluks, Ottomans, and the Allies of World War II to build ships and weapons. Large parts of the pine forest were segmented-out to become an Ottoman Casino in 1917 (which became the Pine Residence later during the French Mandate of Lebanon), a horse racecourse in 1921, Al-Shohadaa Cemetery in 1958, and Rawdat al-Shaheedein Cemetery in the 1970s. Moreover, the development of new roads during the 1950s state planning produced some leftovers of the remaining woodland that became subject to conflict and appropriation.

Horsh was bombed to burn by Israeli jet fighters during the 1982 Israeli invasion of Lebanon. Much of it was also turned into a Palestinian refugee camp. From a pine forest over 1,250,000 m^{2} in 1696 it decreased to a park over 800,000 m^{2} in 1967 (≈ 5% of Municipal Beirut),

Today, Horsh Beirut is a 0.3-square-kilometre (0.12 sq mi) triangular park at the southern border of the city limited by Omar Beyhum Street, 22 November Avenue, Abdelnasser Avenue and National Museum of Beirut (Musée national de Beyrouth).

The park, or Horsh Beirut, has been reconstructed after the end of the Lebanese Civil War and it has been closed for the general public for about 25 years. Lebanese citizens had to apply for a permission and only have chances to get one if they are older than 35 years. At the same time there have been reports of Western foreigners getting permission while applications by Lebanese were rejected. Beirut residents have repeatedly protested against the denial of access to the park including the unequal access policies for Western and non-Western park visitors. However, it ended up being reopened to the public by the governor of Beirut, Ziad Chebib, on September 3, 2015.

== Image gallery ==
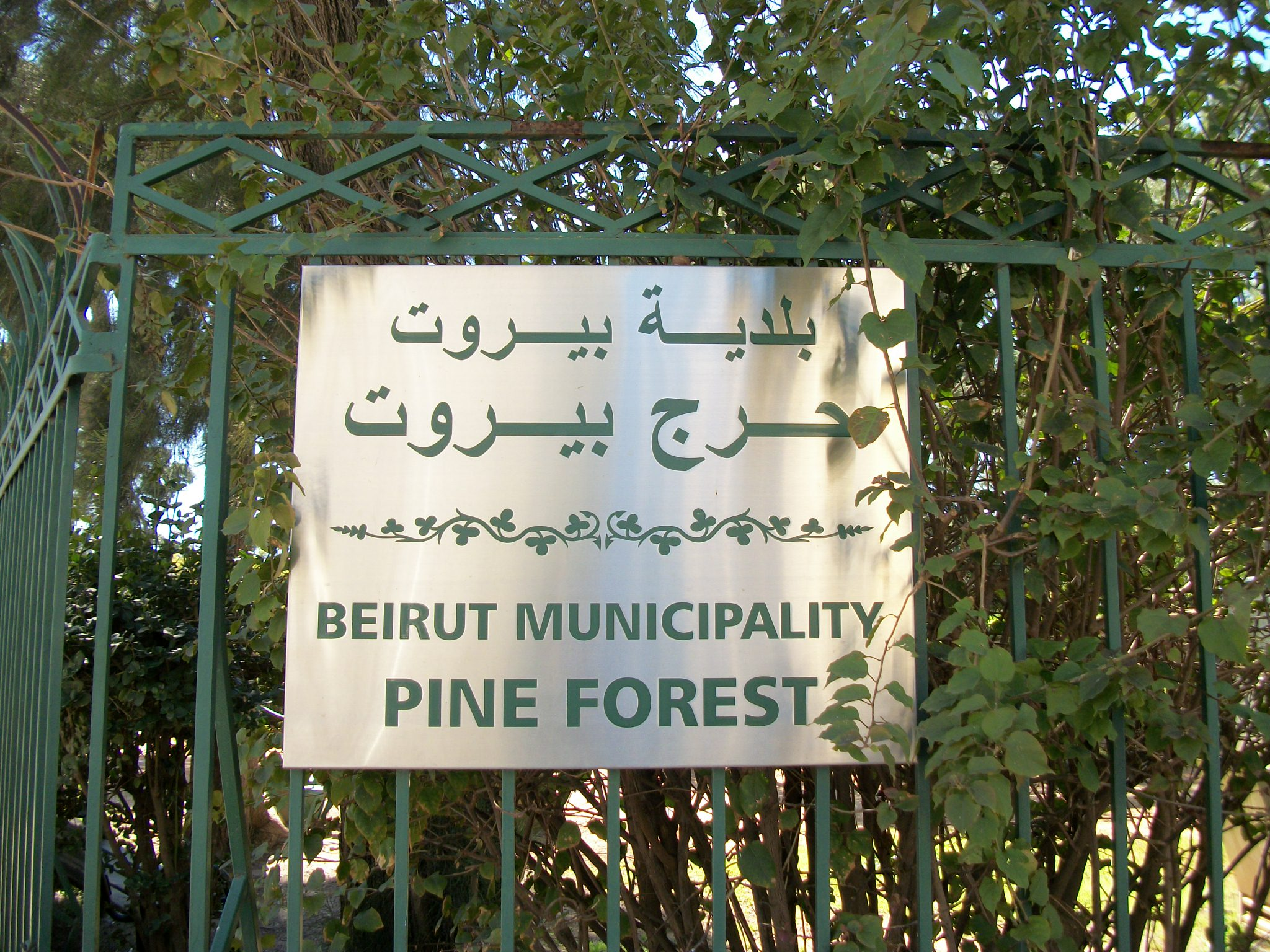
Information sign at the park gate from Badaro area

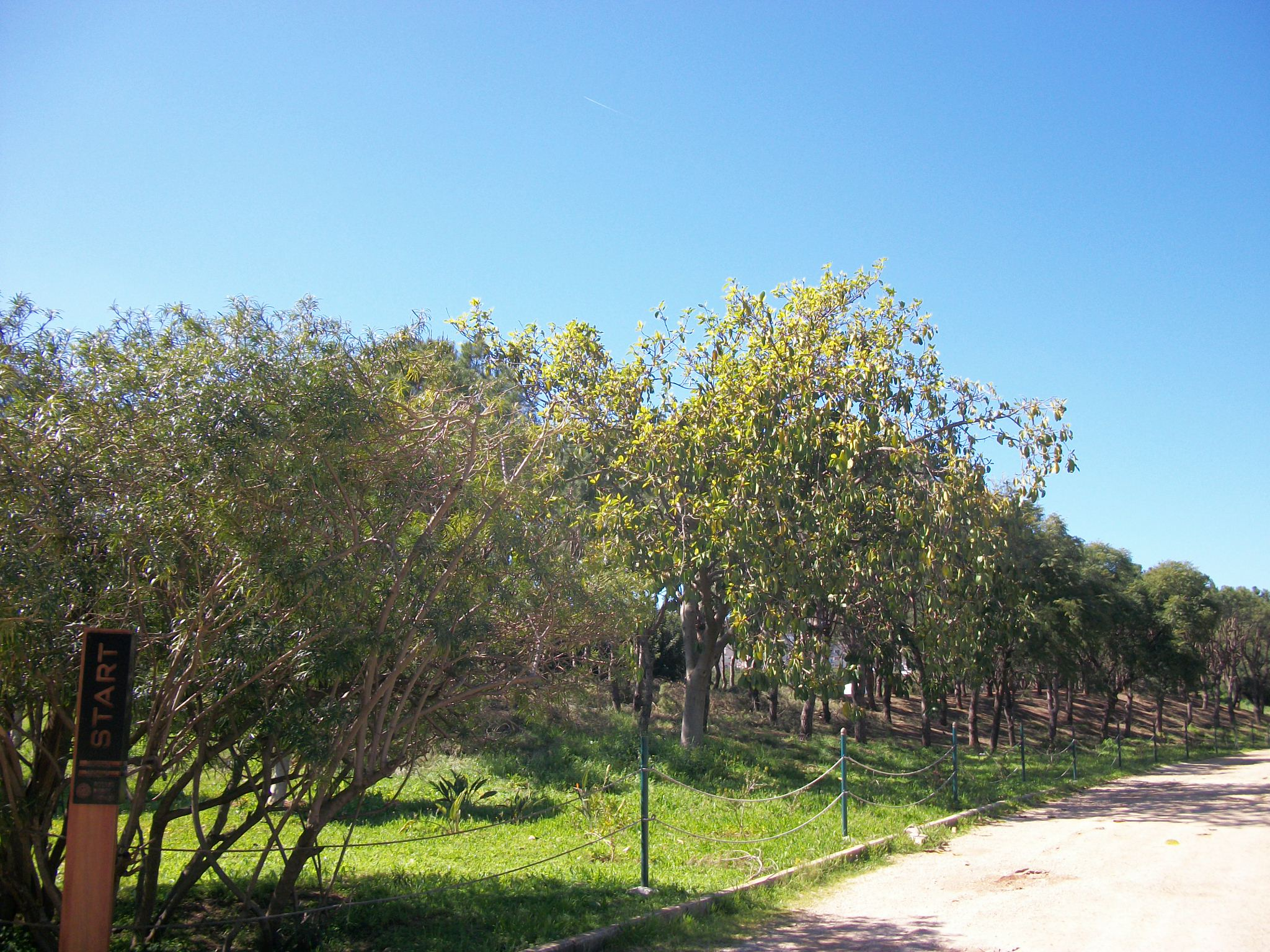
Center of the park

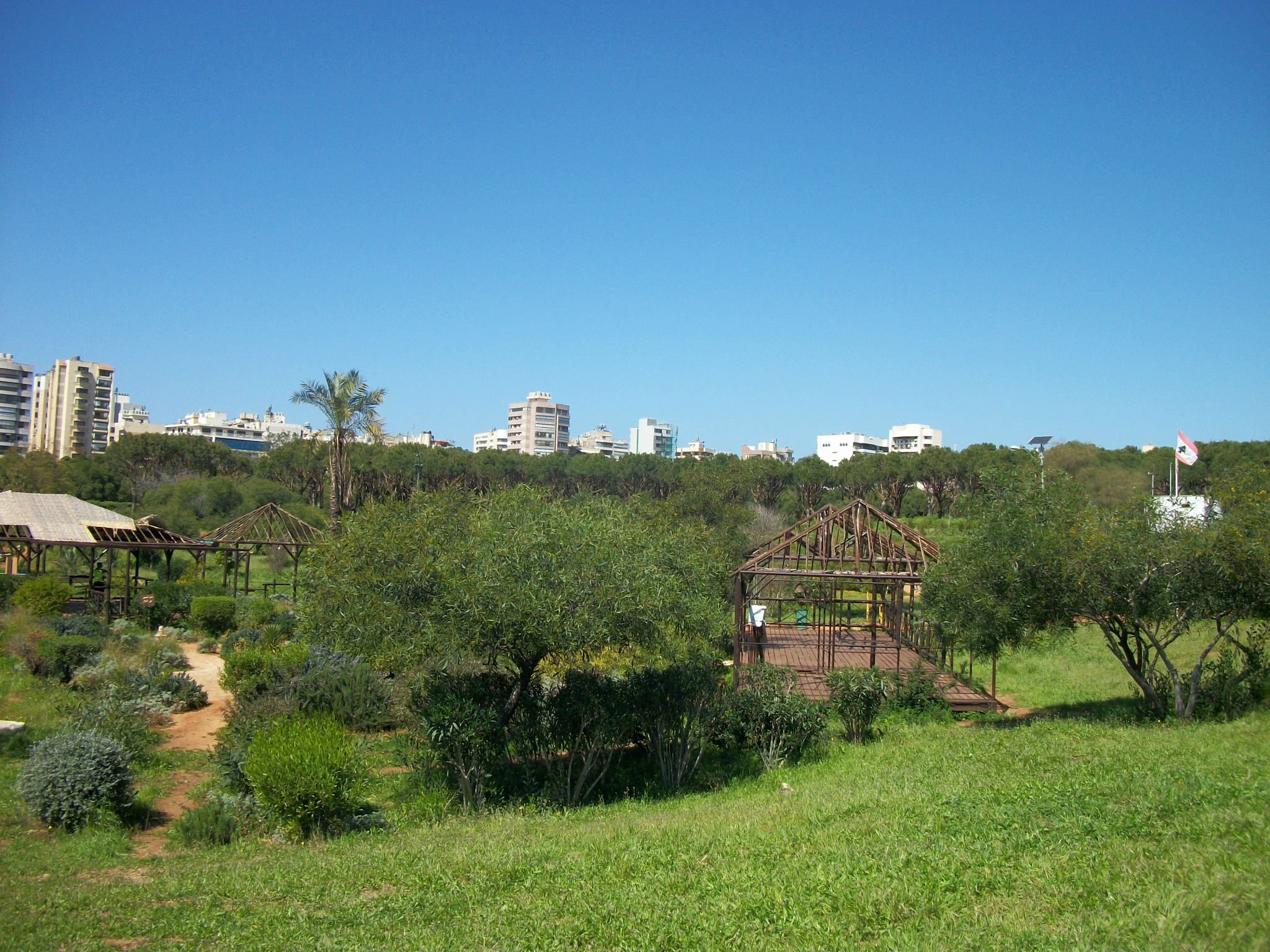
Center of the park

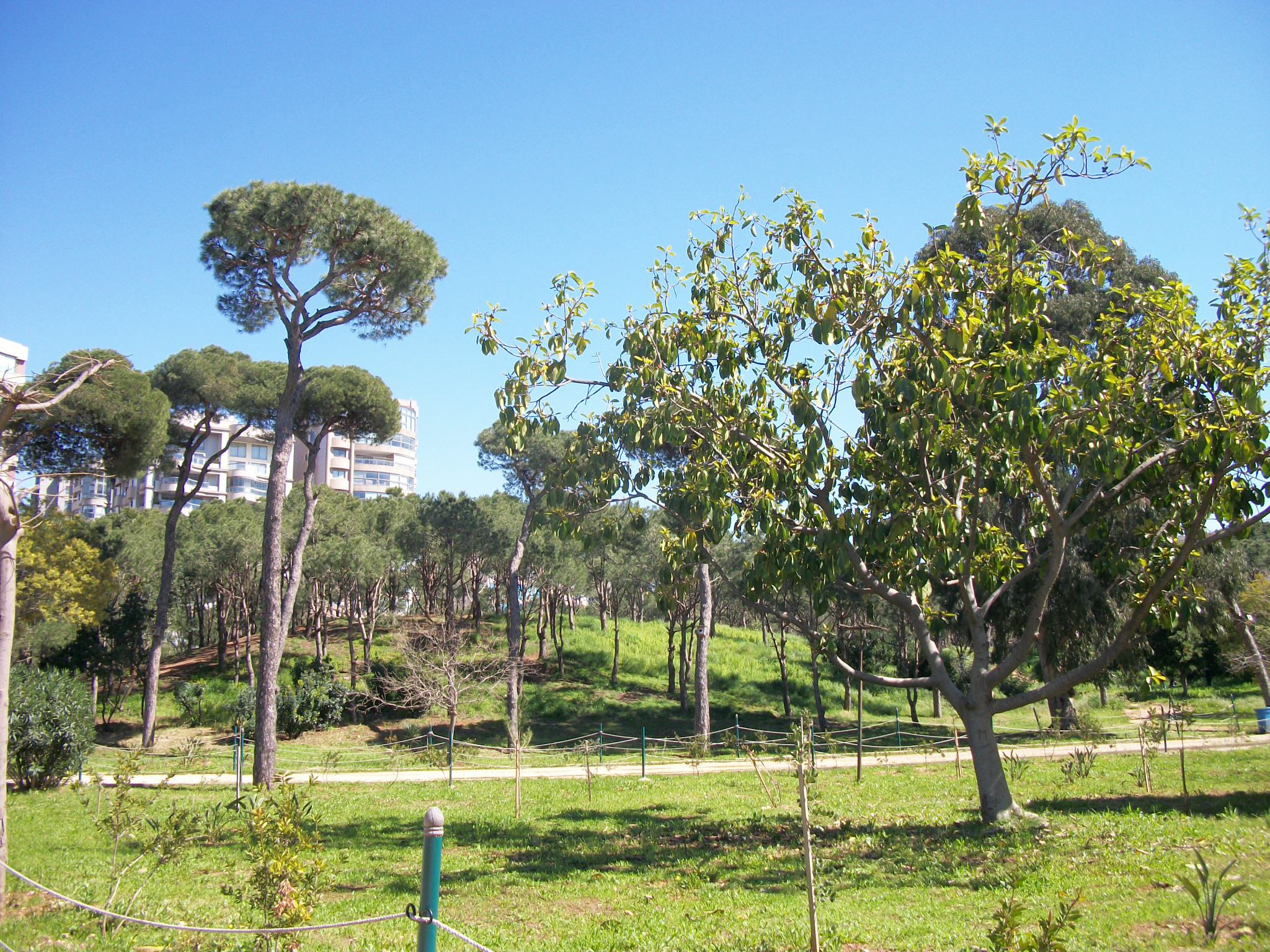
Center of the park

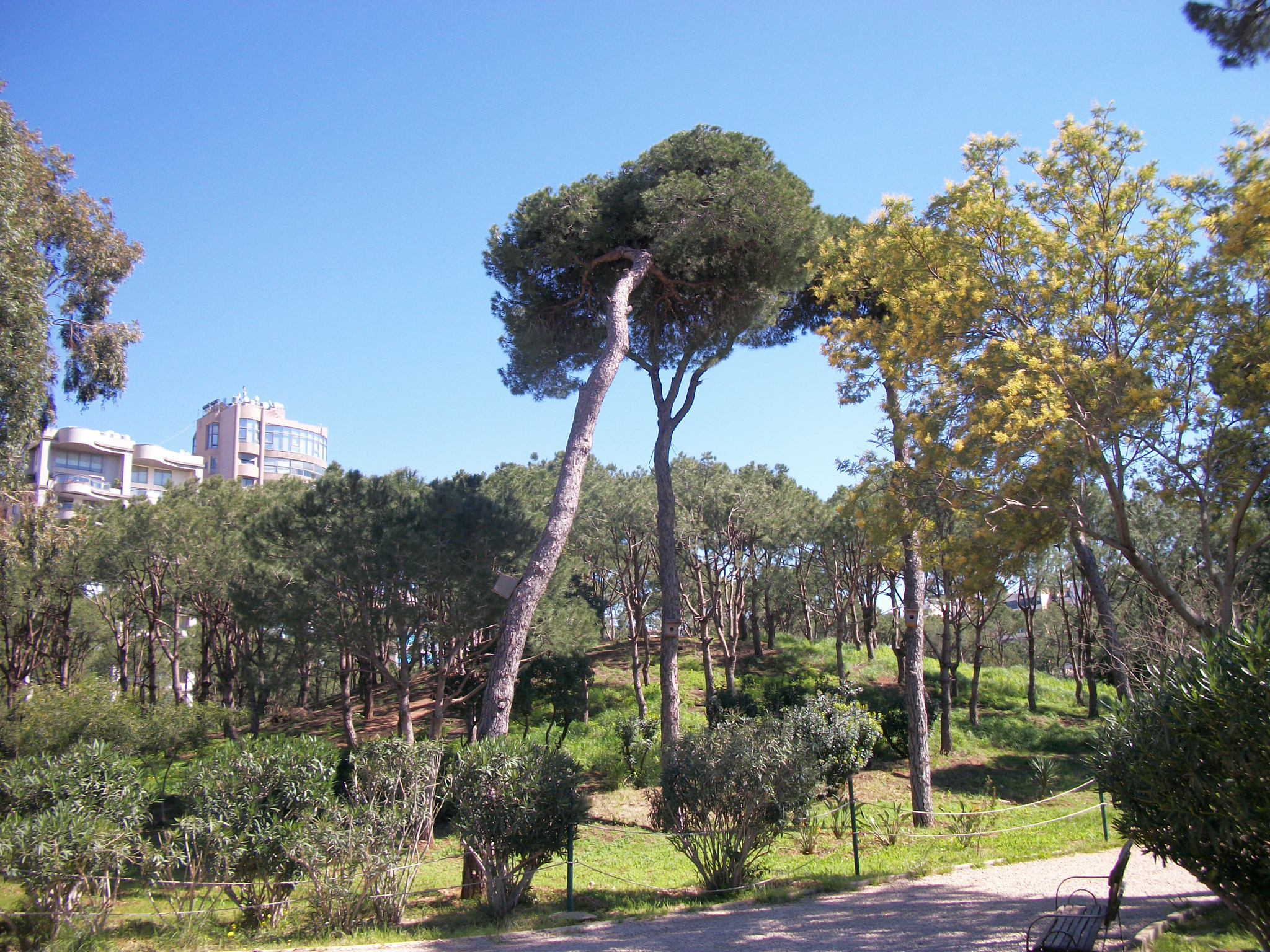
Center of the park

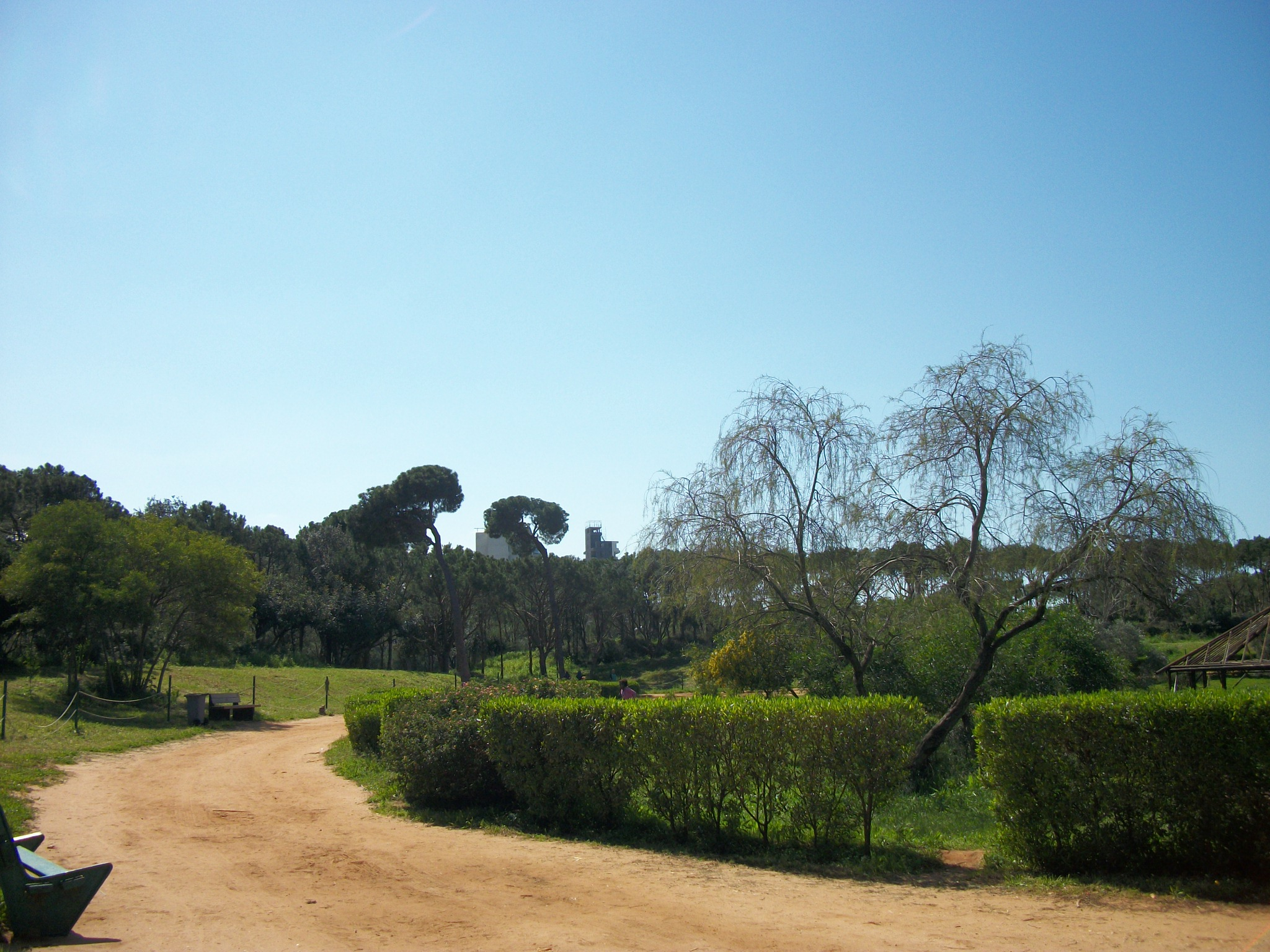
Center of the park

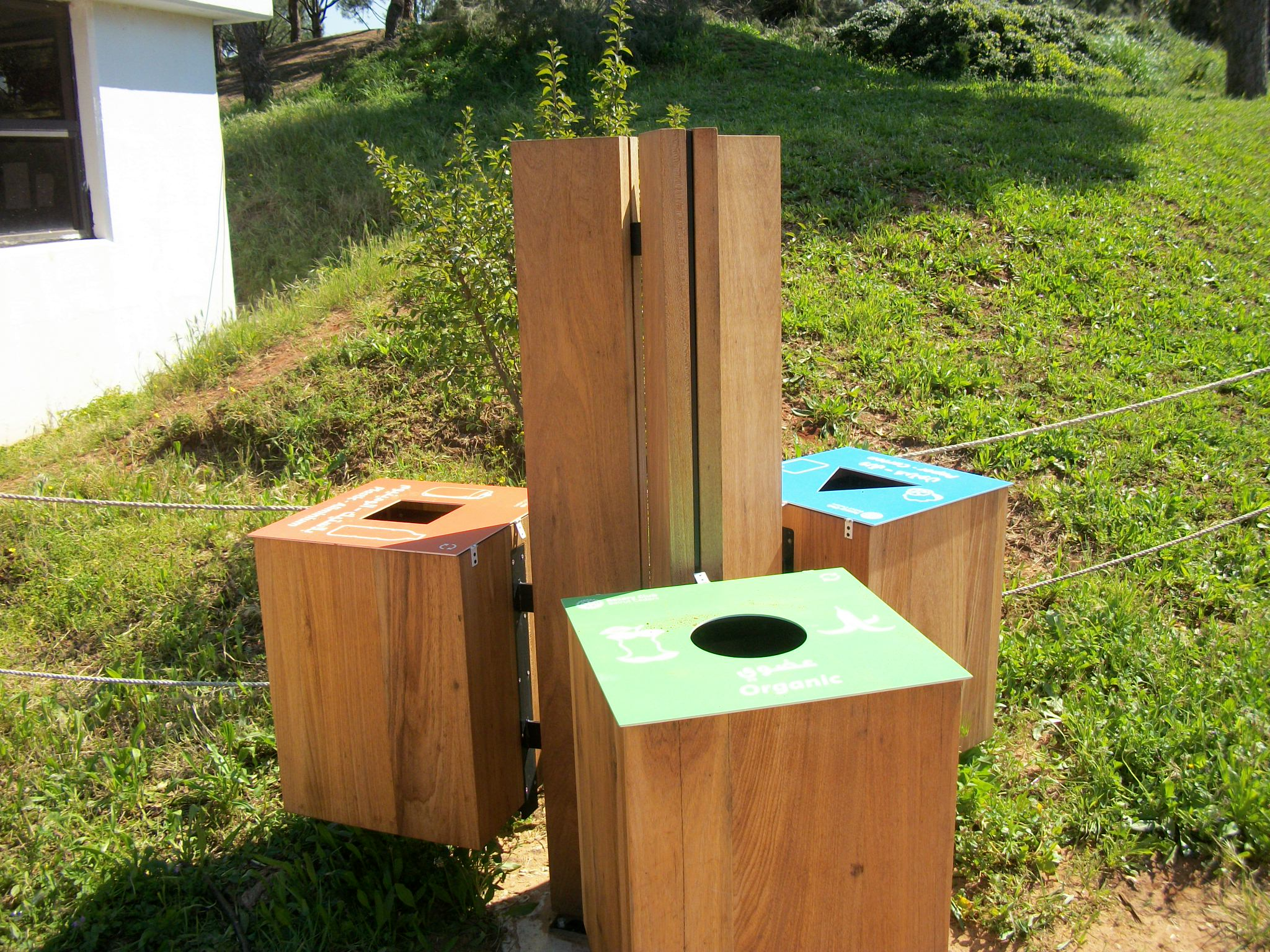
New sorting bin in the center of the park
