= Collège Louise Wegmann =

Louise Wegmann College
- French: Collège Louise Wegmann

Information
- Established: 1965; 61 years ago
- Enrollment: c.1,800
- Language: French

Collège Louise Wegmann, also known as Louise Wegmann College, is a non-denominational school serving students in kindergarten through high school in Lebanon. Established in 1965, the school has around 1800 students. It follows both French and Lebanese baccalaureate programs, offering specializations in mathematics (Sciences générales), biology (Sciences de la vie), economics and social sciences as well as literature and philosophy.

It is a part of the Agency for French Education Abroad (AEFE) network of schools for French children outside of France.

All subjects are taught in French, with language classes in Arabic and English, in addition to Spanish and Italian when required.

== History ==
Collège Louise Wegmann was founded in 1965 by former students of Louise Wegmann, a Lutheran educator and social worker, active in Lebanon in the period of 1920–1950.

== Leadership ==
There have been three Directors of the college since its foundation: Ms. Kattoni (1965-1969), Miss Raymonde Abou (1969-1999) and Mrs Tiba Geha-Villard (2000–present). Ms. Abou has been awarded both the Ordre des Palmes Académiques, an award given to eminent educators who have contributed greatly to the French national education system, as well as the Ordre national du Mérite. Similarly, Mrs. Geha Villard received in December 2008 the Ordre des Palmes Académiques.

== Campus ==
The school had two main campuses, one located in the village of Bchamoun 5 miles from Beirut and a second in Jouret el-Ballout set in a picturesque Mediterranean pine tree forest. In 1999, a third campus opened in Beirut on a plot of four hectares in Badaro that combines students from the campuses in Jouret Al Balout and Bchemoun from 4eme to Terminale. In 2022, the Bchamoun campus closed due to the country's crises.
