= Badaro =

Neighborhood of Beirut

Coordinates: 33°53′N 35°31′E

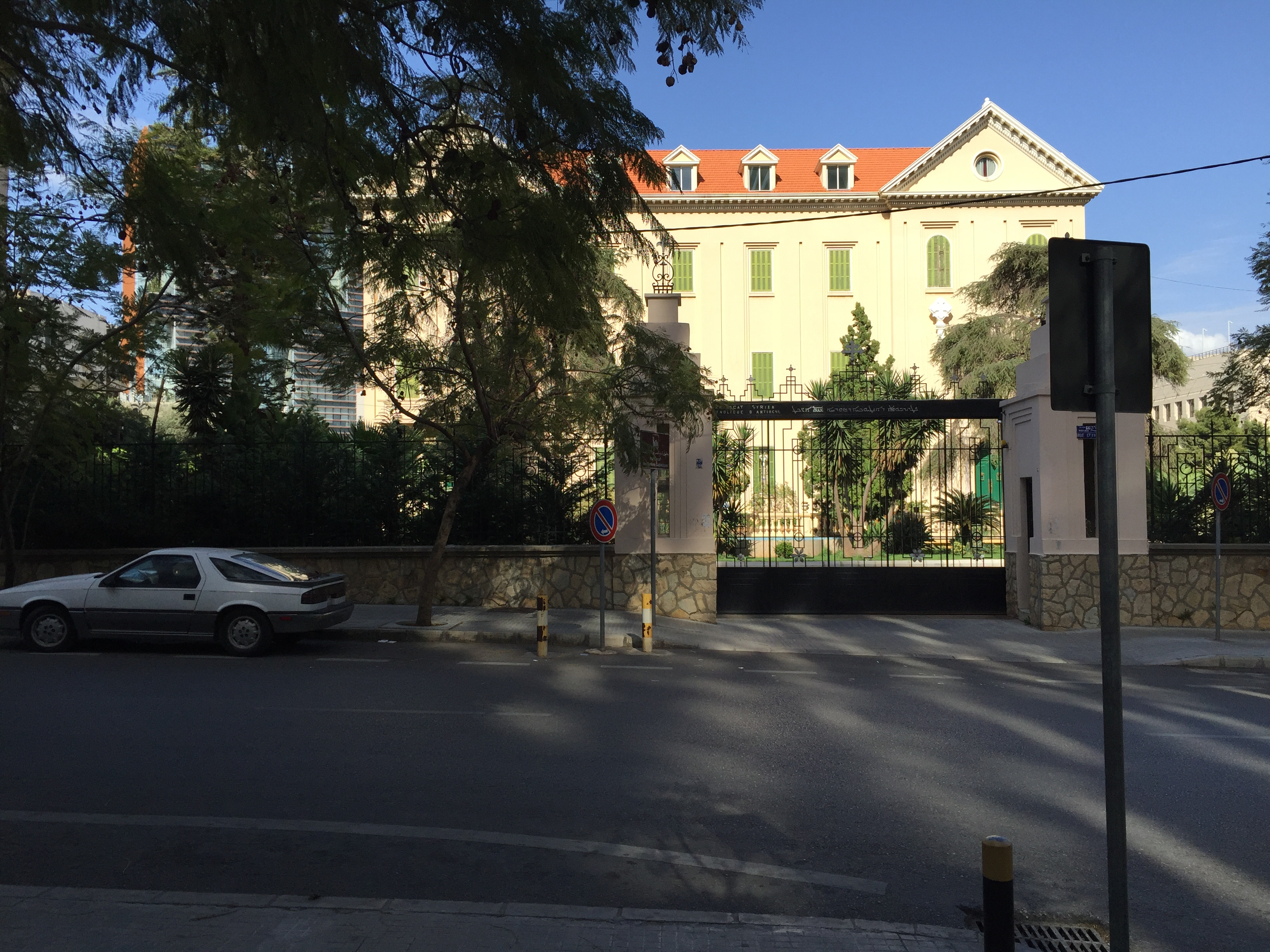
Syriac Catholic Patriarchate, Badaro

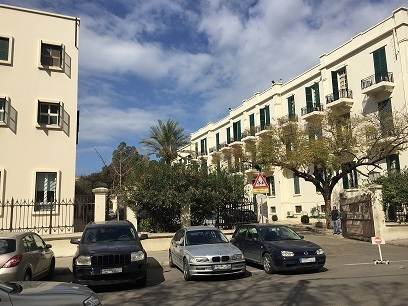
Fransciscaine Convent, Museum street, Badaro

Badaro is a residential neighborhood and business hub in the heart of Beirut, Lebanon. The neighborhood is roughly bounded by the Pierre Gemayel avenue on the north, the Hippodrome on the west, Sami el Solh avenue on the east, Beirut's pine forest on the southeast, and the Tayyouneh roundabout on the south. Badaro is the common name of Beirut's "Horsh" (park) administrative district, which also includes three parks: a75 acres (30 ha) pine forest known as Horsh Beirut, the Beirut Hippodrome and the Pine Residence, the French ambassador's residence.

== Badaro, the "Village" of Beirut ==
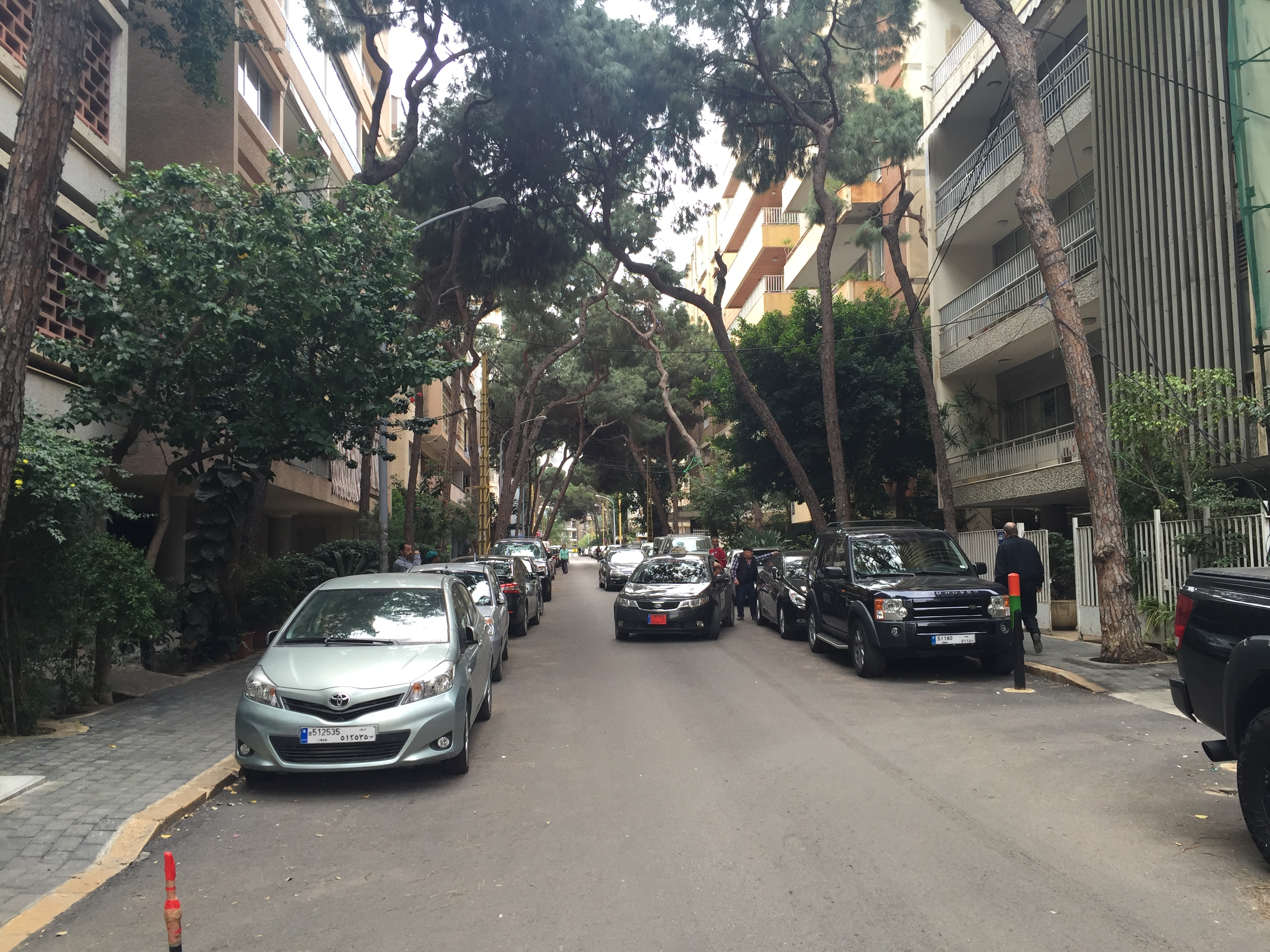
Leafy street, Badaro

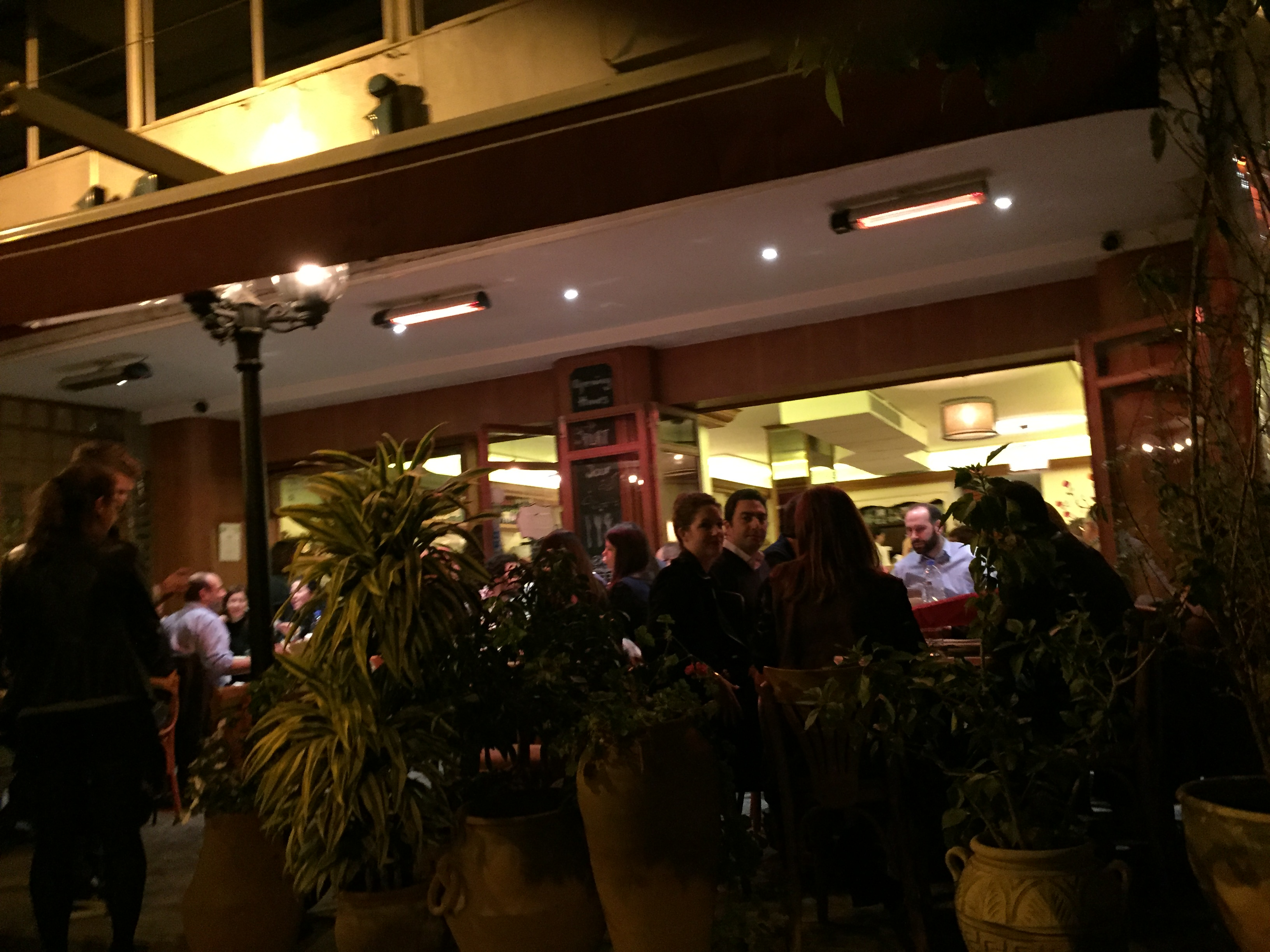
Nightlife scene, Badaro

Badaro is a neighborhood in Beirut. Badaro is within Beirut's green district, next to a 75 acres (30 ha) public park (the Beirut pine forest) and a 50 acres (20 ha) hippodrome. Opposite the museum, the tomb of the unknown soldier, as well as a Roman era colonnade, are part of a small garden with a Byzantine floor mosaic. There are some restaurants in the neighborhood. Badaro is also home to the Smallville Hotel.

The area around the museum square is Beirut's "Little Paris" as it includes most of Beirut's French facilities such as most of the Université Saint Joseph campuses, the French embassy and consulate, the Lycée Français and the Pine Residence, the French ambassador's residence, a 19th-century palace known as "La residence des pins".

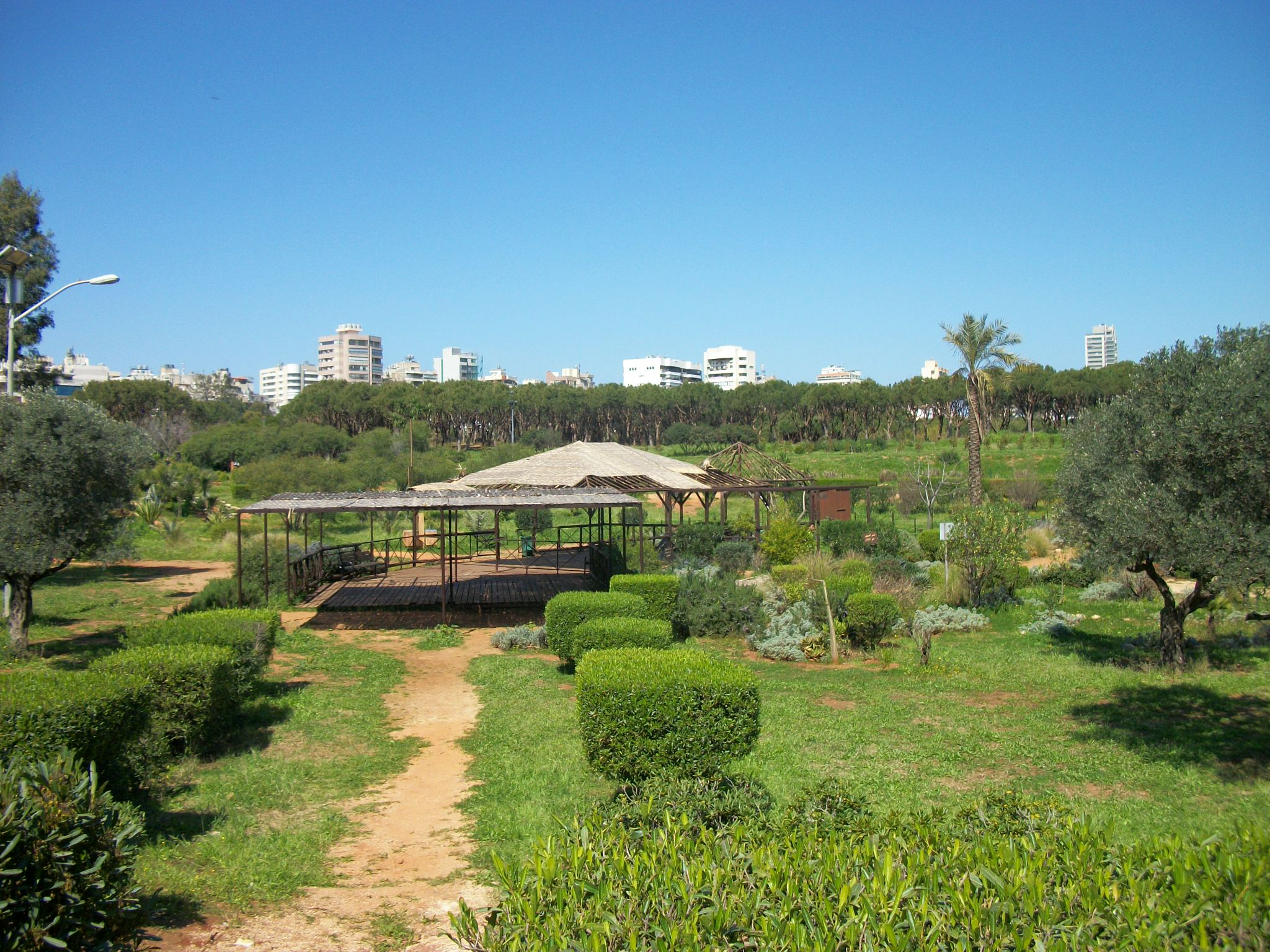
Horsh Beirut – Pine Forest

== History ==
According to a widespread version, in the 17th century, the ruler of the Principality of Lebanon, Emir Fakhreddin, planted pine trees to stop the advance of sand south of the city of Beirut in an area inhabited by Christians and Druze. In fact, much earlier chroniclers report a forest of pine trees stretching from the sea to the northern border of Badaro. In the 13th century, William of Tyre called the forest "La Pinée" or "Sapinoie".

Most of the buildings were built on stilts in a typical low-rise post-modern architectural style. Some of the buildings were designed by mid-century architects, including French designer Jean Royere.

During the Lebanese civil war of 1975–1990, Badaro was a frontline Christian neighborhood, therefore, resulting in the exodus of most of its inhabitants to Europe or safer parts of the country.

Nostalgia of the "dolce vita" style cosmopolitan life in Badaro in the 50s and the 60s is reflected in books of French writer Richard Millet: " The Street of Badaro is an enchanted forest, every step reveals something buried (...)"

== Schools and Churches ==
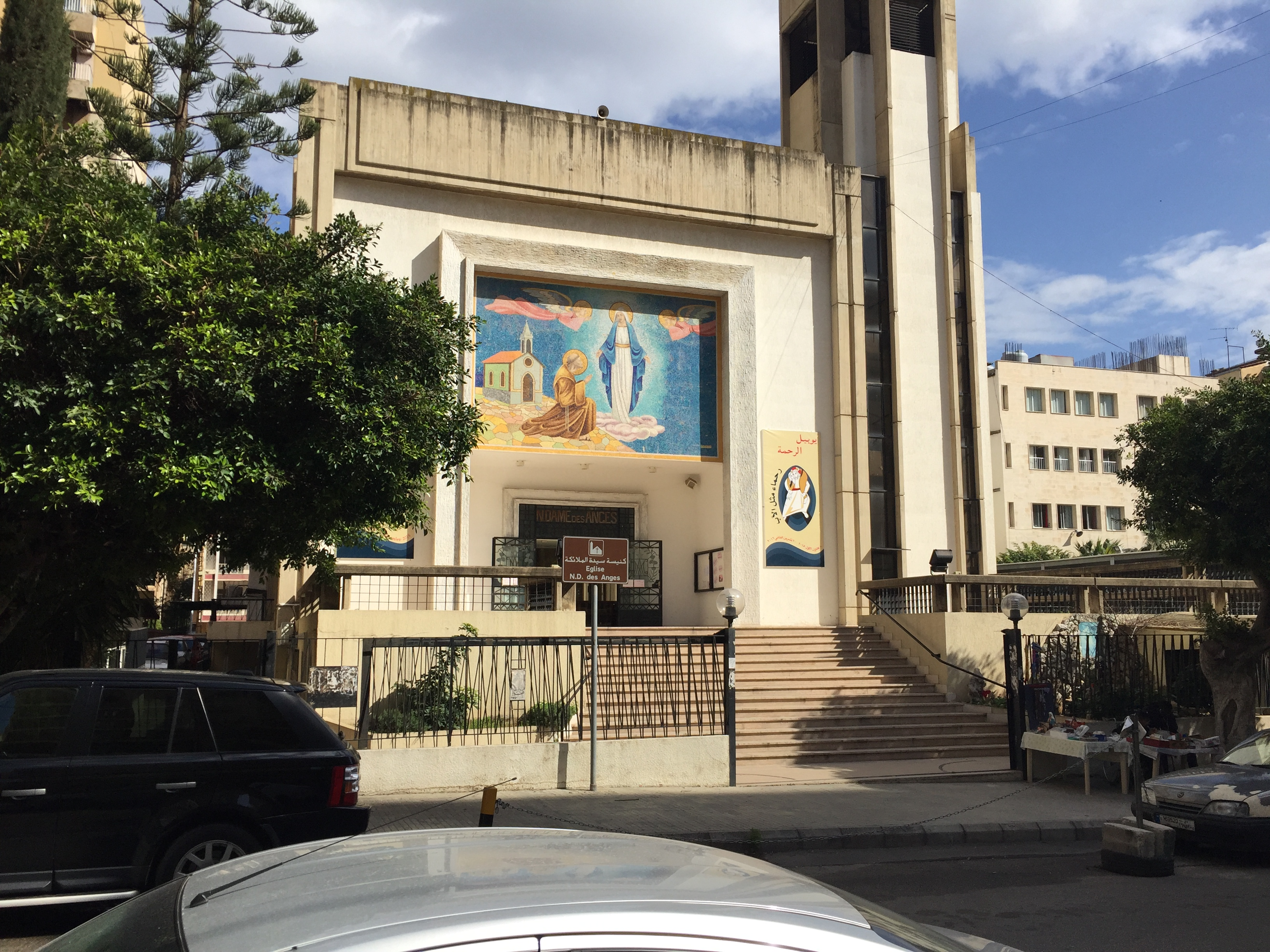
Notre-Dame-Des-Anges, Roman Catholic Church

The greater Badaro area is home to schools and churches from different denominations. On Damascus street, facing the Smallville hotel lies the Syriac Catholic patriarchate, a palace surrounded by a garden. Further on the same street, across the Museum of Beirut crossing and next to the French embassy, one can see the Beirut's Greek Catholic Bishop's palace, which was fully destroyed during the 1975-1990 civil war and rebuilt with the same limestone architectural style. The Sacred Heart of Jesus Maronite church is a modern construction located northwest of Sami el Solh avenue, while another Maronite church, Notre Dame of Lourdes, is located across Sami el Solh, on the south east side and is mostly attended by worshippers from the neighboring Ain el Remmaneh Christian suburb.

On Badaro street, the Notre Dame des Anges Roman Catholic church has a mosaic façade and is a reminiscence of the pre-civil war Lebanon, when Badaro was the preferred neighborhood of the many French nationals settled in Lebanon. Across Badaro street, one of the few Protestant churches in the country is attended mostly by the very small Lebanese Protestant community. The Sunday mass of the Franciscan convent adjacent to the Hippodrome is attended by Ethiopian domestic women workers.

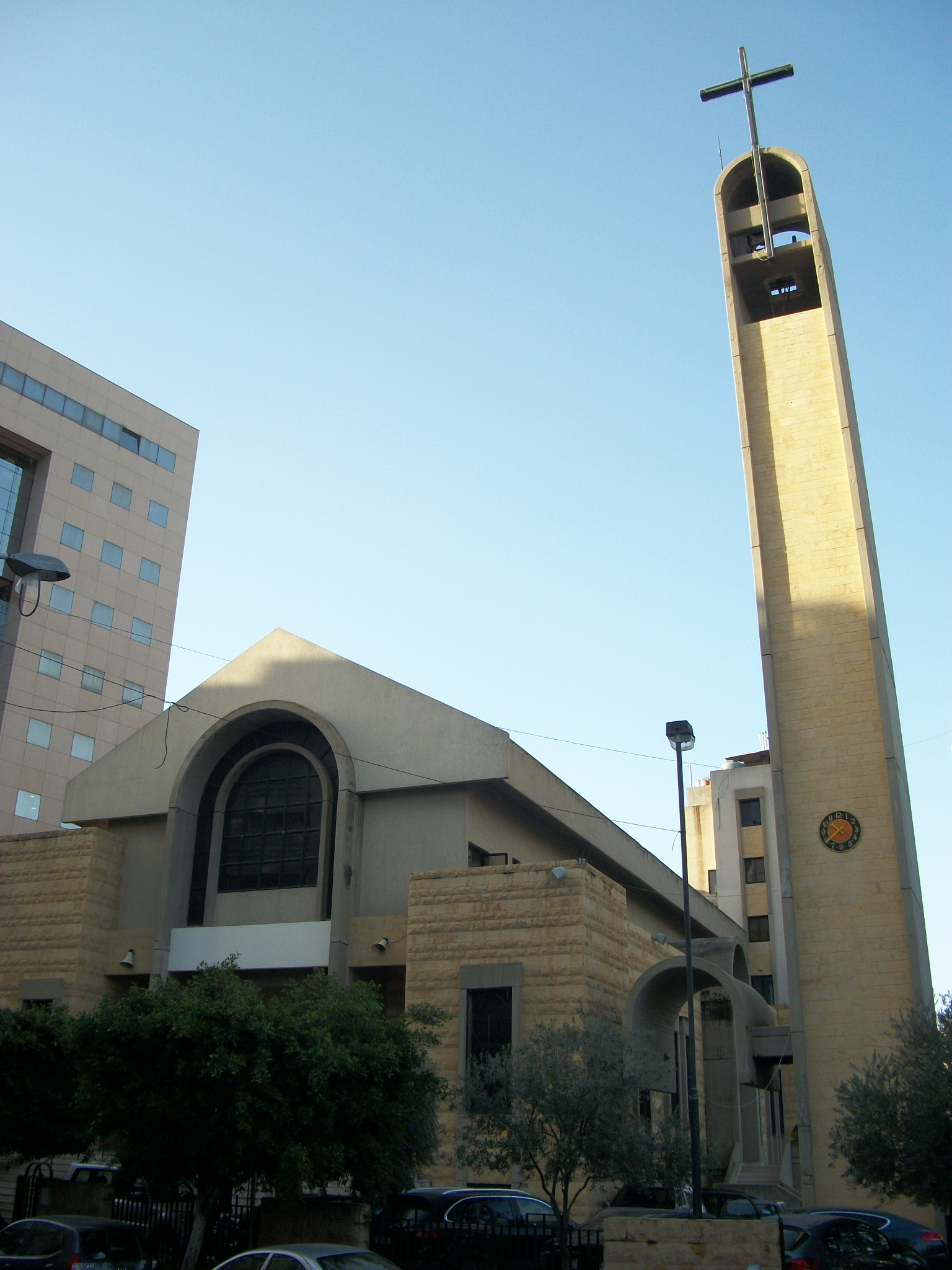
Église du Sacré-Cœur, Badaro

The street adjacent to the Hippodrome is home to four schools: College Louise Wegman un upscale secular secondary school, College Saint Sauveur which is associated with the Jesuit Jamhour college, the Syrian Catholic Lycée du Musée and the Franciscan school. Across Sami el Solh, the semi tubular Notre Dame church of "College des Frères de la Salle" dominates the Avenue.

== Economy ==
Main attractions of Badaro are its two museums: the National Museum of Beirut and the Mineral Museum (MIM). Jogging or walking in the 75 acres pine forest also known as Horsh Beirut is also a must. Many corporate headquarters are located on Sami el Solh Avenue and, on the section of Pierre Gemayel avenue bordering the Badaro area, many high rise office towers were built after 2006, with some of the towers serving as headquarters to banks. Moreover, Badaro is home to the Ministry of Justice, the Beirut Courts and the majority of the country's law firms.

At the Southwest end of Badaro, the military hospital sector is an enclave. It regroups barracks, a hospital, pharmacies, shops and cooperatives, dedicated to members of the military and the police and their families.

== Image gallery ==
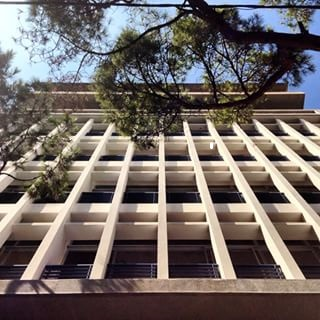
Jean Royère Building, Badaro

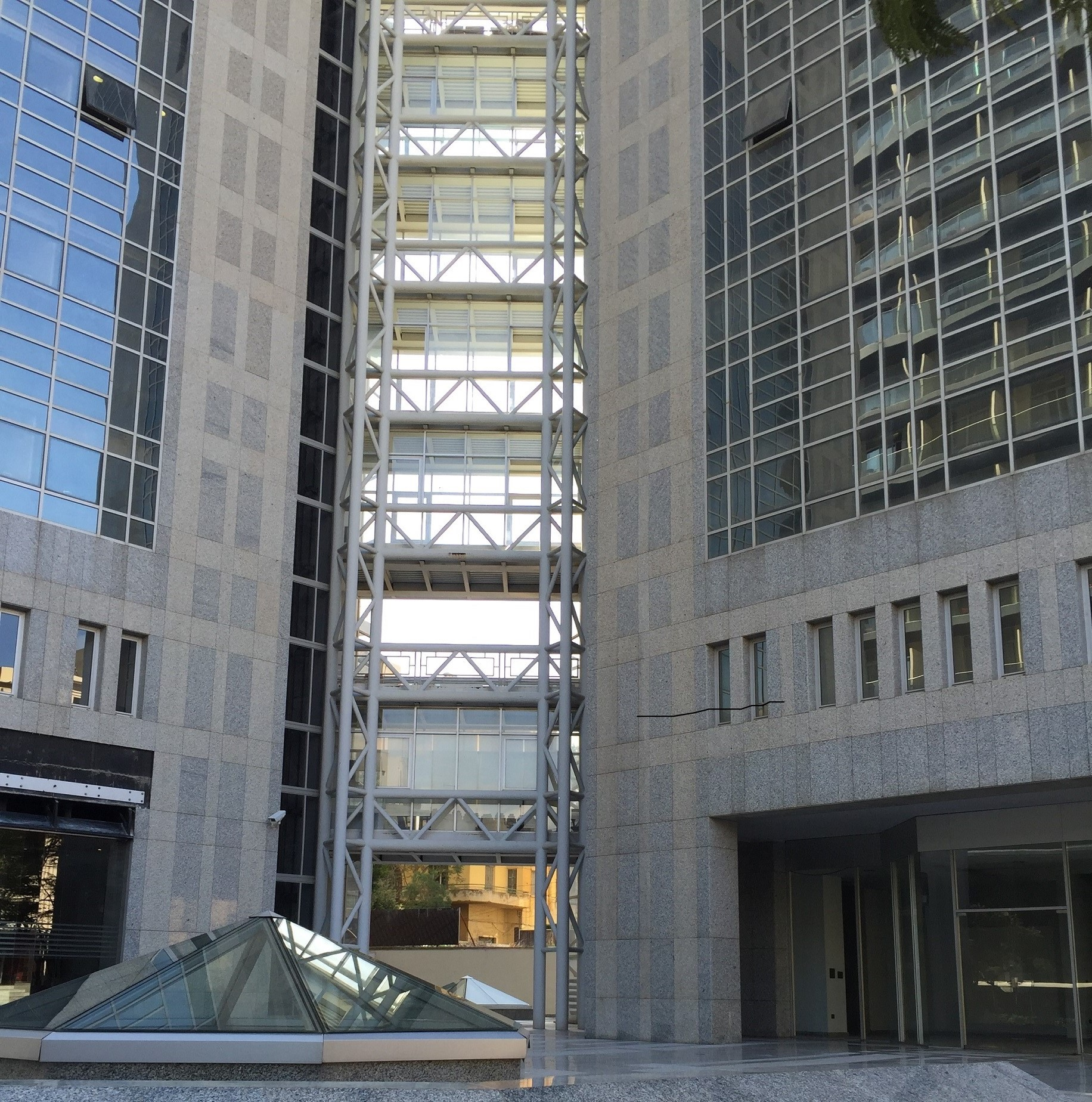
Corporate Headquarters, Badaro

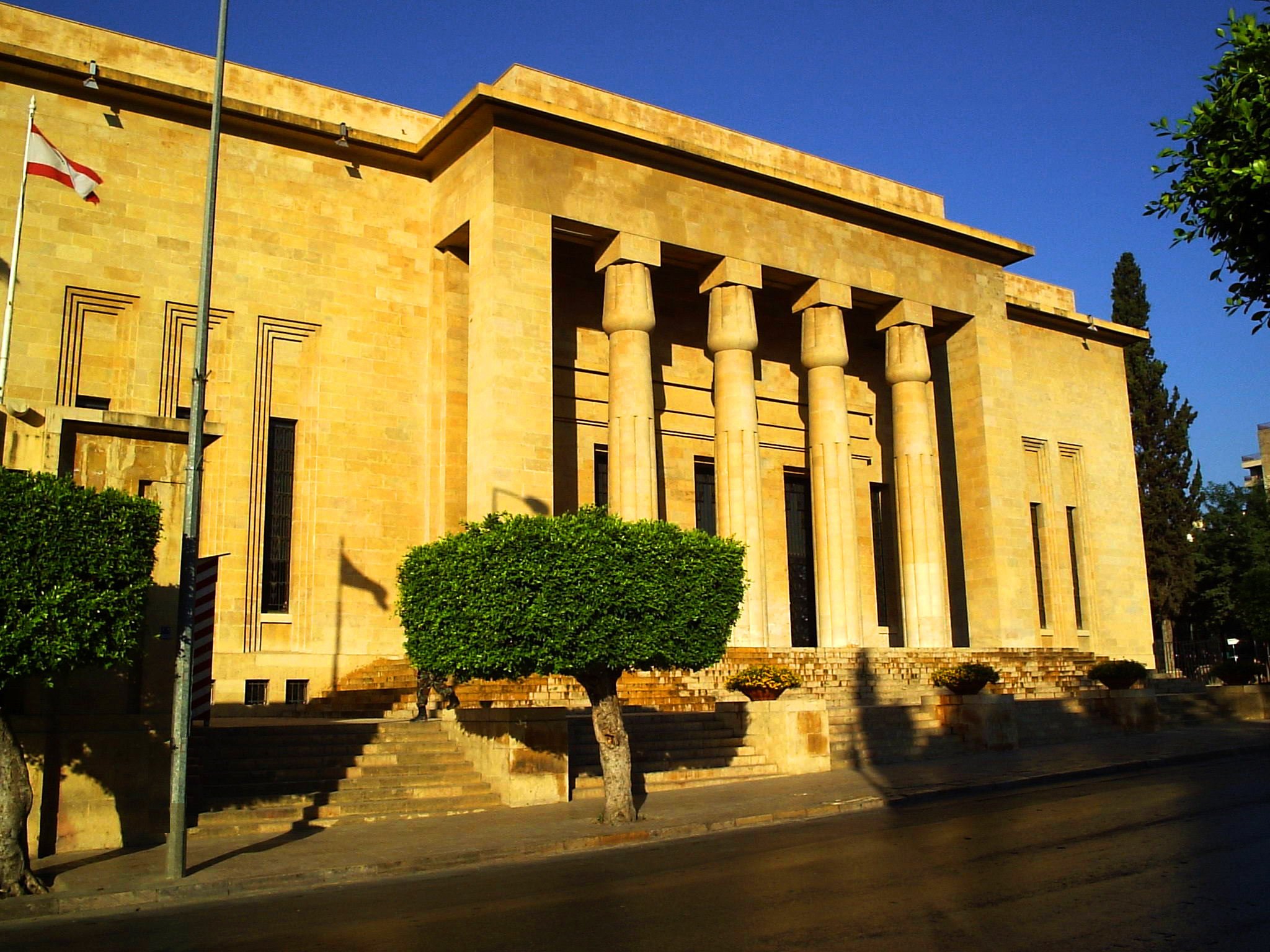
Beirut National Museum, Badaro

== See also ==
- Beirut
- National Museum of Beirut
- Horsh Beirut
