= Beirut International Exhibition & Leisure Center =

Exhibition center in Beirut, Lebanon

Coordinates: 33°54′17.82″N 35°30′35.83″E

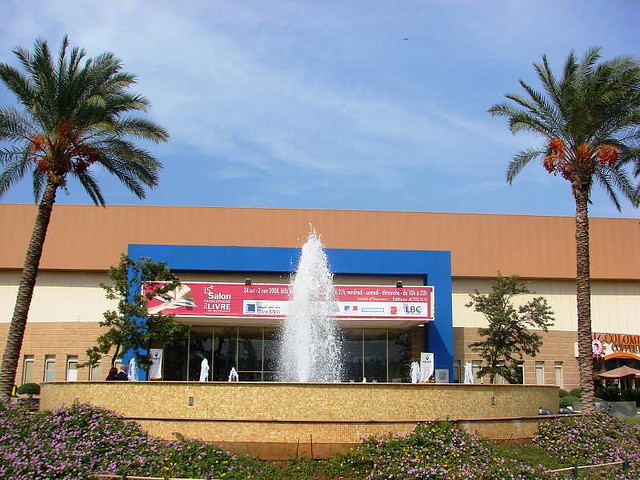

The Beirut International Exhibition & Leisure Center (commonly BIEL) is a multi-purpose facility, hosting exhibitions (Beirut Book Fair), conferences, concerts and private events. It opened on 28 November 2001. It moved from what is now called the Arena Waterfront to its current location on Emile Lahoud highway in 2018.

== Notable performances ==
American pop-R&B diva Mariah Carey gave a Beirut concert during her Charmbracelet World Tour on 24 February 2004 at the BIEL. British singer-songwriter Phil Collins took part in a charity concert for children’s cancer at the BIEL in 2005. On 10 June 2006, American rappers 50 Cent and G-Unit performed their first concert in the Arab world at the BIEL. On 23 July 2014, English singer-songwriter Ellie Goulding performed in the BIEL as part of her The Halcyon Days Tour. British Pink Floyd tribute band Brit Floyd performed at the venue in December 2015.

== Record ==
Shakira holds the record for the most attended concert in Lebanon with around 32,000 people.

== See also ==
- Beirut Central District
- Beirut Nights
- Beirut
