= Taichung Jazz Festival =

Annual music festival in West, Taichung, Taiwan

Taichung Jazz Festival 臺中爵士音樂節
- Photographed in 2026
- Genre: jazz
- Locations: Civic Square and Calligraphy Greenway, West, Taichung, Taiwan
- Years active: 2003-present
- Founders: Taichung City Hall
- Website: Official website

The Taichung Jazz Festival (traditional Chinese: 臺中爵士音樂節; simplified Chinese: 台中爵士音乐节; pinyin: Táizhōng Juéshì Yīnyuè Jié) is an annual jazz music festival held in West District, Taichung, Taiwan. As the biggest jazz festival in Taiwan, it becomes a tourist attraction of the city which draws millions to visit every year. The main stage is typically located at Civic Square, a park within Calligraphy Greenway.

== History ==
The festival started in 2003 and is held annually in October. With an initial 30,000 to 40,000 people during its first year, the festival's audience has grown to over 1 million visiters annually. In September 2020, the event organizer had to cancel the festival for the year due to the ongoing COVID-19 pandemic.

== See also ==
- Music of Taiwan
- List of music festivals in Taiwan
