= Taichung City Dadun Cultural Center =

Cultural center in West, Taichung, Taiwan

- 臺中市大墩文化中心
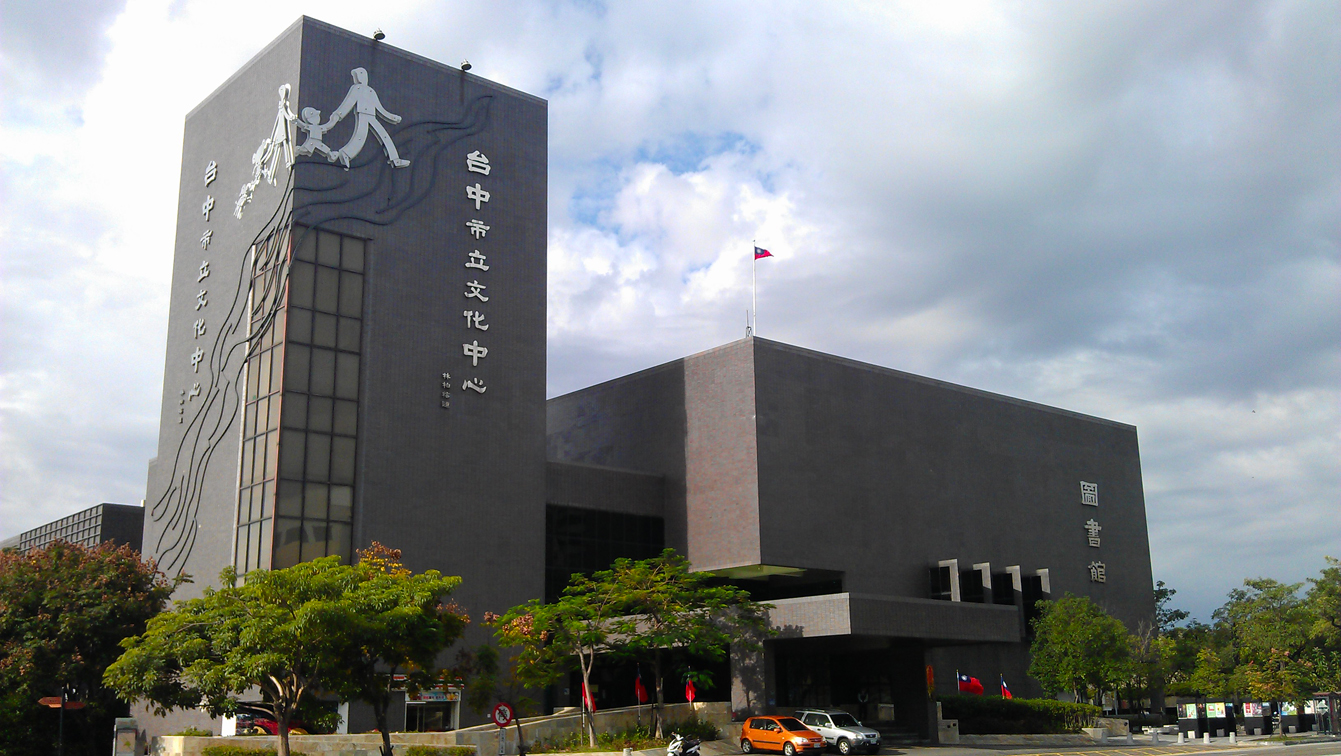
- Interactive map of the Taichung City Dadun Cultural Center area

General information
- Type: cultural center
- Location: West, Taichung, Taiwan
- Coordinates: 24°08′28″N 120°39′56″E
- Owner: Taichung City Government

Technical details
- Floor count: 5

Website
- Official website

The Taichung City Dadun Cultural Center (also Da Dun Cultural Center, traditional Chinese: 臺中市大墩文化中心; simplified Chinese: 台中市大墩文化中心; pinyin: Táizhōng Shìlì Dàdūn Wénhuà Zhōngxīn) is a cultural center in West District, Taichung, Taiwan.

== Organizational structure ==
The organization of the center has the following structure:

- Promotion section
- Exhibition and performance
- Section
- Library section
- General affairs section
- Personnel clerk
- Accountant

== Architecture ==
The building is a five-story building. It consists of Da Dun gallery, exhibition rooms, document room, periodical room, children's room, reading room, open stack library, reference room, auditorium, conference room, training classroom, dance studio and music classroom.

== See also ==
- List of museums in Taiwan
