= Lu Fo-ting =

Taiwanese ink painter and calligrapher (1911–2005)

Lu Foting (Chinese: 呂佛庭, November 29, 1911 – July 24, 2005) was born in Biyang County, Henan Province. His original name was Lu Tianci, also known by the courtesy names Futing and Fotin, as well as the pseudonyms Banseng and Yuweng. He adopted the Dharma name Puxian. Lu Fo-ting was a renowned Taiwanese ink painter and calligrapher, particularly recognized for his landscape paintings.

In 1948, he relocated to Taiwan and held a long-term position at Taichung Normal University (now National Taichung University of Education). His notable works include "Ten Thousand Miles of the Great Wall," "Ten Thousand Miles of the Yangtze River," "Cross-Island Highway," and "Ten Thousand Miles of the Yellow River."

Due to his significant contributions to the field of painting and art education, he was honored with the National Literary and Art Award for Special Contributions in 1988. Subsequently, he received the Executive Yuan Cultural Award in 1993 for his achievements.

== Life ==
Early Years in Mainland China

Lu Fo-ting began his artistic journey by studying calligraphy and poetry under the guidance of his father since childhood. He also learned foundational ink painting techniques through the emulation of the "Jieziyuan Huapu" (Manual of the Mustard Seed Garden), and later sought further instruction from the flower-and-bird painter Lu Shixun. In 1925, Lu attended a Christian high school, where he gained basic knowledge of Western painting. In 1927, he enrolled in the Biyang County Rural Normal School, where he studied figure and lady paintings under the painter Jiao Junfeng. After graduating from the Rural Normal School in 1929, he passed the entrance examination for the Beijing School of Art, where he received instruction from renowned artists such as Qi Baishi, Qin Zhongwen, and Wang Xuetao. Lu Fo-ting graduated from the Beijing School of Art in 1934. In 1935, he embarked on a two-year journey, exploring landscapes and scenic spots in Henan, Nanjing, Suzhou, Shanghai, and other places. In 1939, he briefly served as a secretary in the Civil Affairs Department of the Henan Provincial Government. However, he resigned due to his discomfort with bureaucratic life and the approaching Sino-Japanese conflict. He then began a journey of refuge and exploration, sketching along the way. In 1945, he held exhibitions of his artworks in Kaifeng, Wuhan, Xi'an, and other cities.

Years in Taiwan

In 1948, Lu Fo-ting crossed the Straight to Taiwan. In August of that year, he accepted a teaching position at Taitung Teachers College (now National Taitung University) while also exploring the landscapes of eastern Taiwan and sketching scenes. The following year (1949), he resigned from his teaching position and attempted to become a monk at Yuanguang Temple on Lion's Head Mountain in Hsinchu, but was unsuccessful. In August of the same year, he joined National Taichung Teachers College (now National Taichung University of Education) and remained there until his retirement in 1973. During his career, he also taught at institutions such as National Taiwan Normal University, National Taiwan Academy of Arts (now National Taiwan University of Arts), and Chinese Culture University. In 1954, he established the "Central Taiwan Art Association" and organized the Central Taiwan Art Exhibition. In 1962, he co-founded the "Chinese Painting Society" with artists Ma Shouhua, Yao Menggu, and Fu Juanfu. In 1976, he established the "National Style Calligraphy and Painting Association," dedicating his life to promoting art education and innovation.

Lu Fo-ting's artistic focus was on landscape painting. During the 1960s, he completed three lengthy scroll paintings: "Ten Thousand Miles of the Great Wall" (1963), "Ten Thousand Miles of the Yangtze River" (1965), and "Cross-Island Highway" (1969). He also completed his fourth monumental landscape scroll, "Ten Thousand Miles of the Yellow River," in 1985. In addition to landscape painting, in the early 1970s, Lu Fo-ting started to moisten the painting surface with water, then used dense ink or colored pigments to create a "Zen-inspired painting" characterized by ink and color blending in a free-flowing and ethereal manner.

Alongside this development, he began to incorporate pictographic characters from oracle bone script, seal script, brick inscriptions, and mirror engravings into his paintings, creating "calligraphy paintings" that represented an innovative experiment in the realm of art.

Beyond painting and calligraphy, Lu Fo-ting delved into poetry, playing the zither, and Zen studies. He also extensively researched the history of painting and calligraphy, as well as painting theories. He authored more than ten works, including "Origins of Chinese Calligraphy and Painting," "Evaluations and Biographies of Chinese Painting History," "Chinese Painting Thought," "Studies in Calligraphy Painting," and "Collection of Poems from the Myriad Miles Tower."
