= Taichung Prefectural Hall =

Former government building in West, Taichung, Taiwan

- 臺中州廳
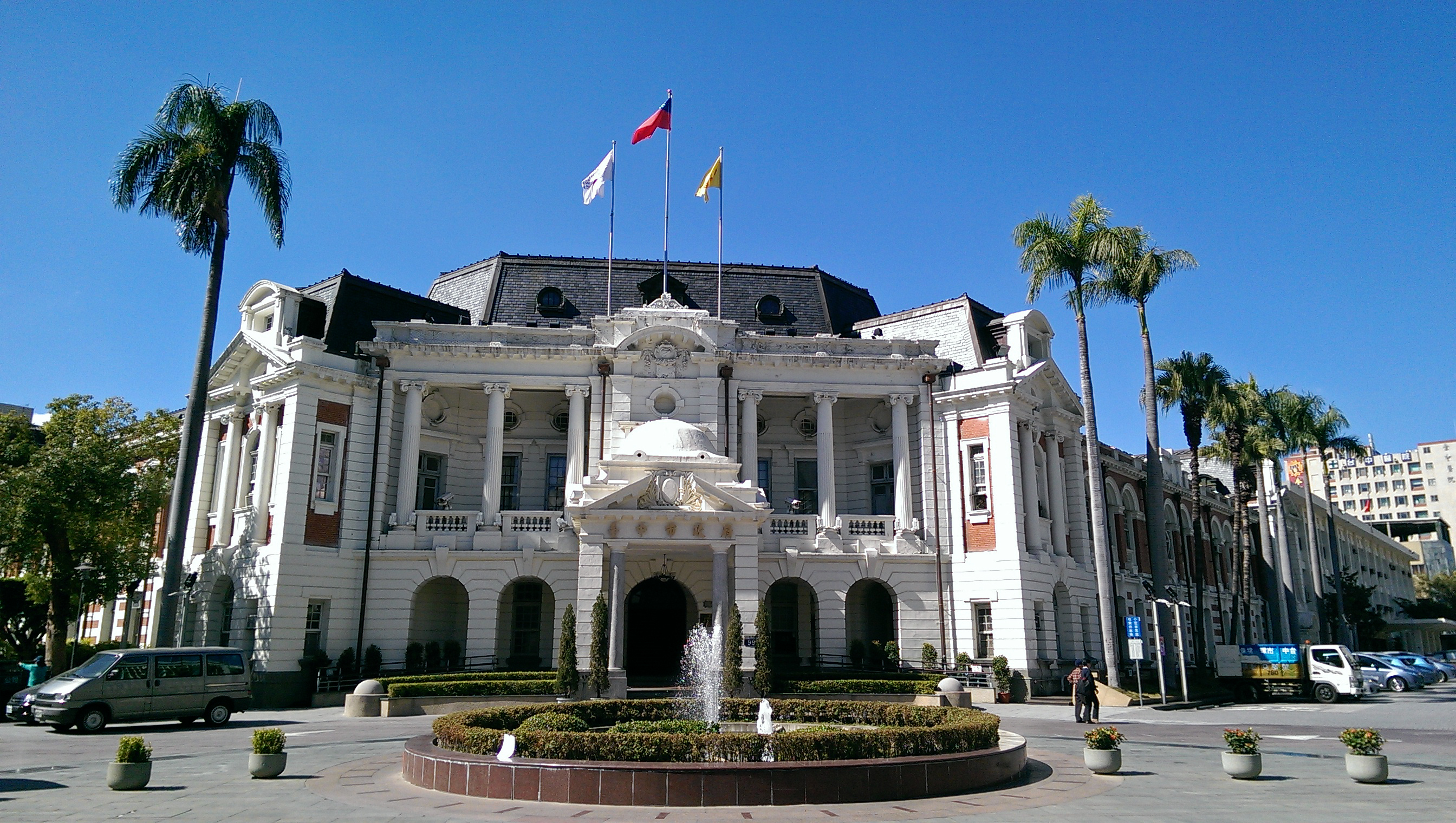
- Interactive map of Taichung Prefectural Hall
- Former names: Taichu Prefectural Hall
- Location: West District, Taichung, Taiwan
- Coordinates: 24°8′19″N 120°40′42.3″E
- Type: former government building
- Public transit: Taichung Station

Construction
- Built: 1913
- Renovated: 2018
- Cost: NT$1.05 billion
- Architect: Moriyama Matsunosuke

The Taichū Prefectural Hall (traditional Chinese: 臺中州廳; simplified Chinese: 台中州厅; pinyin: Táizhōng Zhōu Tīng) is a former government building in West District, Taichung, Taiwan.

== History ==
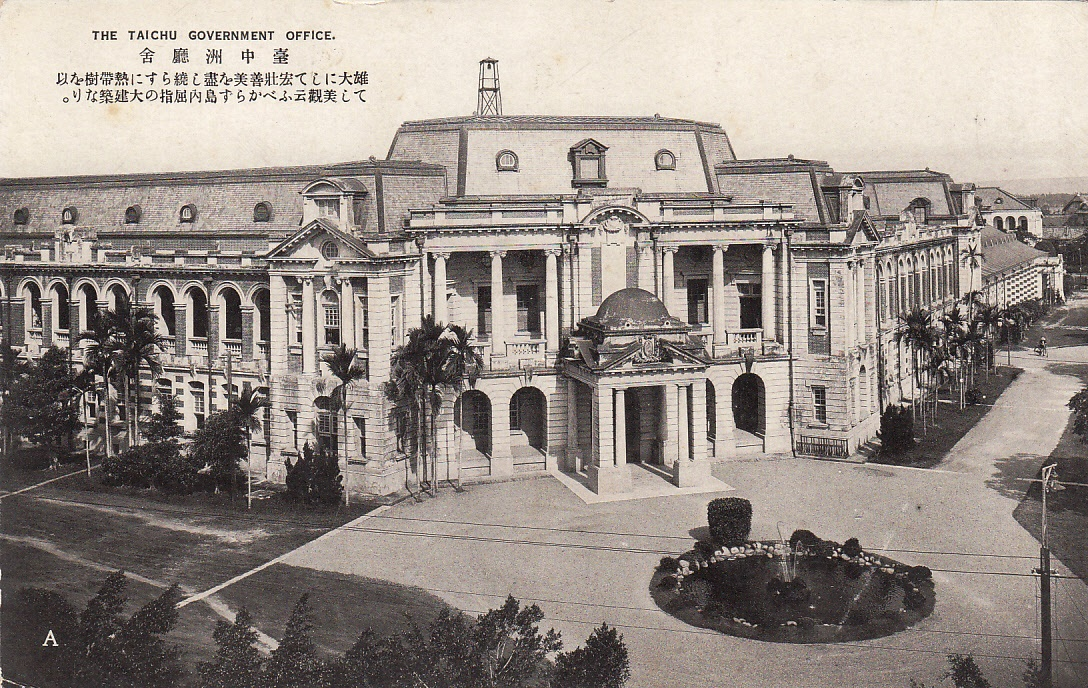
Taichu Prefectural Hall during the Japanese rule of Taiwan

The building was originally constructed in 1913 during the Japanese rule of Taiwan as the Taichu Prefectural Hall (Chinese: 臺中州廳) which housed the city hall of Taichū Prefecture. The last of four expansions was completed in 1934. It was then used as the office of Environmental Protection Bureau of Taichung City Government. The building was designated as a historic building in 2002 and as a city-designated historic building in 2006. In November 2017, the Bureau of Cultural Affairs requested the city government to assign the national heritage status to the former city hall. The application for national heritage status was formally submitted by the Taichung City Government in April 2018. The Taichung Prefectural Hall was officially designated a national historic monument in January 2019.

In 2018, it was decided to transform the building into the Taichung Prefectural Hall Park which was expected to be completed by 2021. The project was part of the efforts to revitalize the historic district of Taichung by the Ministry of Culture. The project was estimated to cost NT$1.05 billion and an additional budget of NT$1.2 billion was set for the establishment of an archive for local art history and photography development. Developmental oversight of the center was led by National Taiwan Museum of Fine Arts. Lu Shiow-yen announced in February 2020 that her mayoral administration was withdrawing from the agreement with NTMoFA, and that Taichung Prefectural Hall would not become a second exhibition hall for the museum.

== Architecture ==
The building of the art center was constructed with Baroque architectural style with mansard roof. It was designed by Japanese architect Matsunosuke Moriyama. It has a street corner style configuration with the main entrance at the corner. The two sides of the building extended like wings.

== Events ==
The building has been part of the annual Taichung Light Festival, organized by the Cultural Affairs Bureau of the city government. It also used to house other events, such as seminars.

== Transportation ==
The Taichung Prefectural Hall is accessible within walking distance west of Taichung Station of Taiwan Railway.

== See also ==
- List of tourist attractions in Taiwan
