= Liming New Village =

Planned community in Taichung, Taiwan

Liming New Village 黎明新村
- Planned community
- Interactive map of Liming New Village
- Coordinates: 24.1537°N 120.6318°E
- Country: Taiwan
- City: Taichung
- District: Nantun District

Area
  - Land: 41 ha (100 acres)

Population (2019) (Note: Population of Liming Village (黎明里))
  - Total: 5,006

Liming New Village (Chinese: 黎明新村; pinyin: Límíng Xīncūn) is a planned community located in Nantun District, Taichung City, Taiwan. The community's boundaries roughly corresponds to those of Liming Village.

== History ==
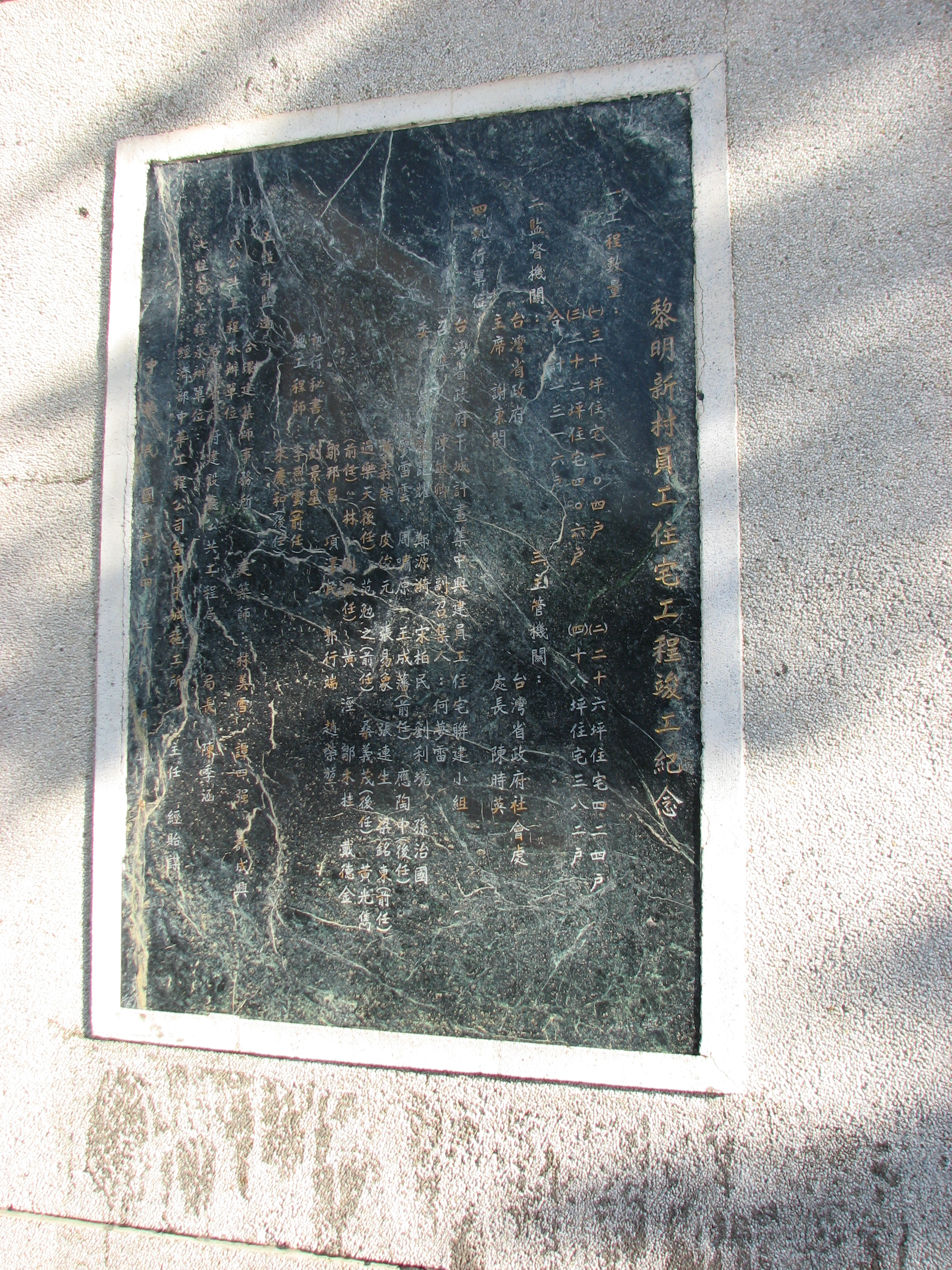
A stone plaque dating from 1975 that commemorates the completion of the village's residential buildings.

Originally, Taipei was simultaneously the capital of the Republic of China and Taiwan Province, which was deemed a security risk in the case of an invasion by the Communist government in mainland China. Therefore, it was decided that the provincial government would move to central Taiwan, and government employees would live in new planned communities inspired by the garden city movement. The first two communities built were Guangfu New Village and Zhongxing New Village.

In 1972, some government agencies were temporarily relocated from Taipei to Gancheng military base near Taichung railway station while they searched for another tract of land to develop. Sancuo Farm (三厝農場), an empty piece of farmland, was chosen as the site of the new community. The first agencies to move in were the Water Resources Agency, the Land Administration Agency, and the Environmental Protection Agency, and other branches moved in over the next decade. Meanwhile, low-density residential buildings for public servants were constructed to house roughly one thousand families, complete with parks and other green space. There was also some small-scale agriculture along a small creek to the west of the community.

Due to Taichung's urban growth, there have been multiple calls to demolish Liming New Village and redevelop it in a manner similar to the adjacent 7th Redevelopment Zone, the city's new central business district.

== Gallery ==
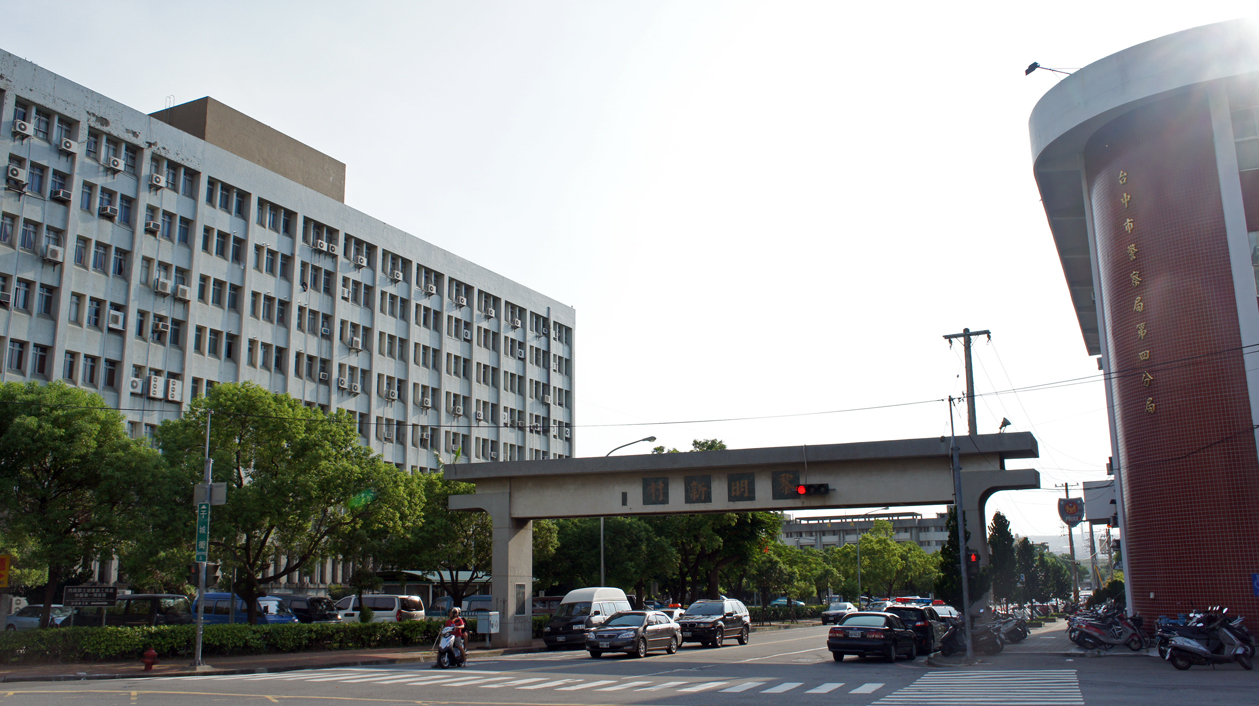
One of the entrances to the village. Left: Office building for the Ministry of the Interior. Right: A police station.

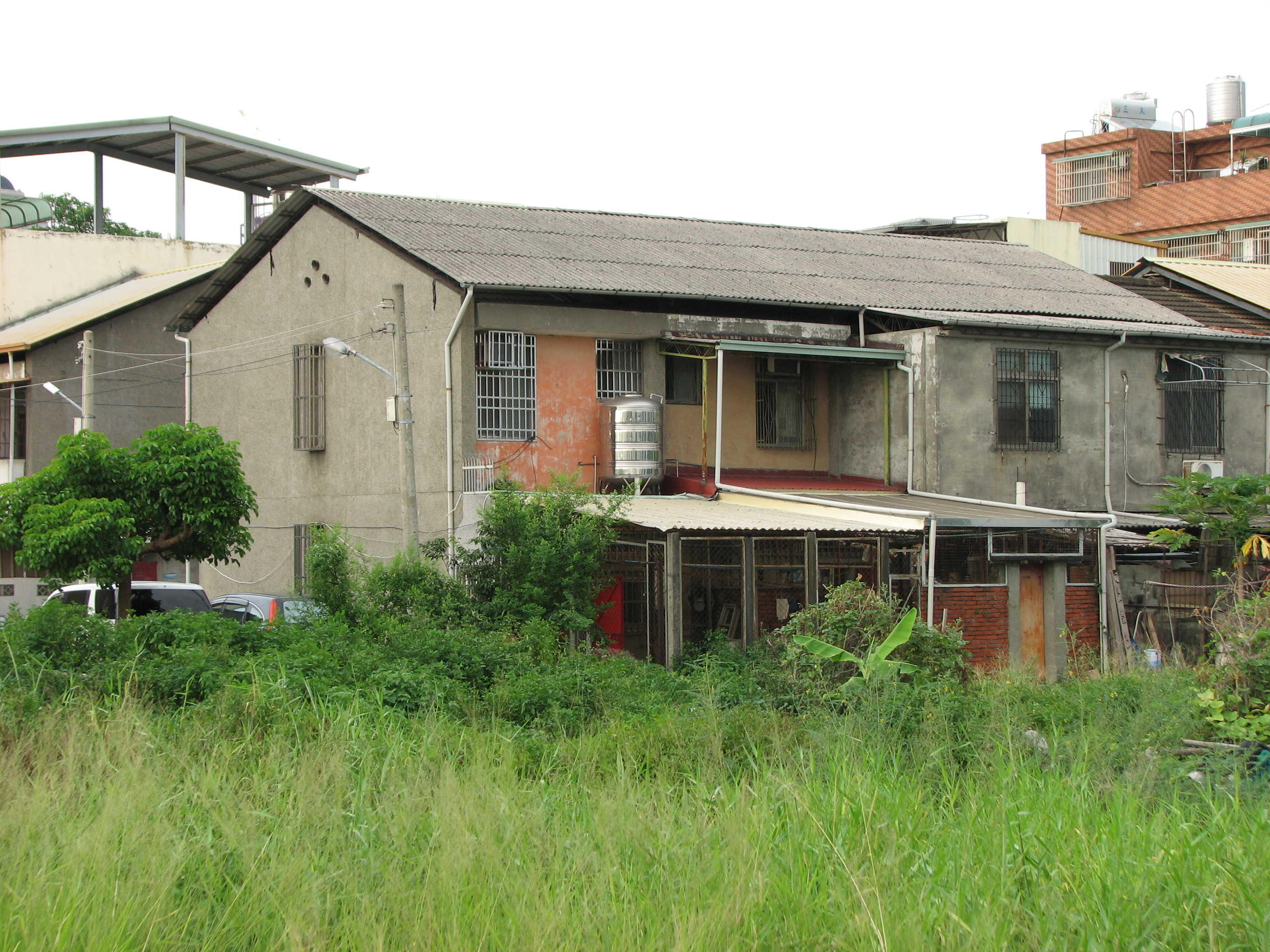
One of the original residences in the community

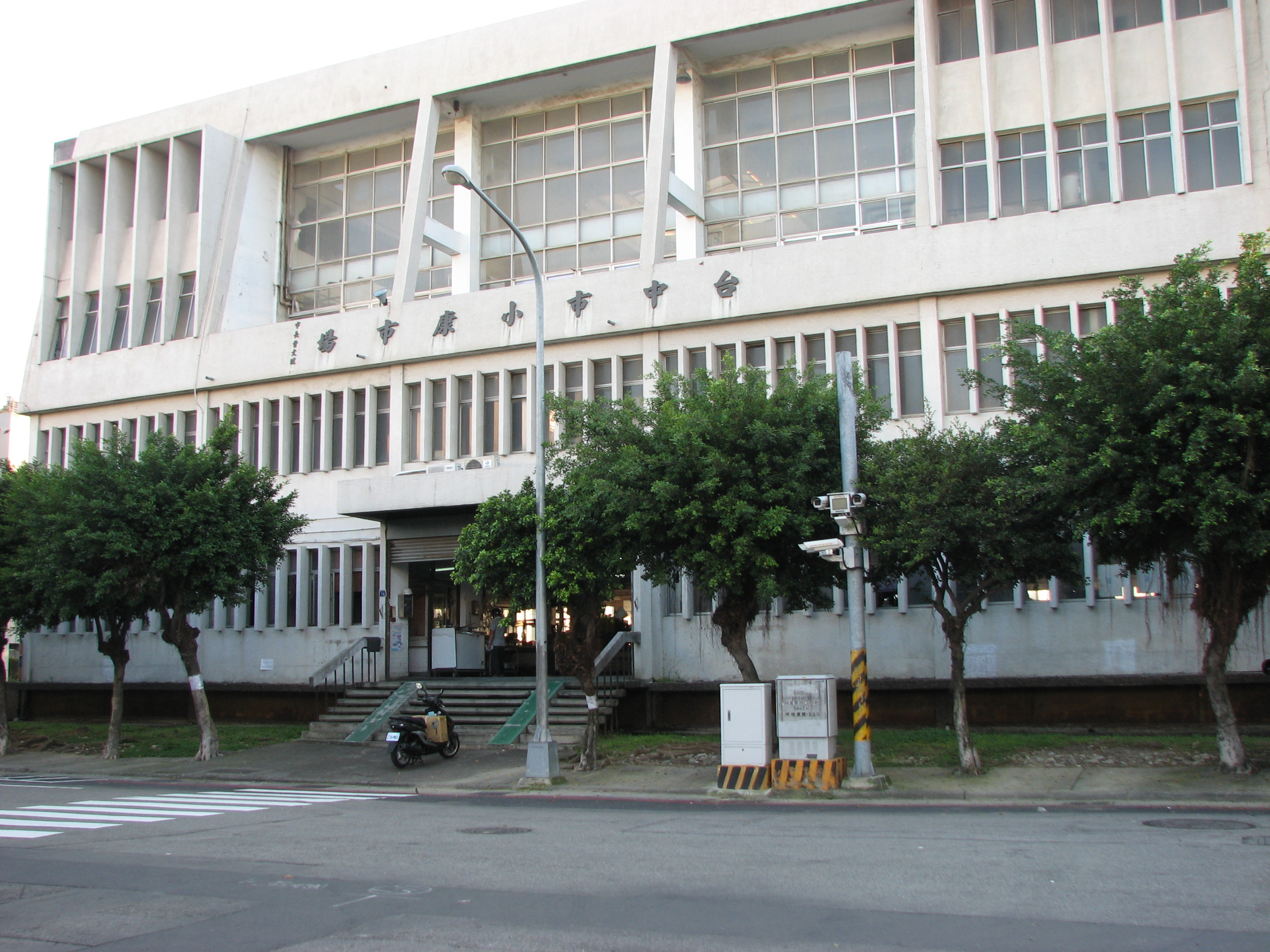
Traditional market

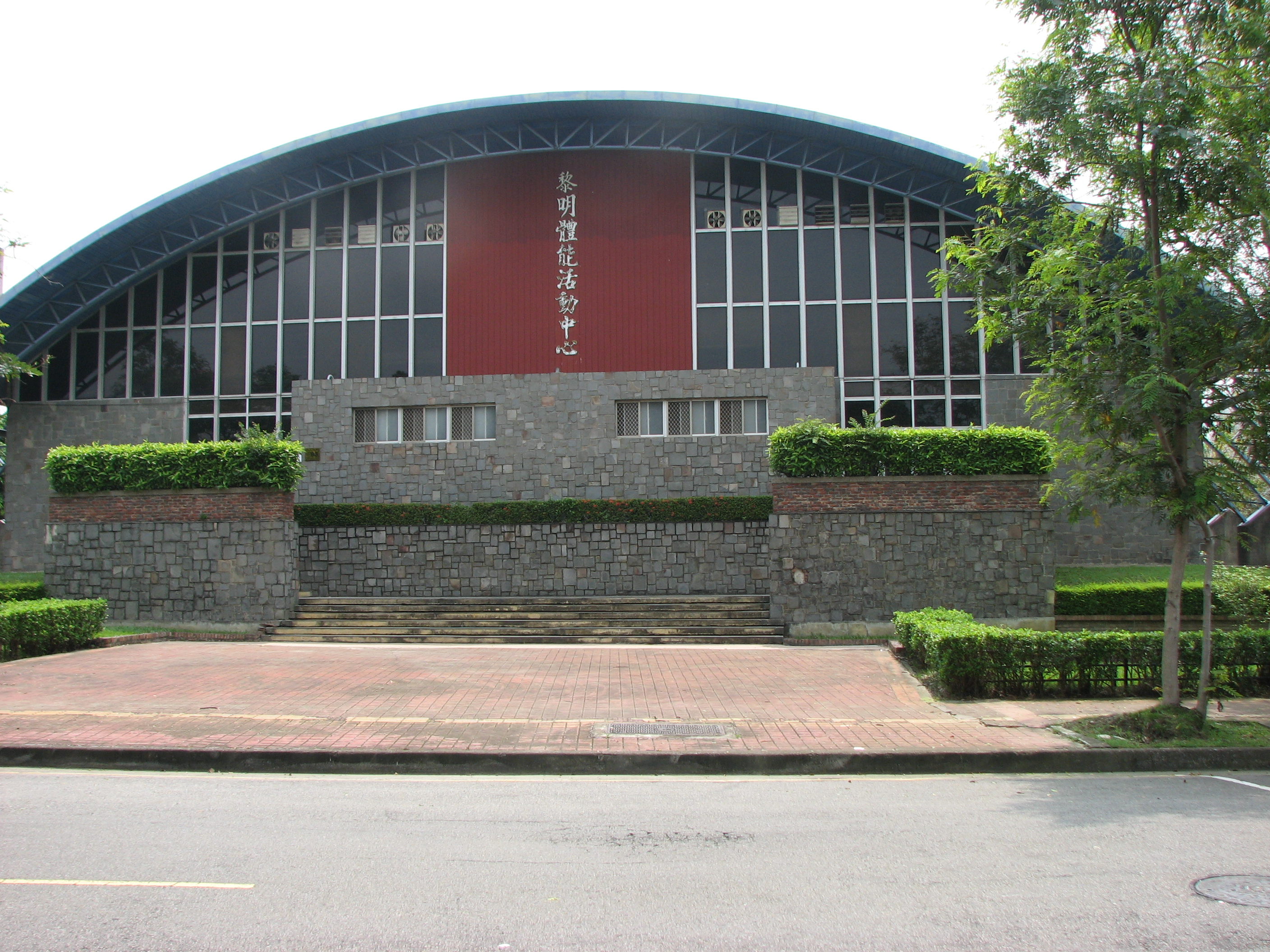
Gymnasium

== See also ==
- Shenji New Village
- Rainbow Village
