= Calligraphy Greenway =

Linear park in West, Taichung, Taiwan

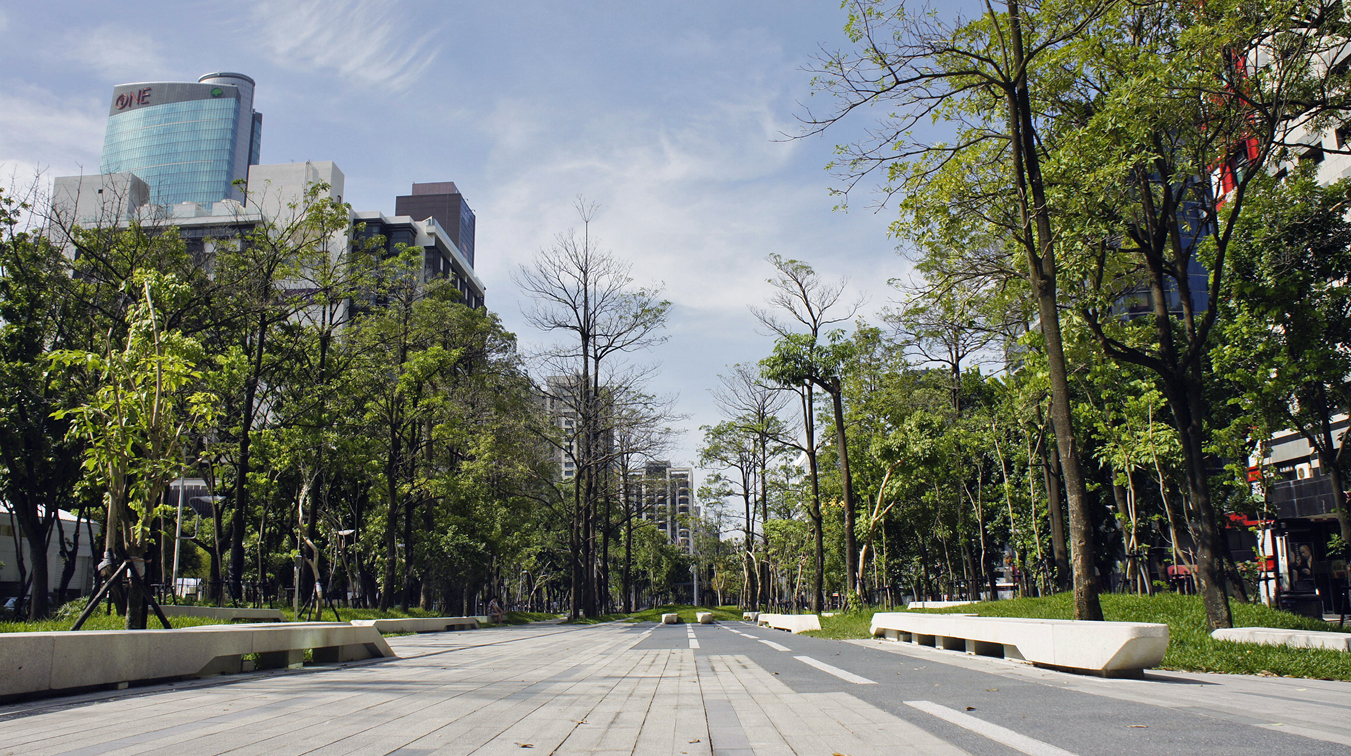
Calligraphy Greenway between PH12 and Civic Square

Calligraphy Greenway (Chinese: 草悟道; pinyin: Cǎowùdào) is a linear park located in West District, Taichung, Taiwan. The name is most commonly used for the section known as the Jingguo Greenway, which connects the National Museum of Natural Science and the National Taiwan Museum of Fine Arts, though earlier plans included the Art Garden, which extends southward from the Museum of Fine Arts to the Liu River. The length of the two sections combined is 3.6 km.

== Etymology ==
The Chinese name for Calligraphy Greenway is derived from Chinese cursive script (Chinese: 草書; pinyin: cǎoshu), which emphasizes artistic expression over legibility. The name was chosen to draw a parallel to the way the park snakes through both busy and quaint neighborhoods of the city, as if written through calligraphy.

== Description ==
=== Jingguo Greenway ===
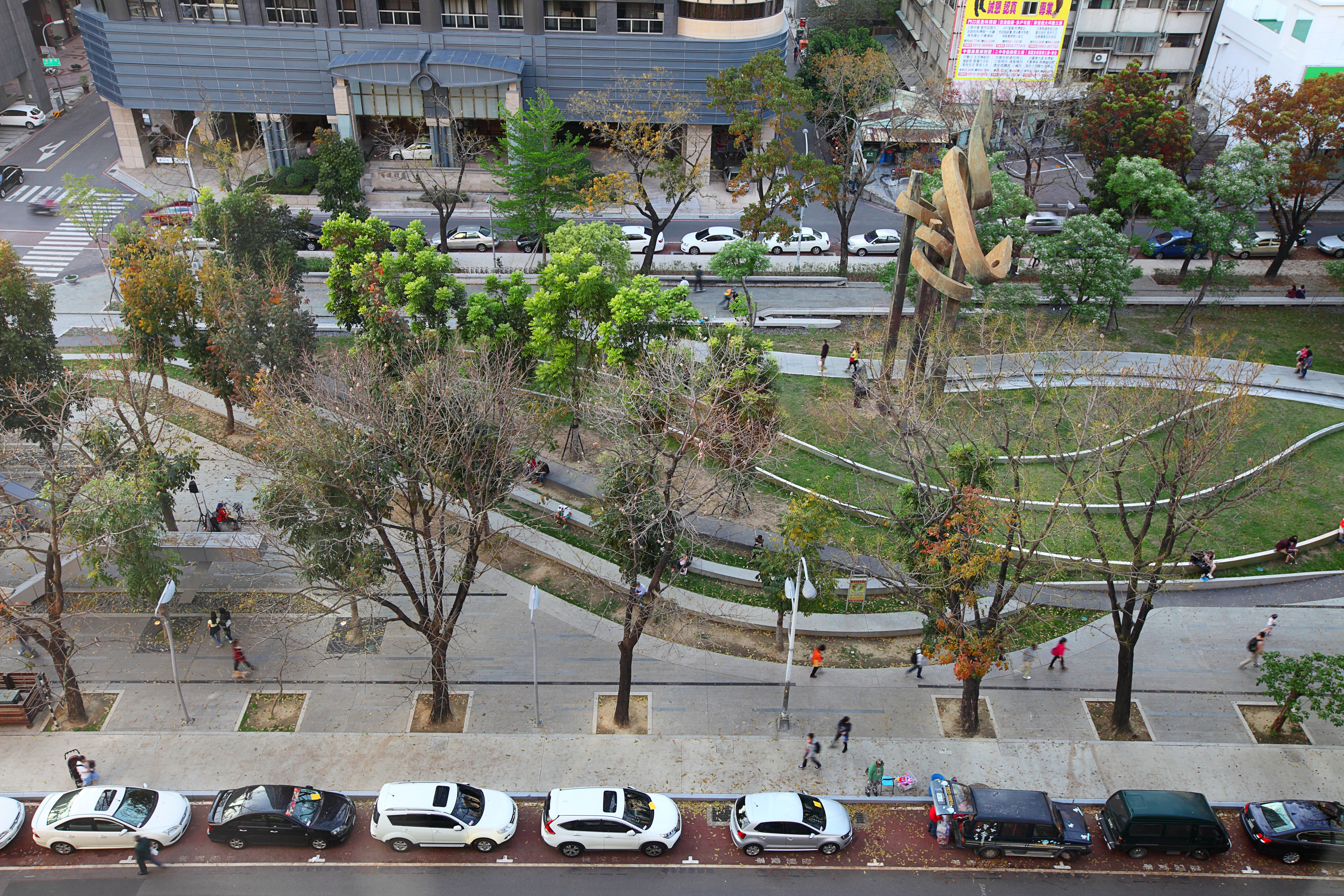
Aerial view of the Jingguo Greenway.

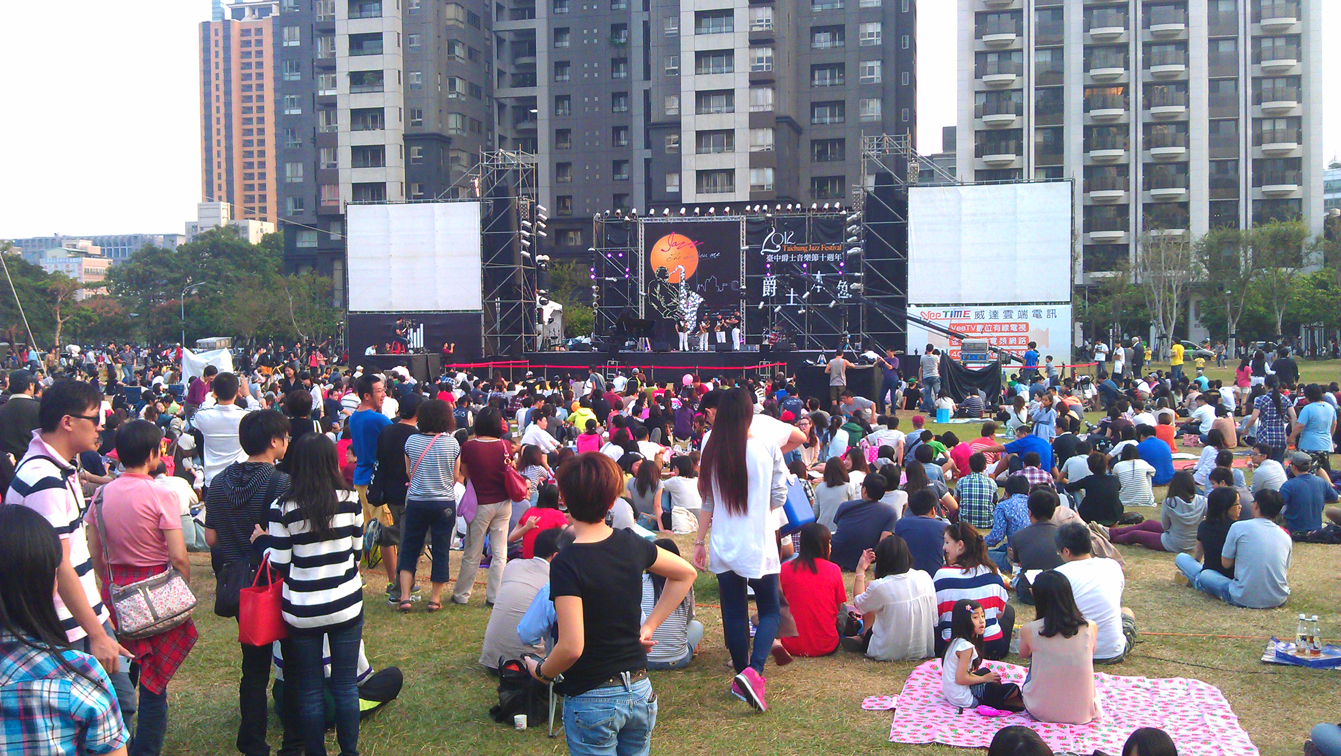
Civic Square during the 2012 Taichung Jazz Festival.

Jingguo Greenway (Chinese: 經國園道; pinyin: Jīngguóyuándào) begins on the south side of National Museum of Natural Science. The section between the museum and Provincial Highway 12 is an installation known as the "Evolutionary Pathway" (生命演化步道). The path begins with a water fountain on the museum side with water flowing along the greenway. Murals on the path depict various creatures present in Earth's evolutionary timeline.

On the other side of the highway, the greenway runs past the National Hotel and Park Lane by CMP (a shopping center) before reaching a large park known as Civic Square (Chinese: 市民廣場; pinyin: Shìmínguǎngchǎng). Both the greenway and the park are designed by American-based engineering firm AECOM and features large stone sculptures and art displays. This section is a popular location for street performances, and Civic Square hosts the annual Taichung Jazz Festival in October. Directly east of Civic Square is Caowu Square (Chinese: 草悟廣場; pinyin: Cǎowùguǎngchǎng), a public space below ground-level with bicycle rentals and parking. The space is also used for seasonal exhibitions. Shr-Hwa International Tower, Taichung's tallest building, is located directly north of Caowu Square. Calligraphy Greenway continues south until it hits the north side of the National Taiwan Museum of Fine Arts.

=== Art Garden ===
Art Garden (Chinese: 美術園道; pinyin: Měishùyuándào) begins on the south side of the National Taiwan Museum of Fine Arts until it hits the Liu River. Like the rest of Calligraphy Greenway, this section also features large public art displays. The sides of the linear park are lined with restaurants.

Art Garden was planned in conjunction with the Jingguo Greenway and the two were originally planned to be collectively called "Calligraphy Greenway". However, in colloquial use, Calligraphy Greenway ends at the art museum and Art Garden is considered as a distinct park.
