= West District, Taichung =

District of Taichung, Taiwan

Coordinates: 24°8′40.3″N 120°39′55.1″E

West 西區
- District
- West District
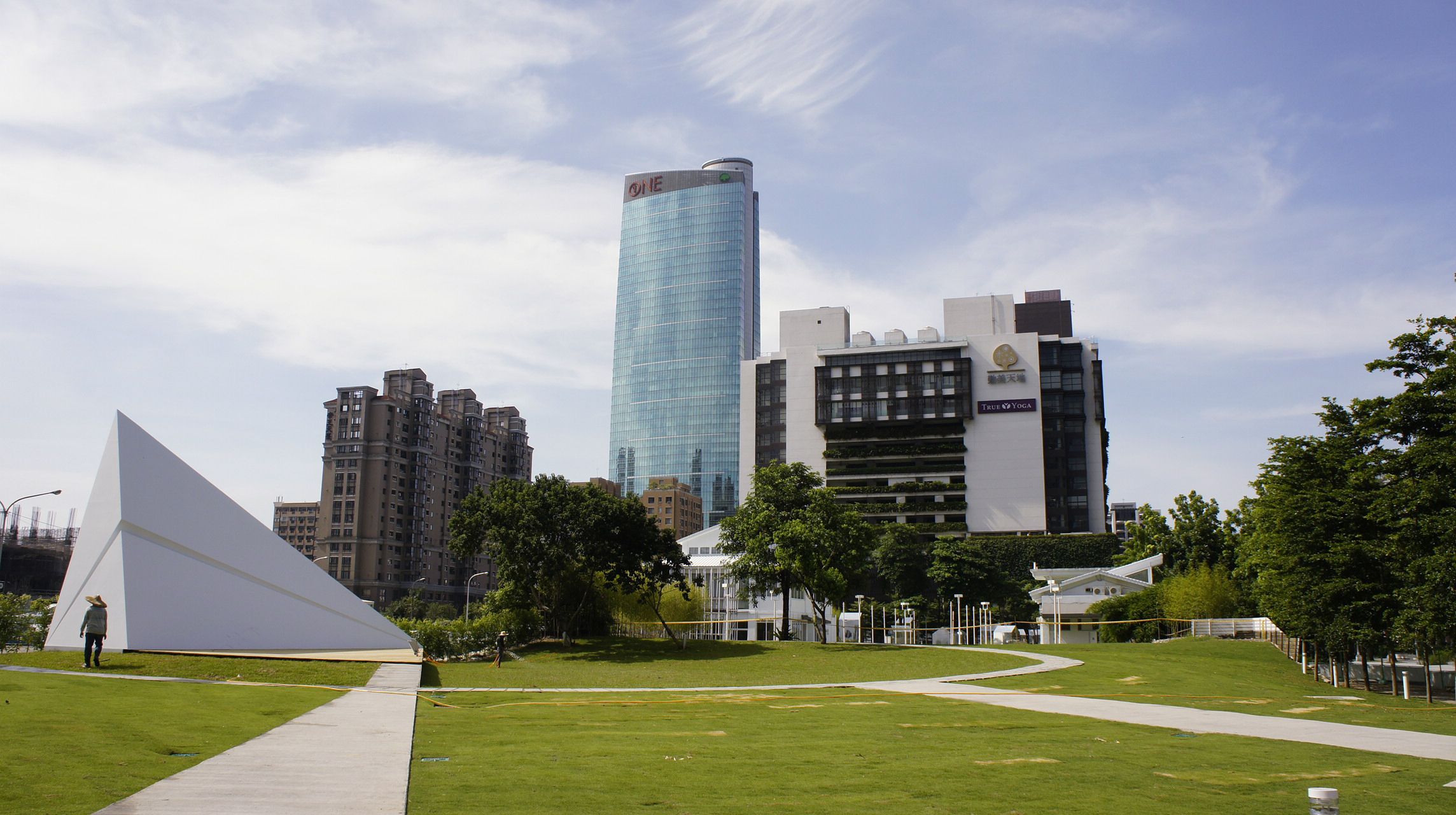
- The CMP Block Museum of Arts with the Shr-Hwa International Tower (middle) and Park Lane by CMP (right) in the background.

- West District in Taichung City
- Country: Taiwan
- Country: Taiwan
- City: Taichung
- Subdivisions: List: 25 villages; 628 neighborhoods

Area
  - Total: 5.7042 km^{2} (2.2024 sq mi)

Population (February 2023)
  - Total: 112,819
  - Density: 19,778/km^{2} (51,225/sq mi)
- Website: www.west.taichung.gov.tw (in Chinese)

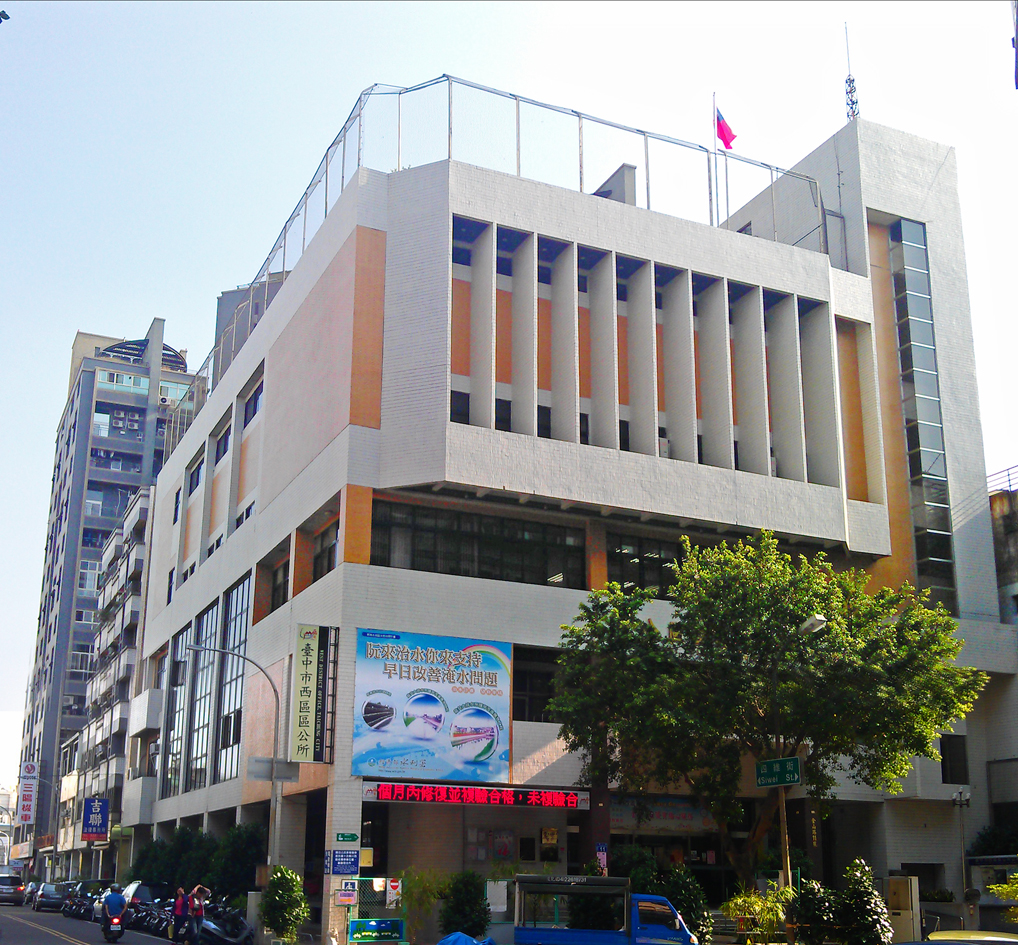
West District office

West District (Chinese: 西區; pinyin: Xi Qū) is a district of Taichung, Taiwan. It is the second smallest district in Taichung City after Central District. Former Taichung City Hall and part of Taichung City Government offices are located in this district.

== History ==
The district used to be part of Taichung provincial city before the merger with Taichung County to form Taichung special municipality on 25 December 2010.

== Division ==
The West District of Taichung is divided into 25 Li (里):

- Minsheng Li (民生里)
- Liming Li (利民里)
- Sanmin Li (三民里)
- Dongsheng Li (東昇里)
- Guangmin Li (廣民里)
- Pinghe Li (平和里)
- Gongmin Li (公民里)
- Lanxing Li (藍興里)
- Gongguan (公館里)
- Helong Li (和龍里)
- Minlong (民龍里)
- Houlong (後龍里)
- Shuanglong Li (雙龍里)
- Anlong Li (安龍里)
- Jilong (吉龍里)
- Tuku Li (土庫里)
- Dazhong Li (大忠里)
- Shengping Li (昇平里)
- Zhongming Li (忠明里)
- Zhongcheng Li (忠誠里)
- Gongzheng Li (公正里)
- Gongping Li (公平里)
- Gongde Li (公德里)
- Gongyi Li (公益里)
- Zhongxing Li (中興里)

== Education ==
- National Taichung University of Education

== Tourism ==
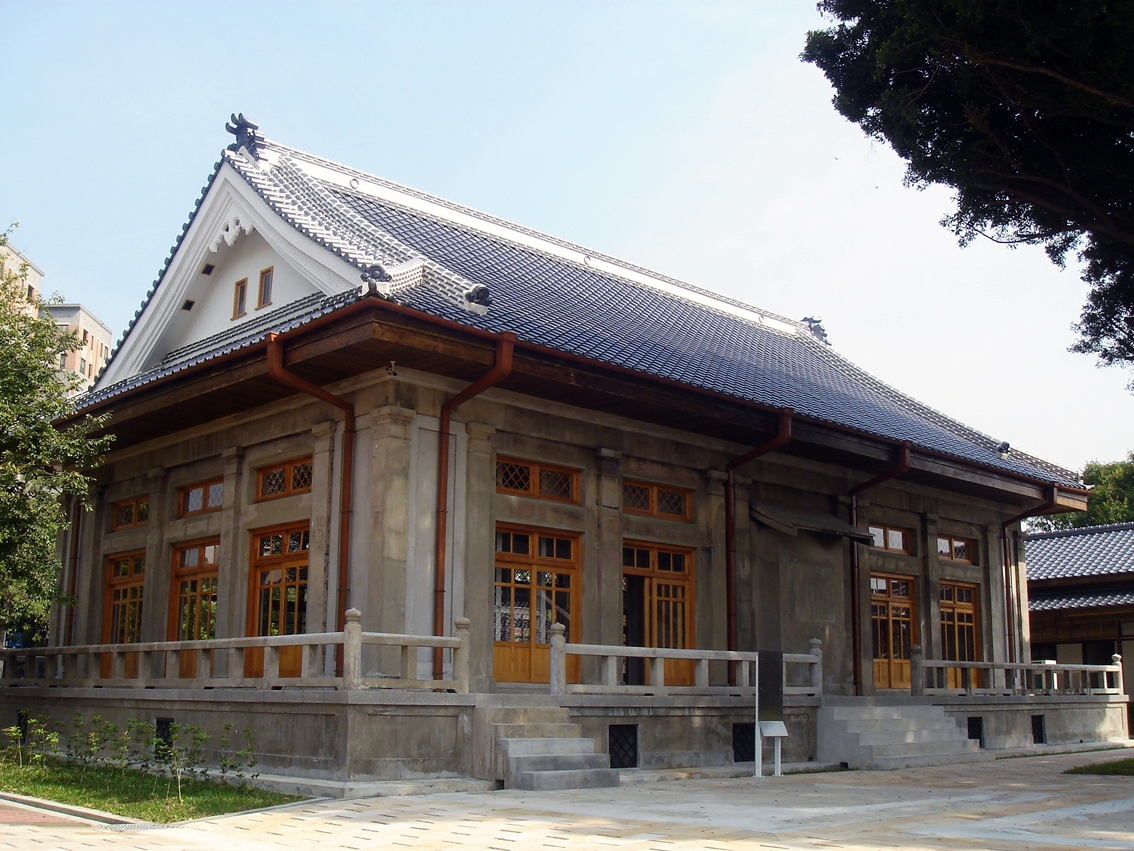
Taichung Takenori Hall

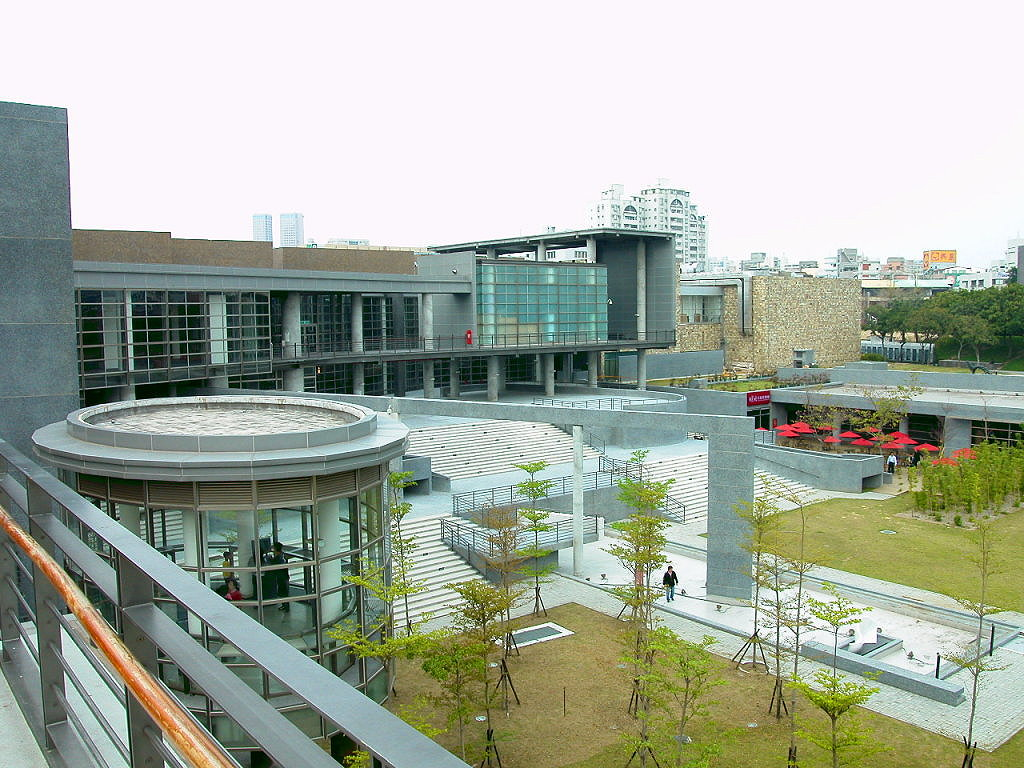
National Taiwan Museum of Fine Art

=== Historic sites ===
- Shenji New Village
- Taichung Shiyakusho
- Taichung Prefectural Hall
- Taichung City Hall
- Datun Region Hall
- Taichung Takenori Hall
- National Taichung University of Education Administrative Building
- Datung Elementary School Administrative Building
- Sun Li-jen Former Residence
- Lin Chih-Chu Studio

=== Museums and arts ===
- National Museum of Natural Science
- National Taiwan Museum of Fine Arts
- Taichung City Dadun Cultural Center
- Taichung Literature Museum
- Taichung Municipal Cultural Center (台中市立文化中心)
- Tea Street (精明一街)
- Dalu Road Commercial District
- Calligraphy Greenway

== See also ==
- Taichung
