= Shenji New Village =

Former dormitory in West, Taichung, Taiwan

- 審計新村
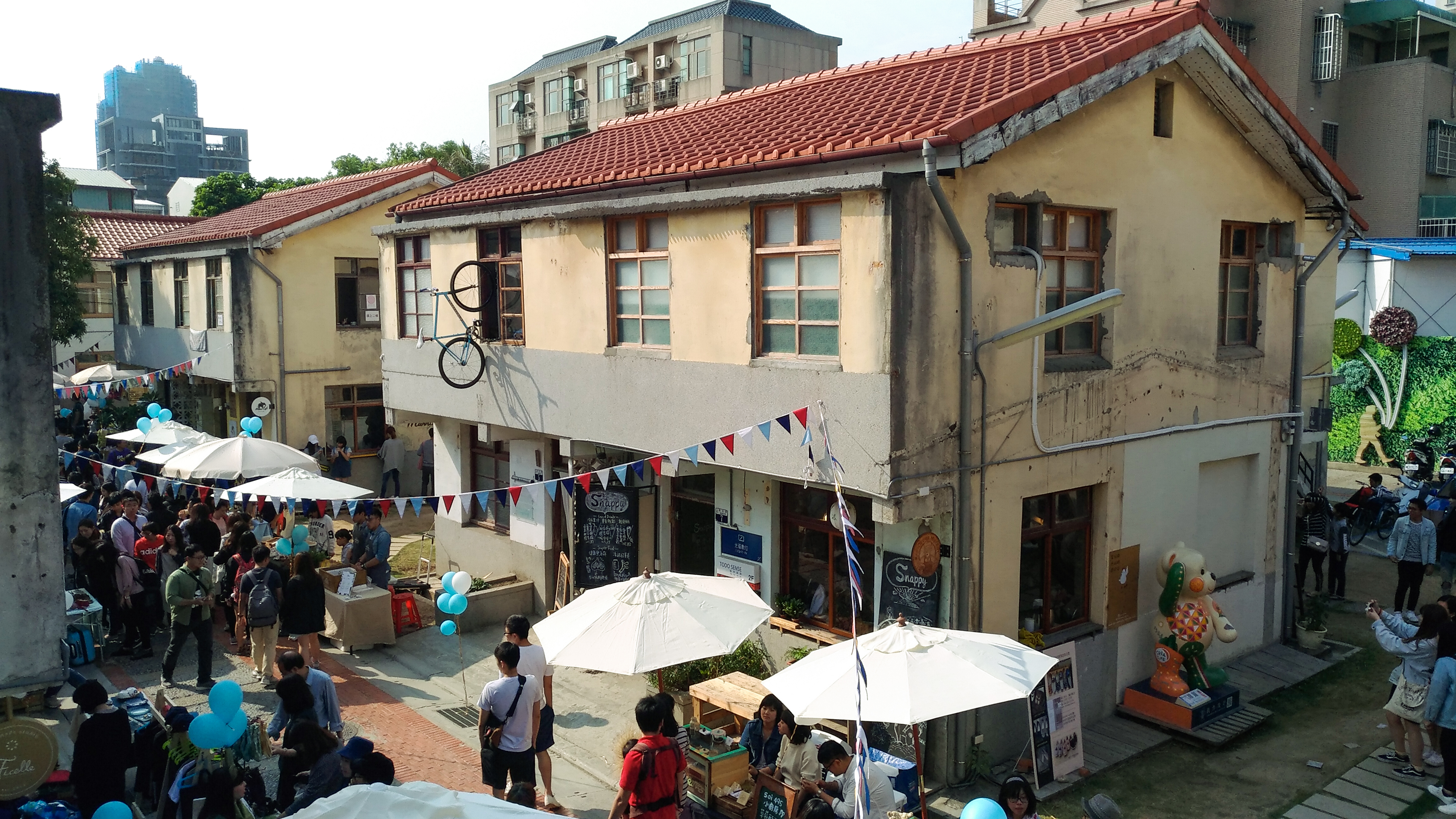
- Interactive map of the Shenji New Village area

General information
- Type: cultural and creative center
- Location: West, Taichung, Taiwan
- Coordinates: 24°08′40.6″N 120°39′46.3″E

Technical details
- Floor area: 0.52 hectares

The Shenji New Village (traditional Chinese: 審計新村; simplified Chinese: 审计新村; pinyin: Shěnjì Xīncūn) is a former dormitory area in West District, Taichung, Taiwan.

== History ==
The place used to be the dormitory area built by the Taiwan Provincial Government for the residence of auditing office employees. It was then redeveloped into a cultural and creative center.

== Architecture ==
The area features artist studios, creative shops and markets which spans over an area of 0.52 hectares.

== See also ==
- Liming New Village
