= Taichung Shiyakusho =

Former government building in West, Taichung, Taiwan

Taichū Shiyakusho
- 臺中市役所
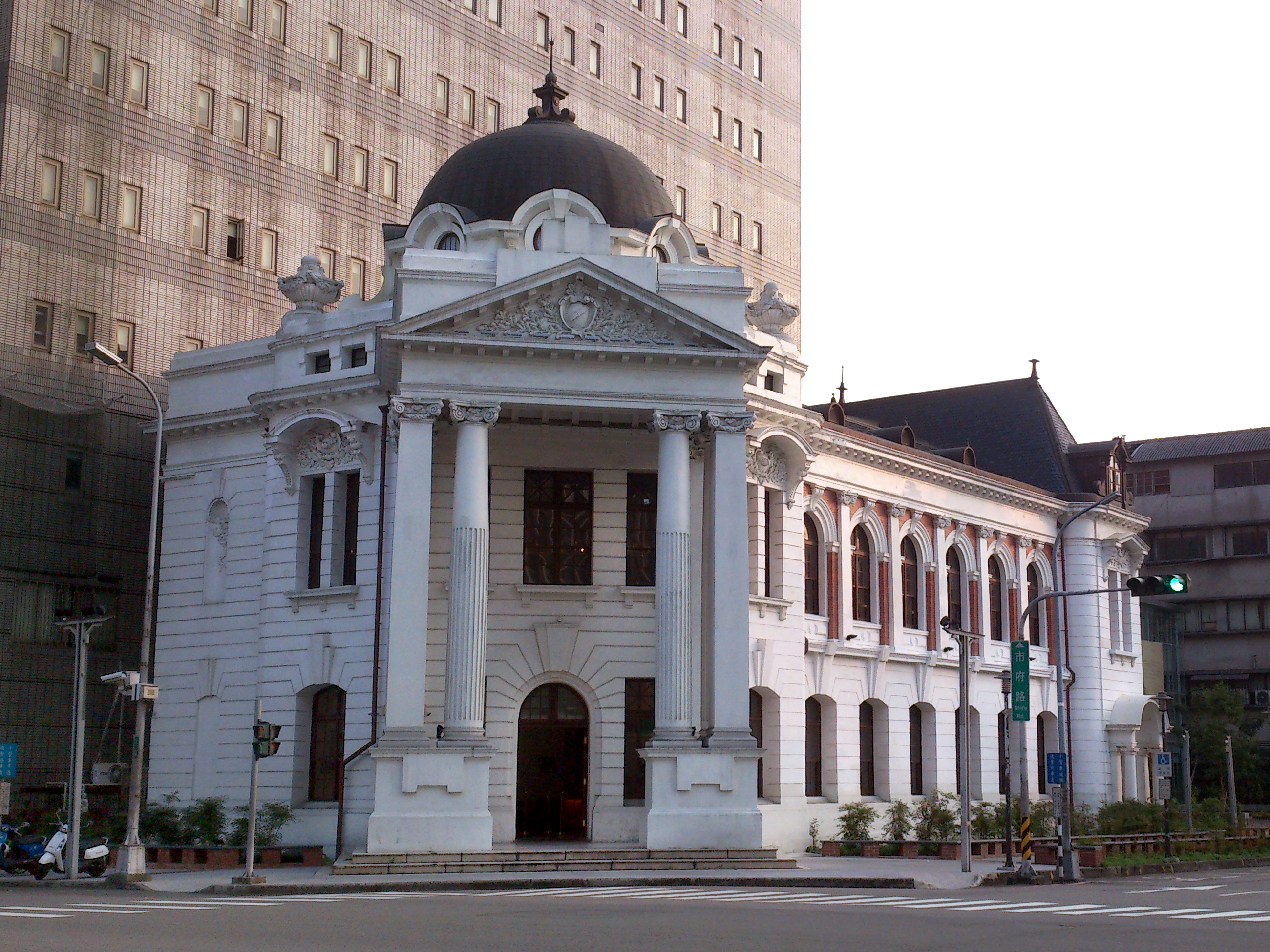
- Interactive map of the Taichū Shiyakusho area

General information
- Type: café, art center
- Architectural style: baroque
- Location: West, Taichung, Taiwan
- Coordinates: 24°08′17.9″N 120°40′44.5″E
- Current tenants: Café 1911
- Completed: 1911
- Opened: February 2016
- Owner: Taichung City Government

Technical details
- Floor count: 3

The Taichū Shiyakusho (traditional Chinese: 臺中市役所; simplified Chinese: 台中市役所; pinyin: Táizhōng Shì yì suǒ, Japanese: Taichū Shiyakusho) is a historical building in West District, Taichung, Taiwan.

== History ==
The building was constructed in 1911 as a municipal building under the Japanese rule of Taiwan. The building underwent renovation in 2014 and was reopened in February 2016 as a café and art center.

== Architecture ==
The building is a three-story Baroque-style structure. The ground floor houses the Café 1911 which is operated by Rose House Group. The two upper floors house an art center.

== Transportation ==
The building is accessible within walking distance west of Taichung Station of Taiwan Railway.

== See also ==
- List of tourist attractions in Taiwan
