= Park Lane by CMP =

Shopping center in West, Taichung, Taiwan

- 勤美誠品綠園道

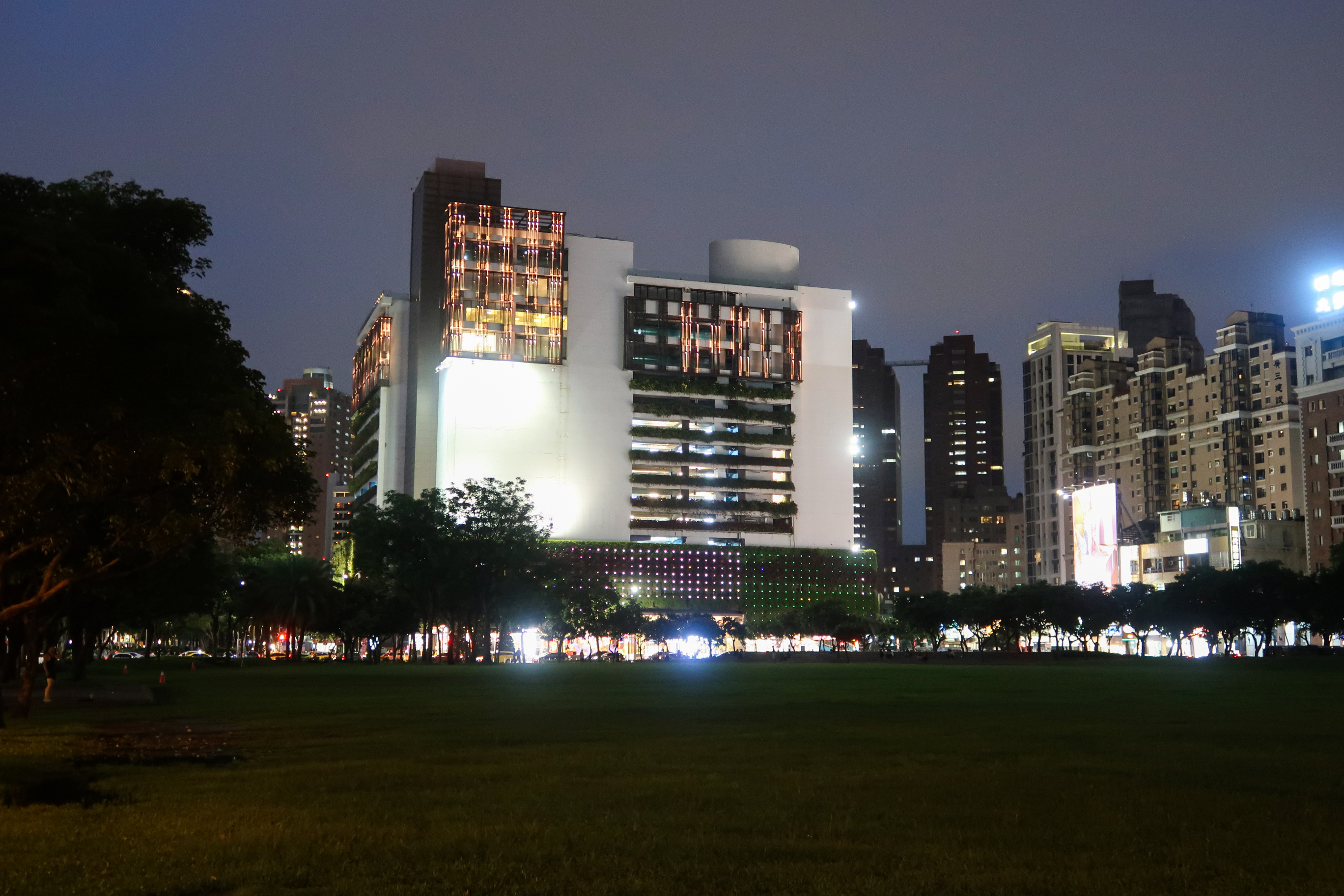
- Park Lane by CMP as seen from Civic Square
- Location: West District, Taichung, Taiwan
- Coordinates: 24.1513°N 120.6638°E
- Opened: 28 May 2008
- Floors: 17 above ground, 2 underground
- Parking: Yes
- Website: parklane.com.tw

Park Lane by CMP (Chinese: 勤美誠品綠園道; pinyin: Qínměichéngpǐn Lǜyuándào) is a shopping center located West District, Taichung, Taiwan. The shopping center is jointly operated by the CMP Group and Eslite Bookstore.

== History ==
The building was first built as the Guangsan Dadiwang Building (廣三大地王大樓) in 1996. Within the building, the Guangsan Group operated a shopping center and a parking lot within the building in a design similar to the current layout. However, in 2005, the Guansan Group found itself in financial trouble, and in the ensuing legal procedures, the Dadiwang Building was seized due to tax evasion. The CMP Group acquired the building for $1.7 billion NTD during a court auction and decided to operate a shopping center in conjunction with Eslite Bookstore. The shopping center reopened in May 2008.

== Overview ==
Park Lane by CMP is located directly adjacent to Calligraphy Greenway, a major linear park. The shopping center has 15 floors above ground and 2 below, out of which floors 4 to 11 are parking spaces. Eslite Bookstore occupies the entire 3rd floor along with a store on the 2nd floor dedicated to stationery. The B1 floor is dedicated to dining.

One of the defining features of the building is its large green walls present in both the interior and exterior of the building. The green wall on the exterior features the Madagascar periwinkle plant and wraps around the entire building, while the interior green wall spans several floors. CMP Group claims that the walls absorb 200 kg of carbon dioxide and release 150 kg of oxygen a day. At its completion, the exterior green wall was the largest of its type within Asia.
