= National Taichung University of Education =

Education university in Taichung, Taiwan

- 國立臺中教育大學
- Motto: 忠毅勤樸
- Type: Public (National)
- Established: 1899
- President: Yang Szu-wei (楊思偉)
- Academic staff: 249
- Students: 5,000
- Undergraduates: 3,129
- Postgraduates: 1,525
- Location: Taichung, Taiwan; 24.1433°N 120.6717°E
- Campus: Urban, 100,497 square metres (24.833 acres)
- Affiliations: National University System of Taiwan
- Website: www.ntcu.edu.tw/eng/

National Taichung University of Education
- Traditional Chinese: 國立臺中教育大學
- Simplified Chinese: 国立台中教育大学
Transcriptions
Standard Mandarin
- Hanyu Pinyin: Guólì Táizhōng Jiàoyù Dàxué

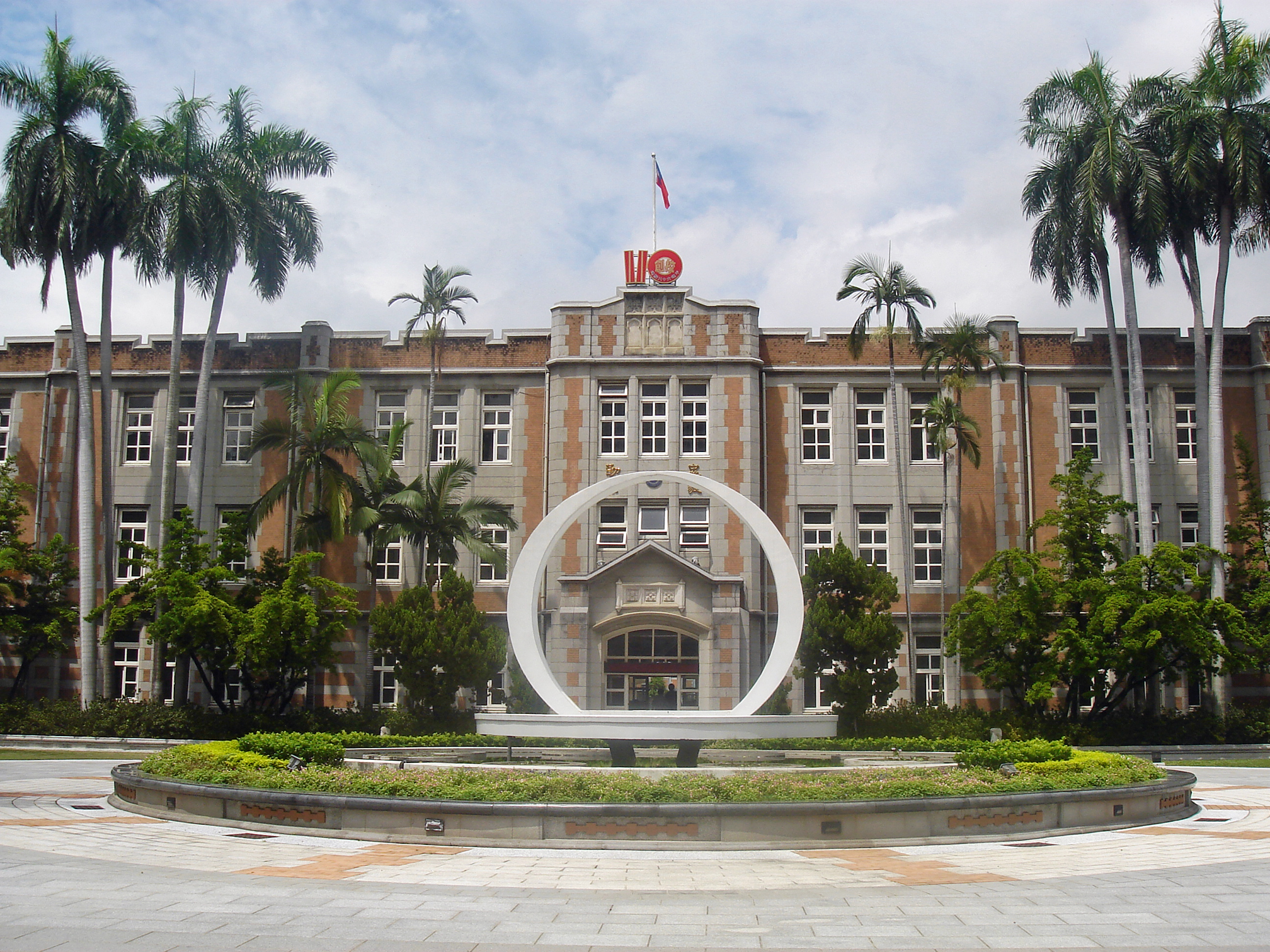
National Taichung University of Education

The National Taichung University of Education (NTCU; Chinese: 國立臺中教育大學; pinyin: Guólì Táizhōng Jiàoyù Dàxué) is a university in West District, Taichung, Taiwan. Founded in 1899 at the Confucian Temple in Changhwa county, it moved to the current site in 1923.

In 2005, the university was renamed National Taichung University of Education. NTCU had a College of Education, College of Humanities and Liberal Arts, and College of Mathematics and Information Science.

== History ==
In 1899, the school was established in the Changhua Wunwu Temple.

In 1902, the school was suspended and the students were transferred to the Taiwan Mandarin School and Tainan Normal School. In April 1923, the school was reestablished and classes were temporarily held in the Taichung Public School building (formerly named Chung-Hsiao Elementary School). A practical program was established with a maximum study period of seven years.

In April 1928, the main building (Administration Building) of the school was completed and an affiliated elementary school was established.

In April 1943, the school was upgraded to a teachers' school (junior college).

During the Japanese occupation of Taiwan in World War II, the school was administered by the Taiwan Governor-General Administration. In December 1945, the Nationalist government took over the school, which was renamed the Taiwan Provincial Taichung Normal School. A three-year program of general courses was instituted for junior high and vocational junior high graduates.

In September 1960, the school was upgraded and renamed the Taiwan Provincial Junior Teachers College, and a three-year program of elementary education courses was instituted for general and special education teachers, and senior high and vocational senior high graduates. In August 1963, the school initiated a five-year day program and an evening-school program for the training of elementary school teachers.

In July 1987, the school was upgraded and renamed the Taiwan Provincial Taichung Teachers College, which was composed of the Elementary Education Department, Language and Literacy Education Department, Social Studies Education Department, Mathematics and Science Education Department, and Early Childhood Teacher Education Program.

In July 1991, the college became affiliated with the Ministry of Education and was renamed the National Taichung Teachers College. In August 1992, the college established the Graduate Institute of Elementary Education (renamed the Graduate Institute of Elementary and Secondary Education in August 1995), the Department of Early Childhood Education, and the Department of Fine Arts and Crafts Education.

In August 1993, the college established the Department of Music Education and the Department of Special Education. In August 1997, the college established the Graduate Institute of Educational Measurement and Statistics. In August 1998, the college established the Department of Physical Education and the Graduate Institute of Environmental Education, and divided the Mathematics and Science Education Department into the Department of Mathematics Education and the Department of Natural Science Education (including the master's program).

In August 1999, the college established a master's program in the Department of Mathematics Education. In August 2000, the college established the Graduate Institute of Counseling and Educational Psychology and a doctoral program in the Graduate Institute of Elementary and Secondary Education. In August 2001, the college established the Graduate Institute of Special Education and Assistive Technology and a master's program in the Department of Language and Literacy Education. In August 2002, the college established a master's program in the Department of Social Studies Education. In August 2003, the college established the Department of Early Childhood Education and a master's program in the Department of Fine Arts and Crafts. In August 2004, the college established the Department of Taiwanese Languages, the Department of Information Science, a doctoral program in the Department of Language and Literacy Education, the Graduate Institute of Curriculum and Instruction, the Graduate Institute of Instructional Technology, and the Graduate Institute of Early Intervention. The Graduate Institute of Elementary and Secondary Education and the Department of Elementary Education were combined and named the Department of Elementary and Secondary Education.

In August 2005, the college was upgraded and renamed the National Taichung University (NTCU), and the Department of English Education, the Department of Digital Content and Technology, the master's program in the Department of Physical Education, the master's program in the Department of Music Education, and the doctoral program in the Graduate Institute of Educational Measurement and Statistics were all established.

In August 2006, the Department of Elementary and Secondary Education was renamed the Department of Education; the Department of Fine Arts and Crafts Education was renamed the Department of Fine Arts; the Department of Music Education was renamed the Department of Music; the Department of Natural Science Education was renamed the Department of Science Application and Dissemination; the Department of English Education was renamed the Department of English; the Graduate Institute of Counseling and Educational Psychology established an undergraduate program and was renamed the Department of Counseling and Applied Psychology; the Graduate Institute of Special Education and Assistive Technology was merged into the Department of Special Education; and the Graduate Institute of Instructional Technology was merged into the Department of Digital Content and Technology.

In August 2008, the university added the Department of International Business, the Graduate Institute of Business Administration, the Graduate Institute of Tourism and Recreation Management, and the bachelor's degree Program of Cultural and Creative Industrial Development.

In January 2009, NTCU set up the Contact Office for National Taichung University in Bangkok Thailand and also contracted with Rajamangala University of Technology in Thailand. In March 2009, NTCU contracted and consulted joint program with Kent State University, USA. In April 2009, NTCU contracted with Changchun Normal University, China. In June 2009, NTCU contracted with Ashland University, USA. Department of Social Studies Education, NTCU, signed up the memorandum of joint program with Kent State University.

In July 2009, NTCU held the 2009 China and Taiwan student debate competition. NTCU contracted with University of Da Nang, Hanoi National University of Education, Hanoi University, University of Economics Ho Chi Minh City, Ho Chi Minh City University of Education, ...etc., in Vietnam and Zhangzhou City University, China.

In October 2009, NTCU opened up the overseas Chinese Language MA Program. In December 2009, NTCU established Sustainable Tourism Center and contracted with Zhanjiang Normal University, China. In January 2010, NTCU was awarded “2008 Friendly Campus” from MOE and contracted with HUE University, College of Sciences and Humanities in HUE, College of Education in HUE, and College of Economics in HUE, Vietnam.

In February 2010, “Teacher Model ‧ Poetry Trail” public art on campus (「師道‧詩道」校園公共藝術) was opened.

In April 2010, NTCU contracted with Tianjin Normal University. In June 2010, NTCU contracted with Osaka Kyoiku University, Japan.

In August 2010, the English name of university was changed to the National Taichung University of Education (NTCU).

In August 2010, Dr. Yang Szu-Wei reappointed as the president of NTCU.

== University profile and statistics ==
- Distribution of Faculty by Rank
  - Professors: 46 (23.83%)
  - Associate Professors: 86 (44.55%)
  - Assistant Professors: 49(26.94%)
  - Instructors: 9 (4.66%)
- Educational Background of Faculty
  - Doctorate: 164 (84.97%)
  - Master's: 29 (15.02%)
  - Number of Students: 4,654
  - Undergraduates: 3,129(67.23%)
  - Graduate Students: 717(15.41%)
  - Doctoral Students: 94(2.02%)
  - Extension Education: 714(15.34%)
- Total Area of the University: 12.0827 hectares
  - Main (Minsheng) Campus: 7.9227 hectares
  - Yingtsai Campus : 2.06 hectares
  - Affiliated Experimental Elementary School: 2.1 hectares
- Total Floor Space: 97,382 square meters

== Academic departments ==
- College of Education
  - Department of Education (with MA/PhD)
  - Department of Special Education (with MA)
  - Department of Physical Education (with MA)
  - Department of Early Childhood Education (with MA)
  - Graduate Institute of Educational Measurement and Statistics (with PhD)
- College of Management
  - Department of International Business
  - Bachelor's degree Program of Cultural & Creative Industrial Development
  - Master Program of Business Administration
  - Master Program of Sustainable Tourism and Recreation Management
- College of Science
  - Department of Mathematics Education (with MS)
  - Department of Computer and Information Science (with MS)
  - Department of Digital Content and Technology (with MS)
  - Department of Science Application and Dissemination (with MS)
- College of Humanities
  - Department of Regional and Social Development (with MA)
  - Department of Taiwanese Languages and Literature
  - Department of Language and Literacy Education (with MA/PhD)
  - Department of English
  - Department of Counseling and Applied Psychology (with MA)
  - Department of Music (with MA)
  - Department of Fine Arts (with MA)
- National Taichung University of Education official English website (For foreign students)

=== Faculty professional development ===
On February 1, 2007, the Center for Faculty Professional Development was established with an aim to assist the school faculty in improving teaching quality.

== Services ==
=== Library resources and services ===
The library is located at the north side of the campus. The library collection currently has more than 810,000 items, which includes 337,874 volumes of Chinese and foreign books, 170,580 kinds of e-books, 682 kinds of serials publications, 11,480 kinds of e-journals, 73 kinds of databases, 18,997 audio materials, 269,917 filmcards and newspapers, maps ... etc.

=== Information system service ===
The Computer Center provides information system and networking services for the faculty.

- National Taichung University's Administrative System
- FTP space, on-line forum, blog and wiki services
- E-learning system
- Campus portal
- PC troubleshooting service
- Laboratory practice and printing service
- Site licensed software including Windows XP, Windows Vista, Office XP/2003/2007, and antivirus software.

== Education ==
=== General education ===
Starting from 2004, the General Education courses were divided into six categories.

- Languages and Literature (2 credits): domestic languages, foreign languages, appreciation of literature, classics, etc.
- Humanities and Social Science (4 credits): philosophy, social sciences, cultural studies, law, civic education, interpersonal communication, etc.
- Mathematics and Information Science (4 credits): mathematics, natural sciences, technology and information science, etc.
- Art education (4 credits): music, fine arts, dance, etc.
- Physical and Health education (2 credits): health education, sports, physical education, etc.
- Comprehensive education (2 credits): national defense education, general education lecture series, science and technology integration, etc.

=== Teacher education ===
The Teacher Education Center consists of two divisions: (1) Curriculum and Instruction; (2) Practicum and Counseling. The Division of Curriculum and Instruction is in charge of: (1) the selection of applicants for elementary education, young children education, special education, and general education programs; (2) the curriculum plan and course selection of the education programs; and (3) the selection, training, and evaluation of the Scholarship for Excellence in Teacher Education. The Division of Practicum and Guidance is responsible for: (1) organizing activities of education guidance for the local areas; (2) assisting students in their teacher education practicum, graduate internship, and teacher education forum; (3) accrediting the teacher qualification examination; and (4) publishing pamphlets or journals related to teacher education. d to prepare loving and dedicated educators.

== See also ==
- List of universities in Taiwan
