= Taichung City Government =

Government of Taichung City, Taiwan

Coordinates: 24.1617°N 120.6470°E

- 台中市政府
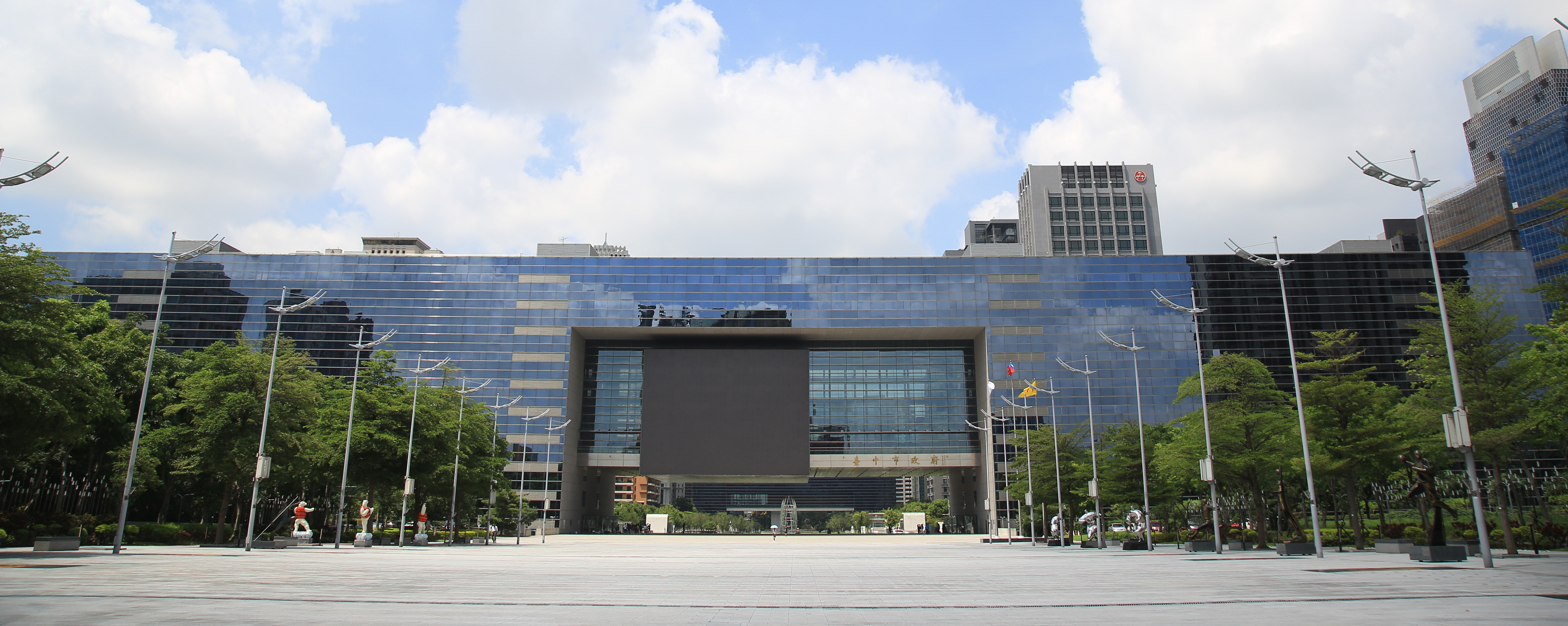

Agency overview
- Formed: 1 October 1920
- Preceding agencies: Taichū City Government (colonial era); Taichung City Government Taichung County Government
- Jurisdiction: Taichung City
- Headquarters: Xitun District
- Agency executives: Lu Shiow-yen, Mayor; Bruce Linghu, Deputy Mayor
- Website: Official website

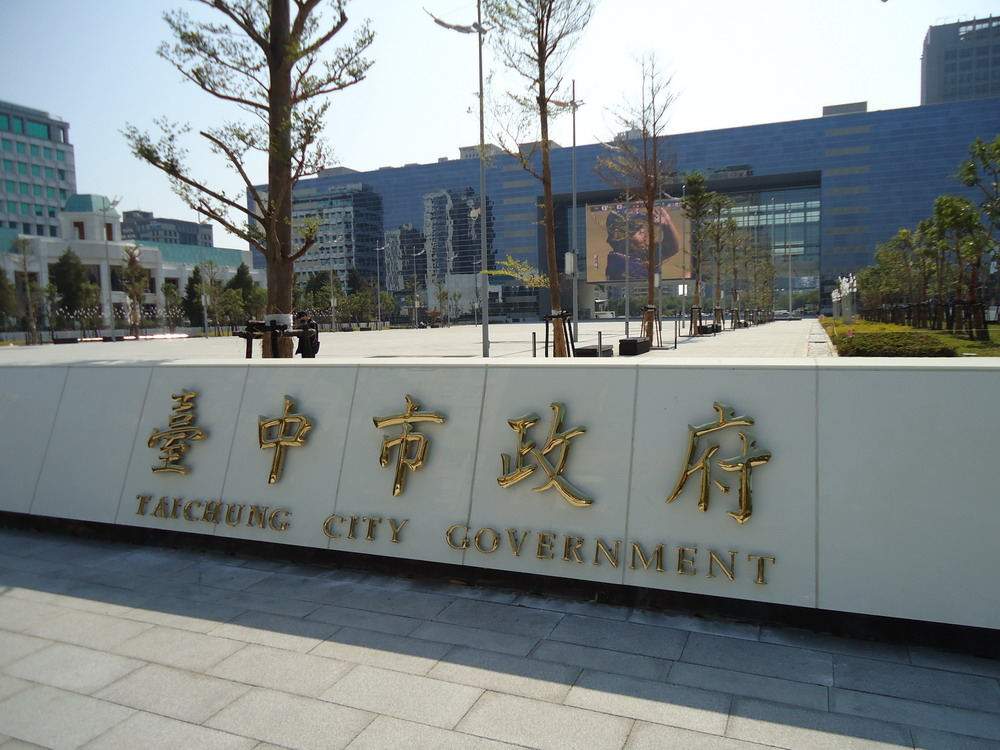
Taichung City Hall

The Taichung City Government (Chinese: 台中市政府; pinyin: Táizhōng Shì Zhèngfǔ) is the municipal government of Taichung.

== History ==
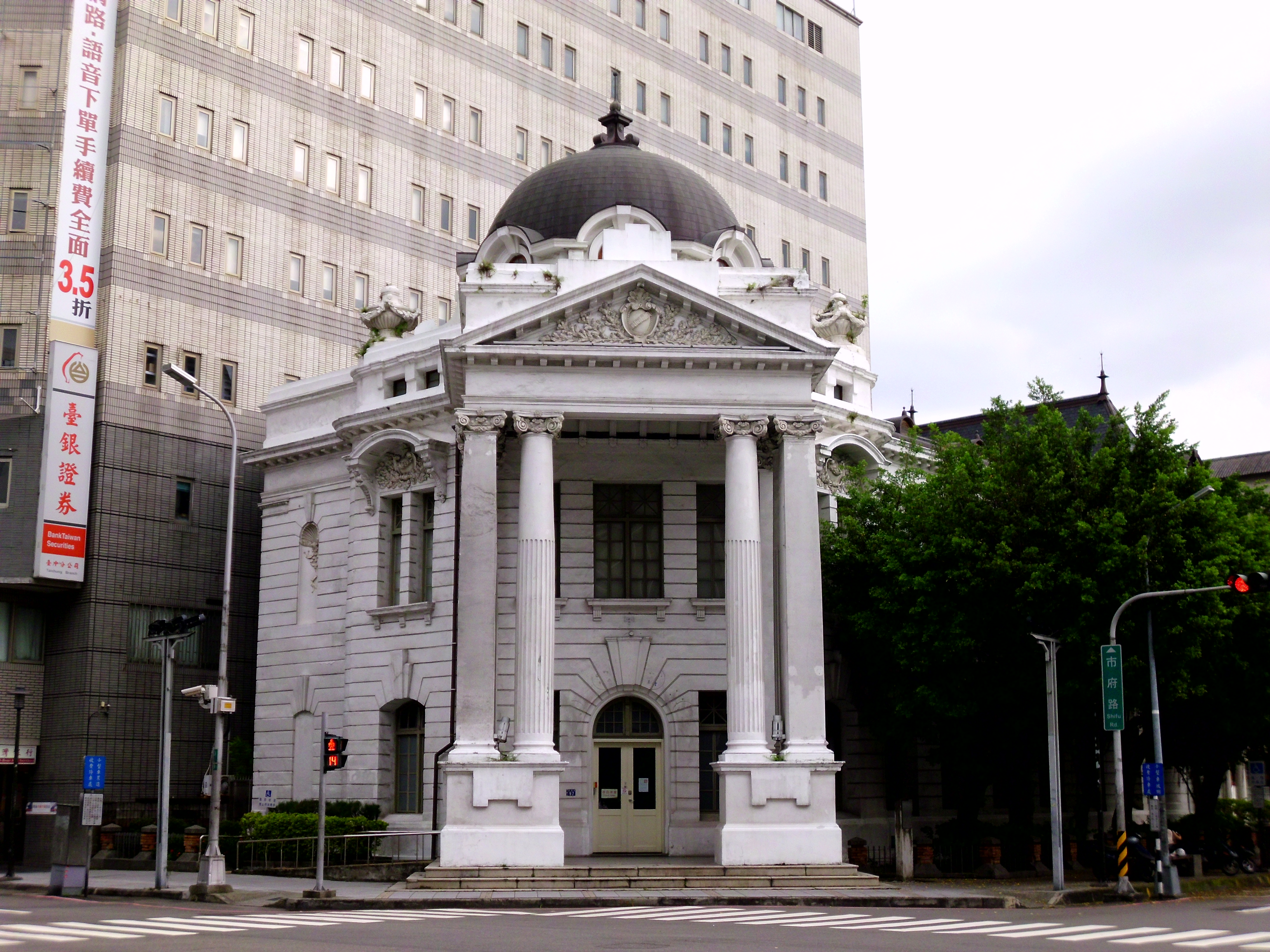
Taichung City Hall (1920-1945)

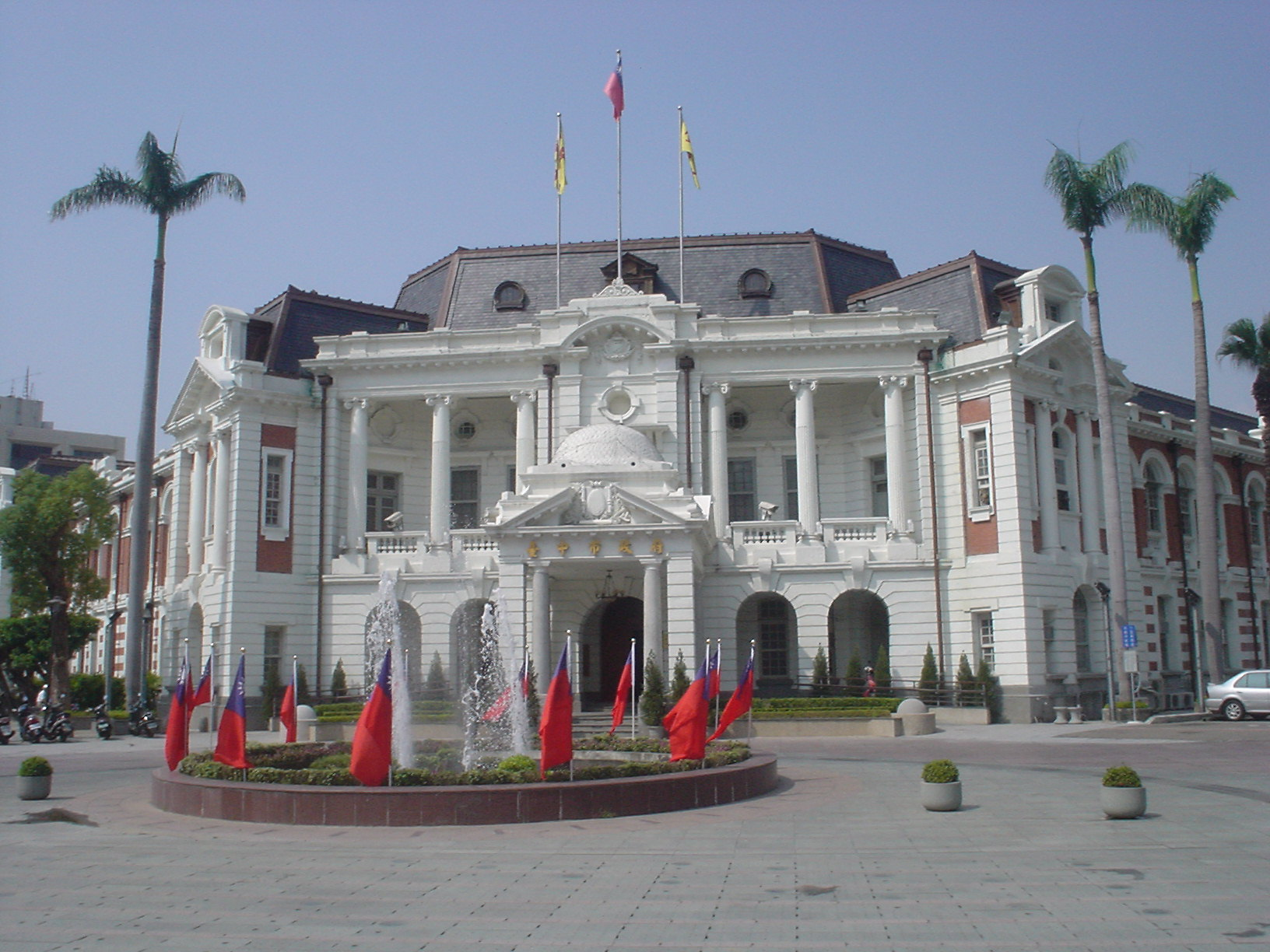
Taichung City Hall (1945-2010)

Taichū City Government was established by the Governor-General of Taiwan and the Japanese colonial authorities on 1 October 1920. Following the handover of Taiwan from Japan to the Republic of China, Taichung had been reconstituted as a provincial city government on 25 October 1945. Taichung City merged with Taichung County to become a special municipality on 25 December 2010.

== Building ==
The first Taichung city hall, known as Taichung Shiyakusho, was constructed in 1911, when Taiwan was under Japanese rule. It has been turned into a cultural center since 2016. The current Taichung City Hall was completed and opened on 10 October 2010.

== Organizations ==
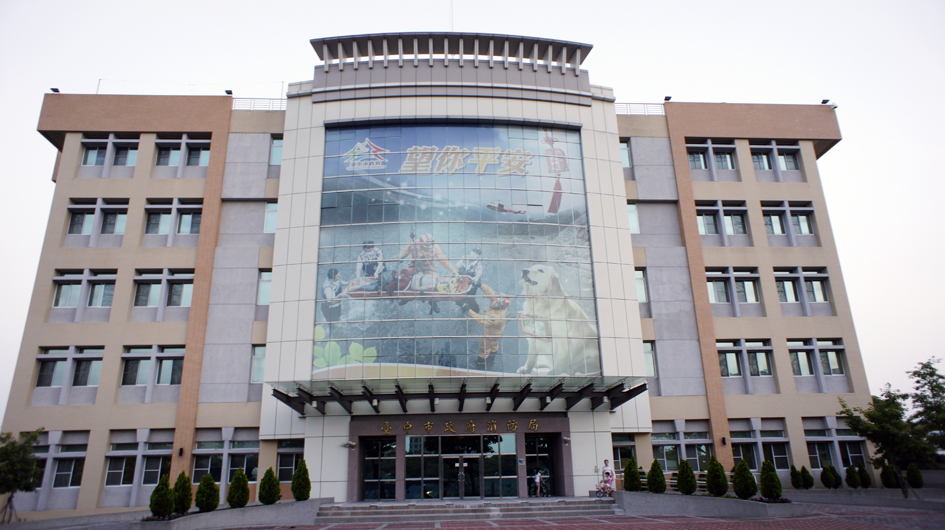
City Fire Bureau

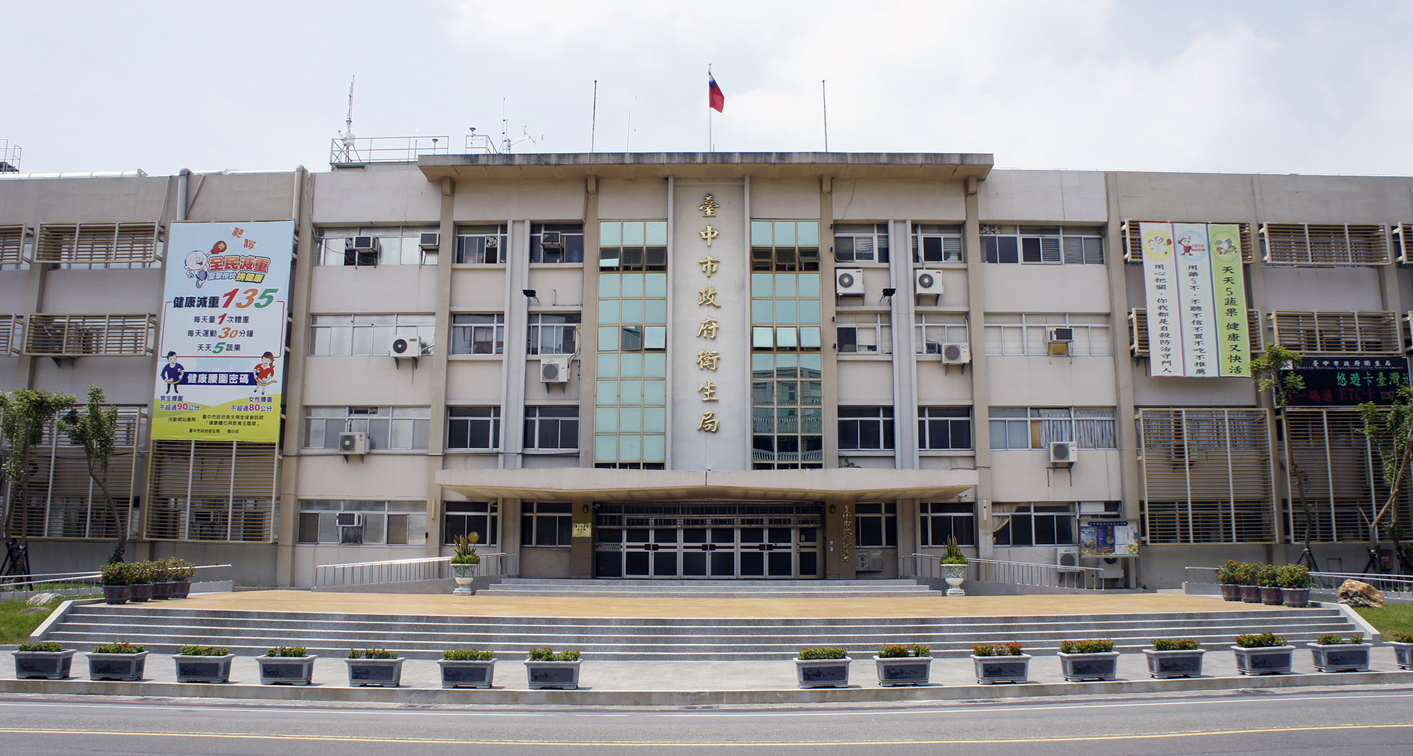
City Health Bureau

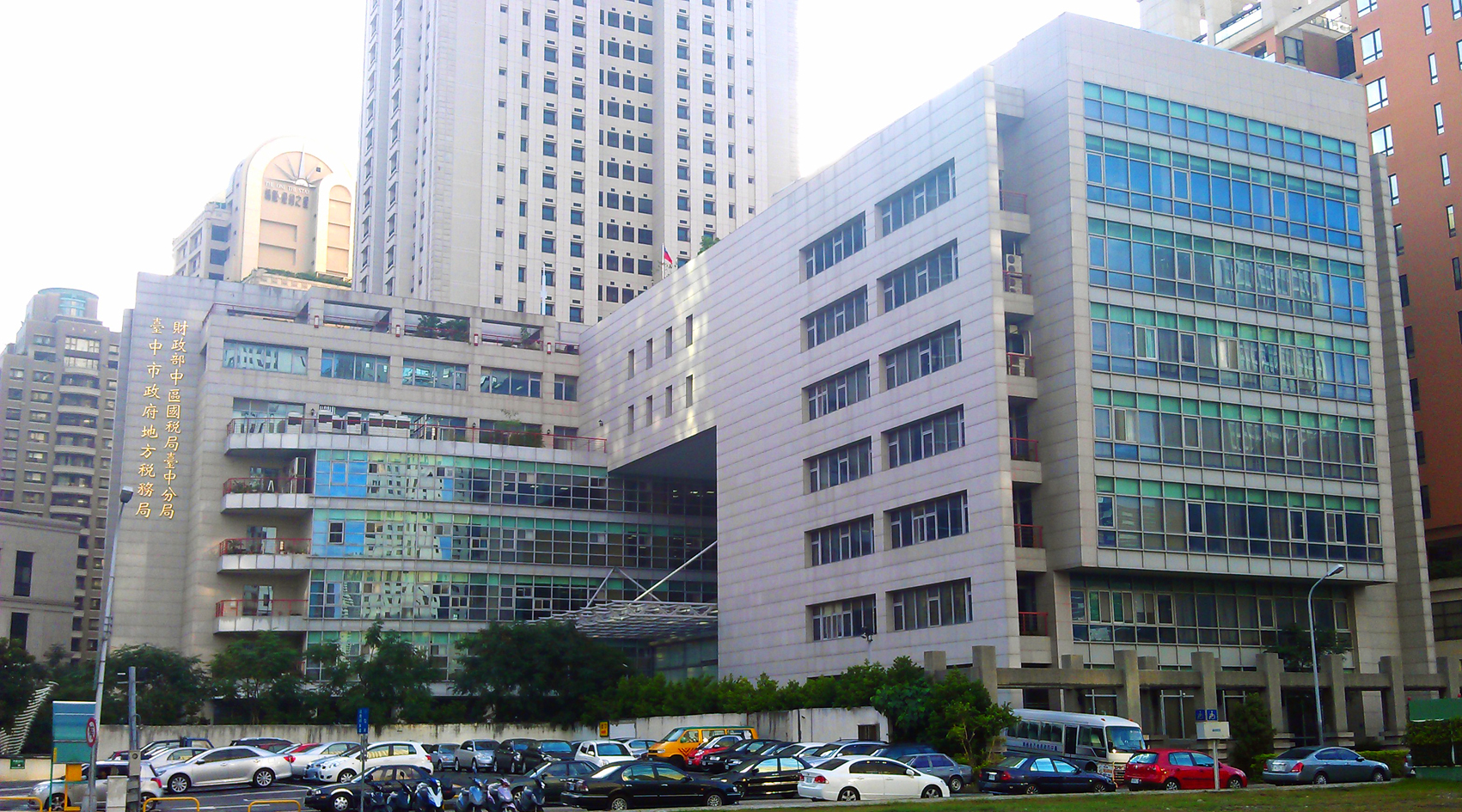
Local Tax Bureau

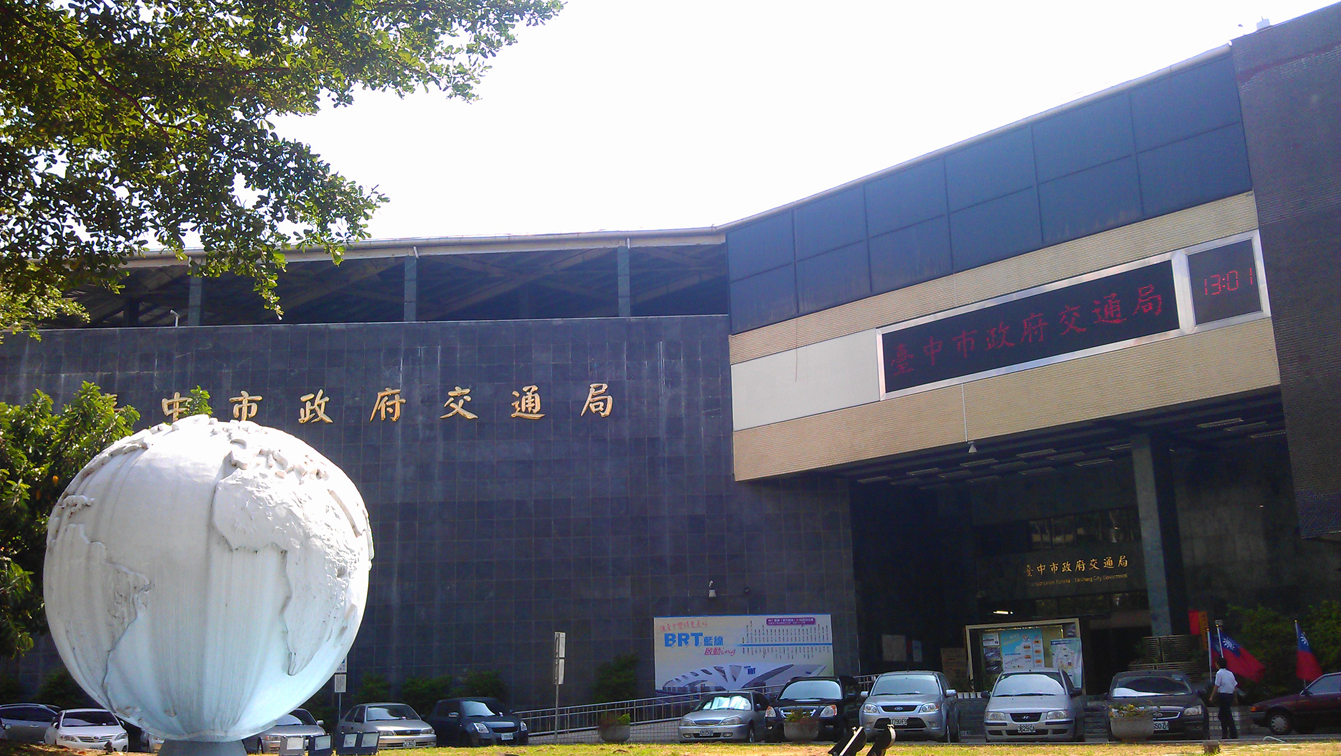
Transportation Bureau

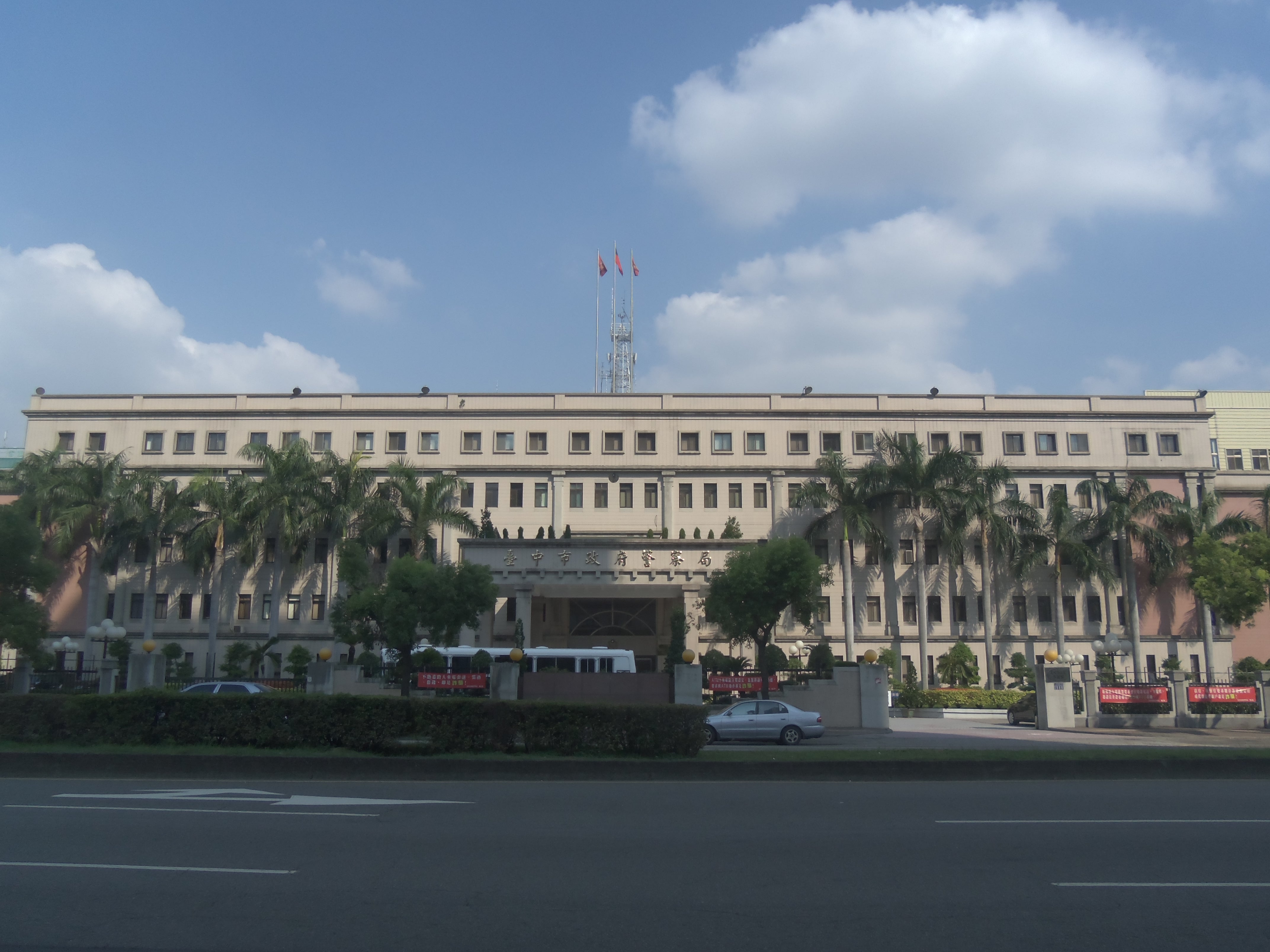
Taichung Police Department

=== Bureaus ===
- Agriculture Bureau
- Civil Affairs Bureau
- Construction Bureau
- Cultural Affairs Bureau
- Economic Development Bureau
- Education Bureau
- Environmental Protection Bureau
- Finance Bureau
- Fire Bureau
- Health Bureau
- Information Bureau
- Labor Affairs Bureau
- Land Administration Bureau
- Legal Affairs Bureau
- Local Tax Bureau
- Social Affairs Bureau
- Tourism and Travel Bureau
- Transportation Bureau
- Urban Development Bureau
- Water Resources Bureau

=== Offices ===
- Budget, Accounting and Statistics Office
- Central District Household Registration Office
- Civil Service Ethics Office
- Civil Service Training Center
- Council for Hakka Affairs
- Daya District Office
- Department of Personnel
- Indigenous People Commission
- Information Management Center
- Police Department
- Research, Development and Evaluation Commission
- Secretariat

== See also ==
- Taichung City Council
