= List of music festivals =

A list of music festivals around the world. A music festival is a festival oriented towards music that is sometimes presented with a theme such as musical genre, nationality or locality of musicians, or holiday. They are commonly held outdoors, and are often inclusive of other attractions such as food and merchandise vending, performance art, and social activities. The Pythian Games at Delphi included musical performances, and may be one of the earliest festivals known. During the Middle Ages festivals were often held as competitions.

== Related lists and categories ==
=== Lists by type ===
The following is a list of music festival lists by genre or type:

- List of classical music festivals
  - List of chamber music festivals
- List of early music festivals
- List of opera festivals
- List of folk festivals
  - List of country music festivals
  - List of maritime music festivals
  - List of Celtic culture festivals
  - List of bluegrass festivals
- List of jazz festivals
- List of Christian music festivals
- List of free festivals
- List of jam band music festivals
- List of heavy metal festivals
- List of reggae festivals
- List of hip-hop festivals
- List of electronic music festivals
  - List of electronic dance music festivals
  - List of technoparades

=== Categories by region ===
- Category:Music festivals by continent
- Category:Music festivals by country

=== Categories by type ===
- Category:Classical music festivals
  - Category:Chamber music festivals
  - Category:Choral festivals
  - Category:Contemporary classical music festivals
  - Category:Early music festivals
  - Category:Opera festivals
- Category:Electronic music festivals
  - Category:Electroacoustic music festivals
  - Category:Technoparade
  - Category:Trance festivals
- Category:Experimental music festivals
- Category:Hip-hop music festivals
- Category:Folk festivals
  - Category:Blues festivals
  - Category:Bluegrass festivals
  - Category:Celtic music festivals
    - Category:Eisteddfod
  - Category:Country music festivals
  - Category:Old-time music festivals
- Category:Jazz festivals
- Category:Rock festivals
  - Category:Free festivals
  - Category:Goth festivals
  - Category:Reggae festivals
  - Category:Heavy metal festivals
- Category:World music festivals

== Festivals by region ==
=== Africa ===
==== Angola ====
- Luanda International Jazz Festival, Luanda (2009–present) Jazz

==== Democratic Republic of the Congo ====
- Zaire 74, Kinshasa (1974)

==== Egypt ====
- Cairo Congress of Arab Music, Cairo (1932)

==== Mali ====
- Festival au Désert (2001–2012)

==== Malawi ====
- Lake of Stars Music Festival, Lake Malawi (2004–present)

==== Morocco ====
- Gnaoua World Music Festival, Essaouira
- Mawazine, Rabat (2001–present)
- Tanjazz, Tangier (2000–present) Jazz
- World Sacred Music Festival, Fes (1994–present)

==== Nigeria ====
- The Experience, Lagos (2006–present) Gospel
- Felabration, Lagos (1998–present) Afrobeat
- Gidi Culture Festival, Lagos (2014–present)
- Lagos International Jazz Festival, Lagos (2008–present) Jazz
- Star Mega Jam, Lagos & Abuja (2000–2010)

==== South Africa ====
- Cape Town International Jazz Festival, Cape Town (2000–present) Jazz
- Aardklop Festival, Potchefstroom
- In the City, Johannesburg (2012–present)
- Little Hearts Festival, Cape Town (2008)
- National Youth Jazz Festival, Grahamstown (1974–present) Jazz
- Oppikoppi, Northam (1994–present)
- RAMFest (2007–2014)
- Splashy Fen, Underberg (1990–present)
- Ultra South Africa, Cape Town & Johannesburg (2014–present)
- World Peace Party, Cape Town (1991) Warehouse rave

==== Tanzania ====
- Sauti za Busara, Zanzibar

==== Tunisia ====
- Festival international de musique symphonique d'El Jem, El Jem (1985–present) Symphonic music
- Hammamet International Festival, Hammamet
- International Festival of Carthage, Carthage (1964–present)
- Tabarka Jazz Festival, Tabarka (1973–1976, 1997–present)

==== Uganda ====
- Milege Festival, Entebbe (2010–present)
- Pearl Rhythm Festival, Kampala (2012–present)

=== Asia ===
- ABU Radio Song Festival
- ABU TV Song Festival

==== China ====
- Beijing Pop Festival, Beijing
- Midi Modern Music Festival, Beijing
- Modern Sky Festival, Beijing

==== Hong Kong ====
- Clockenflap, Hong Kong

==== India ====
- The Great Indian October Fest, Bangalore
- Music in the Hills, Jodhpur
- Sunburn Festival, Goa
- Hornbill Festival, Kohima
- Mood Indigo, IIT Bombay, Mumbai
- NH7 Weekender, Pune
- Rock Ethos, Bangalore
- Rock 'n India, Bangalore
- Ruhaniyat – The All India Sufi & Mystic Music Festival, Mumbai-Delhi-Kolkata-Bangalore-Hyderabad-Chennai-Pune
- Saarang (IIT Madras), Chennai
- Enchanted Valley Carnival, Pune

==== Indonesia ====
===== Active =====
- Djakarta Warehouse Project
- Hammersonic Festival
- Jakarta International Java Jazz Festival
- Jazz Goes To Campus
- Joyland Festival
- LaLaLa Fest
- North Sumatra Jazz Festival
- Rock In Solo
- Scream Or Dance
- We The Fest

===== Defunct =====
- Bestival Bali
- Java Rockin'land
- Java Soulnation
- Java Soundsfair
- Sunny Side Up Tropical Festival
- Ultra Bali

==== Lebanon ====
- Beirut Nights, Beirut

==== Malaysia ====
- Future Music Festival Asia, Kuala Lumpur
- Rainforest World Music Festival, Kuching

==== Nepal ====
- Goon lā
- Fête de la Musique, Kathmandu
- Himalayan Blues Festival, Kathmandu
- Jazzmandu, Kathmandu

==== Philippines ====
- 7107 International Music Festival, Clark, Pampanga
- Sinulog Festival, Cebu City
- Dinagyang Festival, Iloilo City
- Ati-Atihan Festival, Kalibo
- LaLaLa Fest, Greater Manila Area
- MassKara Festival, Bacolod
- Pulp Summer Slam, Manila
- Wanderland Music and Arts Festival, Muntinlupa

==== Singapore ====
- Baybeats, Singapore
- Mosaic Music Festival, Singapore
- Singfest, Singapore
- St Jerome's Laneway Festival, Singapore
- ZoukOut, Singapore

==== Sri Lanka ====
- Fête de la Musique, Sri Lanka
- SAGA, Sri Lanka

==== Taiwan ====
- Amis Music Festival, Taitung County
- Beigang International Music Festival, Beigang
- Hohaiyan Rock Festival, Gongliao
- Spring Scream, Kenting
- Taroko Music Festival, Hualien County

==== Thailand ====
- Maho Rasop Festival, Bangkok

==== United Arab Emirates ====
- Dubai Desert Rock Festival, Dubai

==== Vietnam ====
- Coca-Cola SoundFest, Ho Chi Minh City

=== Europe ===
- Eurovision Song Contest
- Junior Eurovision Song Contest
- Türkvizyon Song Contest
- Tuborg GreenFest

==== Austria ====
- Donaufestival, Krems an der Donau
- Donauinselfest, Vienna
- Frequency Festival, Sankt Pölten
- Nova Rock, Nickelsdorf
- Snowbombing, Mayrhofen
- Wien Modern

==== Belgium ====
- 10 Days Off, Ghent
- Ars Musica, Brussels
- Couleur Café, Brussels
- Dour Festival, Dour
- Folk Dranouter, Dranouter
- Gentse Feesten, Ghent
- Graspop Metal Meeting, Dessel
- Groezrock, Meerhout
- I Love Techno, Ghent
- Jazz Middelheim, Antwerp
- Les Ardentes, Liège
- Marktrock, Leuven
- Na fir bolg, Vorselaar
- Pukkelpop, Hasselt
- Reggae Geel, Geel
- Rock Werchter, Werchter
- Tomorrowland, Boom

==== Bulgaria ====
- Kavarna Rock Fest, Kavarna
- March Music Days, Ruse
- Spirit of Burgas, Burgas

==== Croatia ====
- The Garden Festival, Tisno, Zadar
- Hartera, Rijeka
- Hideout festival, Island of Pag
- INmusic festival, Zagreb
- Metalfest Croatia, Zadar
- Outlook festival, Pula
- Ultra Europe, Split & Hvar

==== Cyprus ====
- Reggae Sunjam

==== Czech Republic ====
- Brutal Assault, Jaroměř
- Colours of Ostrava, Ostrava
- Czechtalent Zlín, Zlín
- CzechTek
- The International Music Festival of F. L. Vek, Dobruška
- Masters of Rock, Vizovice
- Metalfest, Plzeň
- Mighty Sounds, Tábor
- Prague Spring International Music Festival, Prague
- Rock for People, Hradec Králové
- Trutnov Open Air Music Festival, Trutnov

==== Denmark ====
- Copenhagen Distortion, Copenhagen
- Copenhagen Jazz Festival, Copenhagen
- Copenhell, Copenhagen
- Midtfyns Festival, Ringe
- NorthSide Festival, Århus
- Roskilde festival, Roskilde
- Skanderborg Festival, Skanderborg
- SPOT, Århus
- Tinderbox, Odense
- Tønder Festival, Tønder

==== Finland ====
- Ankkarock, Vantaa
- DBTL, Turku
- Finnish Metal Expo, Helsinki
- Ilosaarirock, Joensuu
- Jalometalli Metal Music Festival, Oulu
- Kaustinen Folk Music Festival, Kaustinen
- Maata Näkyvissä, Turku
- Pori Jazz, Pori
- Provinssirock, Seinäjoki
- Ruisrock, Turku
- Sauna Open Air Metal Festival, Tampere
- Savonlinna Opera Festival, Savonlinna
- Tuska Open Air Metal Festival, Helsinki
- Weekend Festival, Helsinki

==== France ====
- Aix-en-Provence Festival, Aix-en-Provence
- Eurockéennes, Belfort
- Festival Interceltique de Lorient, Lorient
- Hellfest Summer Open Air, Clisson
- La Route du Rock, Saint-Malo
- Lollapalooza Paris, Paris
- Main Square Festival, Arras
- Musicalta Festival, Rouffach
- Musilac, Aix-les-bains
- Printemps de Bourges, Bourges
- Rock En Seine, Saint-Cloud
- Soy Festival, Nantes
- Vieilles Charrues Festival, Carhaix
- Villette Sonique, Paris

==== Germany ====
- Airbeat One, Neustadt-Glewe
- Berlin Festival, Berlin
- Das Fest, Karlsruhe
- Fusion Festival, Lärz
- Haldern Pop, Haldern
- Hurricane Festival, Scheeßel
- JazzFest Berlin, Berlin
- Lollapalooza Berlin, Berlin
- Mayday, Dortmund
- M'era Luna Festival, Hildesheim
- Melt! Festival, Gräfenhainichen
- Nature One, Kastellaun
- Neubrandenburg, Neubrandenburg
- Rock am Ring and Rock im Park
- Splash, Ferropolis, Gräfenhainichen
- SonneMondSterne, Bleilochtalsperre
- Southside Festival, Tuttlingen
- Summer Breeze Open Air, Dinkelsbühl
- Summerjam, Köln
- Wacken Open Air, Wacken
- Wave-Gotik-Treffen

==== Greece ====
- Rockwave Festival, Malakasa
- Plisskën Festival, Athens

==== Hungary ====
- Balaton Sound, Zamárdi, Lake Balaton
- Miskolc Opera Festival, Miskolc
- Ozora Festival Psychedelic Tribal Gathering, Ozora
- Sziget Festival, Budapest

==== Iceland ====
- Eistnaflug, Neskaupstaður
- Iceland Airwaves, Reykjavík
- Þjóðhátíð, Heimaey

==== Ireland ====
- All Together Now, Portlaw (2018–present)
- Beyond the Pale, Glendalough (2022–present)
- Body&Soul, Westmeath (2009–present)
- Castlepalooza, Tullamore (2005–2018)
- Cois Fharraige, Kilkee (2007–2009)
- KnockanStockan, Blessington (2007–2019)
- Konnect Festival, Tramore (2018–2019)
- Cork Jazz Festival, Cork City (1978–present)
- Electric Picnic, Stradbally (2004–present)
- Fuinneamh, Louth (2018–present)
- Forbidden Fruit (2011–present)
- Forrest Fest, Laois (2023–present)
- Garden Party, Athboy (2006–2007)
- Harvest Time Blues, Monaghan (1990–2001, 2007–present)
- In The Meadows, Kilmainham (2023–present)
- Indiependence, Mitchelstown (2006–2023)
- Life Festival, Mullingar (2006–2024)
- Blackwater Valley Opera Festival, Waterford (2010–present)
- Live at the Marquee, Cork (2005–2019, 2022–present)
- Longitude Festival, Dublin (2013–present)
- Midlands, Mullingar (2009–2010)
- Oxegen, Naas (2004–2011, 2013)
- Sea Sessions, Bundoran
- Slane Concert, Slane Castle (1981–present)
- TradFest, Temple Bar (2006–present)

==== Latvia ====
- Latvian Song and Dance Festival, Riga (~100 000 visitors, takes place once in five years)
- Positivus Festival, Salacgrīva (46 000 visitors)
- Saulkrasti Jazz Festival, Saulkrasti

==== Lithuania ====
- Kaziuko mugė, Vilnius
- Kilkim Žaibu, Varniai
- Tundra, Zarasai

==== Luxembourg ====
- Rock um Knuedler, Luxembourg
- Open Air Field, Lintgen

==== Malta ====
- Festival Internazzjonali tal-Kanzunetta Maltija (1960–2013)
- L-Għanja tal-Poplu
- Malta Jazz Festival (1990–present)
- Malta Song for Europe (known also as Malta Eurovision)

==== Montenegro ====
- Sea Dance Festival, Buljarica

==== Netherlands ====
- 5 Days Off, Amsterdam
- Afrika Festival Hertme
- Arrow Rock Festival, Biddinghuizen
- Awakenings, Spaarnwoude
- Defqon.1 Festival, Biddinghuizen
- Down the Rabbit Hole
- Incubate, Tilburg
- Le Guess Who?, Utrecht
- Liquicity, Amsterdam
- Lowlands, Biddinghuizen
- Masters of Hardcore, Den Bosch
- Mysteryland, Haarlemmermeer
- North Sea Jazz Festival, The Hague
- Parkpop, The Hague
- Pinkpop Festival, Landgraaf
- Qlimax, Arnhem
- Sensation, Amsterdam
- State-X, The Hague
- WOO HAH!, Tilburg
- Valkhof Festival (formerly known as de-Affaire), Nijmegen
- Vierdaagse, Nijmegen
- Zwarte Cross, Lichtenvoorde

==== North Macedonia ====
- Ohrid Fest, Ohrid
- Ohrid summer Festival, Ohrid
- Skopje Fest
- Skopje Jazz Festival

==== Norway ====
- AnJazz, Hamar
- Balejazz, Balestrand
- Bergenfest, Bergen
- Bodø Jazz Open, Bodø
- Borealis Festival, Bergen
- By:Larm, Oslo
- Bukta Tromsø Open Air Festival, Tromsø
- Canal Street, Arendal
- DølaJazz, Lillehammer
- Festspillene i Bergen, Bergen
- Hardanger Musikkfest, Hardanger
- Hole in the Sky, Bergen
- Hove Festival, Tromøya
- Ice Music Festival, Geilo
- Inferno Metal Festival, Oslo
- Kongsberg Jazzfestival, Kongsberg
- MaiJazz, Stavanger
- Moldejazz, Molde
- Narvik Winter Festival, Narvik
- Nattjazz, Bergen
- Nordlysfestivalen, Tromsø
- Norwegian Wood, Oslo
- Notodden Blues Festival, Notodden
- Oslo Jazzfestival, Oslo
- Oslo Operaball, Oslo
- Parkenfestivalen, Bodø
- Polarjazz, Longyearbyen
- Punktfestivalen, Kristiansand
- Risør kammermusikkfest, Risør
- Quart Festival, Kristiansand
- Sildajazz, Haugesund
- Stavernfestivalen, Stavern
- Storåsfestivalen, Meldal
- Tons of Rock, Oslo
- Tromsø Jazz Festival, Tromsø
- Vossajazz, Vossevangen
- Øyafestivalen, Oslo

==== Poland ====
- Coke Live Music Festival, Kraków
- Creamfields, Wrocław
- Mayday, Katowice
- Metalmania, Katowice
- National Festival of Polish Song, Opole
- Off Festival, Katowice
- Open'er Festival, Gdynia
- Orange Warsaw Festival, Warsaw
- Piknik Country, Mrągowo
- Sonisphere Festival, Warsaw
- Sopot International Song Festival, Sopot
- Unsound Festival, Kraków
- Pol'and'Rock Festival, Kostrzyn nad Odrą

==== Portugal ====
- Boom Festival, Idanha-a-Nova
- Festival de Vilar de Mouros, Vilar de Mouros
- Optimus Alive!, Lisbon
- Optimus Primavera Sound, Porto
- Rock in Rio, Lisbon
- Sudoeste Festival, Zambujeira do Mar
- Super Bock Super Rock, Meco
- Vagos Open Air, Vagos
- Vodafone Paredes de Coura, Paredes de Coura

==== Russia ====
- Afisha Picnic, Moscow
- Empty Hills, Kaluga Oblast
- InProg, Moscow
- Intervision Song Contest
- Maxidrom, Moscow
- Nashestvie, Moscow Oblast
- Park Live Festival, Moscow
- Systo Palty, Leningrad Oblast

==== Serbia ====
- Arsenal Fest, Kragujevac
- Belgrade Beer Fest, Belgrade
- EXIT, Novi Sad
- Gitarijada Rock Festival, Zaječar
- Guča trumpet festival, Guča
- Nišville Jazz Festival, Niš

==== Slovakia ====
- Bratislava Music Festival, Bratislava
- Grape music festival, Piešťany
- Košice Music Spring Festival, Košice
- Pohoda, Trenčín

==== Slovenia ====
- Metaldays, Tolmin
- Lent Festival, Maribor

==== Spain ====
- Benicàssim
- Bilbao Live Festival, Bilbao
- Boombastic Festival
- Creamfields Andalucía, El Ejido
- Festival Internacional de Benicàssim, Benicàssim, Castelló
- Interceltic Festival of Avilés, Asturias
- Mad Cool, Madrid
- Monegros, Desierto de los Monegros, Huesca
- Primavera Sound, Barcelona
- Rock in Rio, Madrid
- Sónar, Barcelona
- Sonorama, Aranda de Duero, Burgos
- Summercase, Madrid and Barcelona
- Telecogresca, Barcelona

==== Sweden ====
- Arvika Festival, Värmland
- Bråvalla festival, Norrköping
- Hultsfred Festival, Småland
- Knarrholmen
- Lollapalooza Stockholm, Stockholm
- Metaltown Festival, Gothenburg
- Peace & Love, Borlänge
- Siesta!, Hässleholm
- Storsjöyran, Östersund
- Sweden Rock Festival, Norje
- Umeå Jazz Festival, Umeå
- Uppsala Reggae Festival, Uppsala
- Way Out West, Gothenburg
- Where the Action Is, Stockholm

==== Switzerland ====
- Avo Session Basel, Basel
- Caribana Festival, Crans
- Greenfield Festival, Interlaken
- Gurtenfestival, Bern
- Montreux Jazz Festival, Montreux
- Nox Illuminata, Basel
- Paléo Festival, Nyon
- Verbier Festival, Verbier

==== Turkey ====
- Ankara International Music Festival
- Istanbul International Jazz Festival, Istanbul
- Istanbul International Music Festival, Istanbul
- İzmir European Jazz Festival, İzmir
- Mersin International Music Festival, Mersin
- Neon International Psychedelic Music & Art Festival, Bursa
- Rock'n Coke, Istanbul
- RockIstanbul, Istanbul
- Sonisphere Festival, Istanbul

==== Ukraine ====
- Atlas Weekend, Kyiv
- Chervona Ruta
- Global Gathering, Kyiv
- Crimea Music Fest, Yalta
- Gogolfest, Kyiv
- Kazantip, Popovka
- Koktebel Jazz Festival, Zatoka
- Kyiv Music Fest, Kyiv
- LvivMozArt, Lviv
- Stare Misto, Lviv
- Trypilske kolo, Rzhyshchiv
- Two Days and Two Nights of New Music, Odesa
- Zaxidfest, Lviv

=== North America ===
==== Dominican Republic ====
- Festival Presidente de la Musica Latina, Santo Domingo

==== Haiti ====
- Port-au-Prince International Jazz Festival

==== Mexico ====
- Baja Beach Fest
- Corona Capital, Mexico City and Guadalajara
- Cosquin Rock, Guadalajara
- Electric Daisy Carnival, Mexico City
- Machaca Fest, Monterrey
- MUTEK, Mexico City
- Pal Norte, Monterrey
- Vive Latino, Mexico City

=== South America ===
==== Argentina ====
- Cosquin Rock, Cosquín
- Creamfields BA, Buenos Aires
- Lollapalooza, San Isidro
- Monsters of Rock, Buenos Aires
- Pepsi Music Festival, Buenos Aires
- Personal fest, Buenos Aires
- Quilmes Rock, Quilmes

==== Bolivia ====
- Bach Festival, Cochabamba

==== Brazil ====
- Tomorrowland, Itu
- Lollapalooza, São Paulo
- Rock in Rio, Rio de Janeiro
- SWU Music & Arts, Paulínia

==== Chile ====
- Life in Color, Santiago
- Lollapalooza Chile, Santiago
- Maquinaria Festival, Santiago
- Mysteryland, Picarquín
- Sensation, Santiago
- Ultra Music Festival, Santiago or Viña del Mar
- Viña del Mar International Song Festival, Viña del Mar
- Rock in Rio, Santiago

==== Ecuador ====
- Quito Fest, Quito

== See also ==
- List of festivals
- Lists of festivals – festival list articles on Wikipedia
