= List of music festivals in Taiwan =

Music festivals of Taiwan
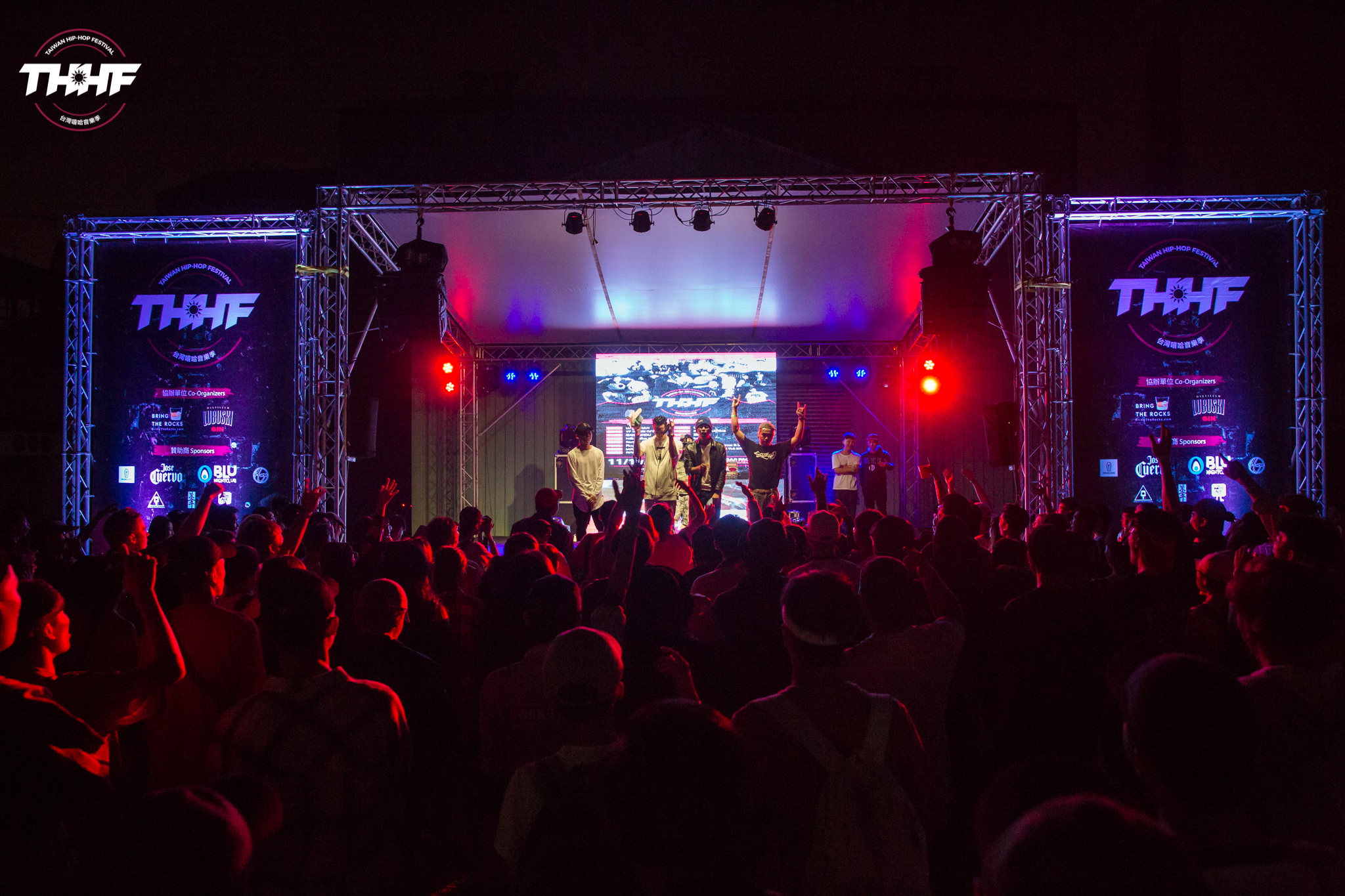
- 2017 Taiwan Hip Hop Festival in Kaohsiung

General Information
- Related genres: Mandopop, Hokkien pop, rock music, Indigenous music, etc.
- Location: Taiwan

The following is a list of music festivals in Taiwan. This list may have overlap with list of music festivals and List of festivals in Taiwan. Music festivals in Taiwan may focus on Taiwanese musicians or international musicians, and may be either in a concert or music competition format, or both. Music of Taiwan in contemporary times incorporates diverse genres, and Taiwan has many ongoing music festivals dedicated to pop music, Indigenous music, Indie Music, as well as Mandopop.

== Festivals ==
Festival name	Type	City/venue	Years	Notes
Amis Music Festival	Indigenous music	Dulan Village, Taitung County	2013–present	Organized by Suming Rupi
Beigang International Music Festival	Light music	Beigang, Yunlin	2006–present	The festival has a series of concerts, mostly wind music, and an educational program within the Chia-Hu Conservatory
Fireball Fest.	Indie Music, Rock Music	Rakuten Taoyuan Baseball Stadium, Taoyuan	2017–present	The festival is initiated and produced by the band Fire EX..
Formoz Festival	Indie Music	Taipei	1995–present	Formoz Festival plays an important role in the development of Taiwanese indie music.
Hohaiyan Rock Festival	Rock Music	Fulong Beach, Gongliao District, New Taipei	2000–present	
Megaport Music Festival	Rock festival and Indie Music	Kaohsiung	2006–present	
Spring Scream	Music festival	Kenting, Pingtung County	1995–present	The festival showcases a variety of music styles from bands both from Taiwan and overseas.
Taichung Jazz Festival	Jazz festival	Taichung	2003–present	
Taroko Music Festival	Music festival	Taroko National Park, Xiulin Township, Hualien County	2002–present	

== Gallery ==
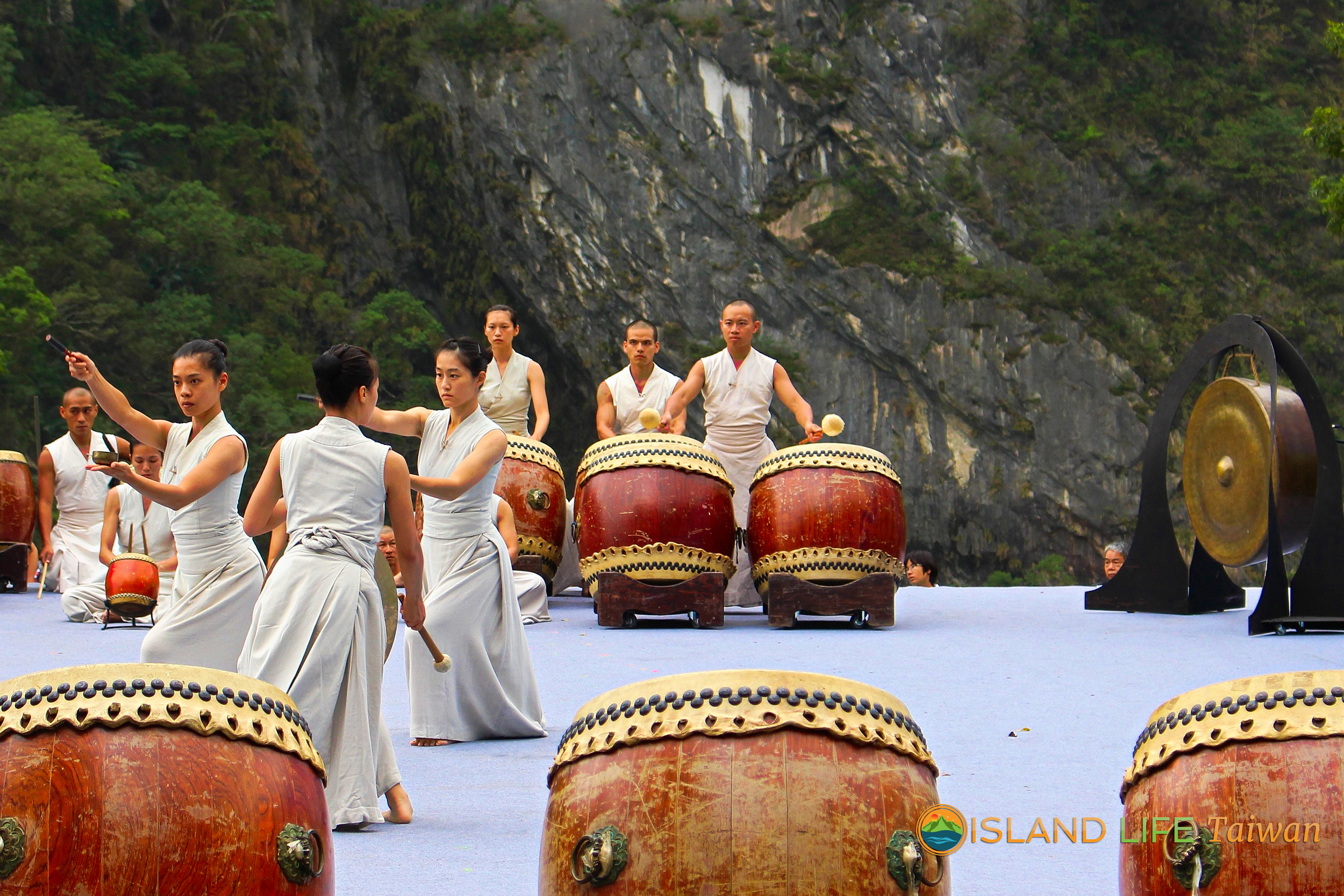
Taroko Music Festival 2017

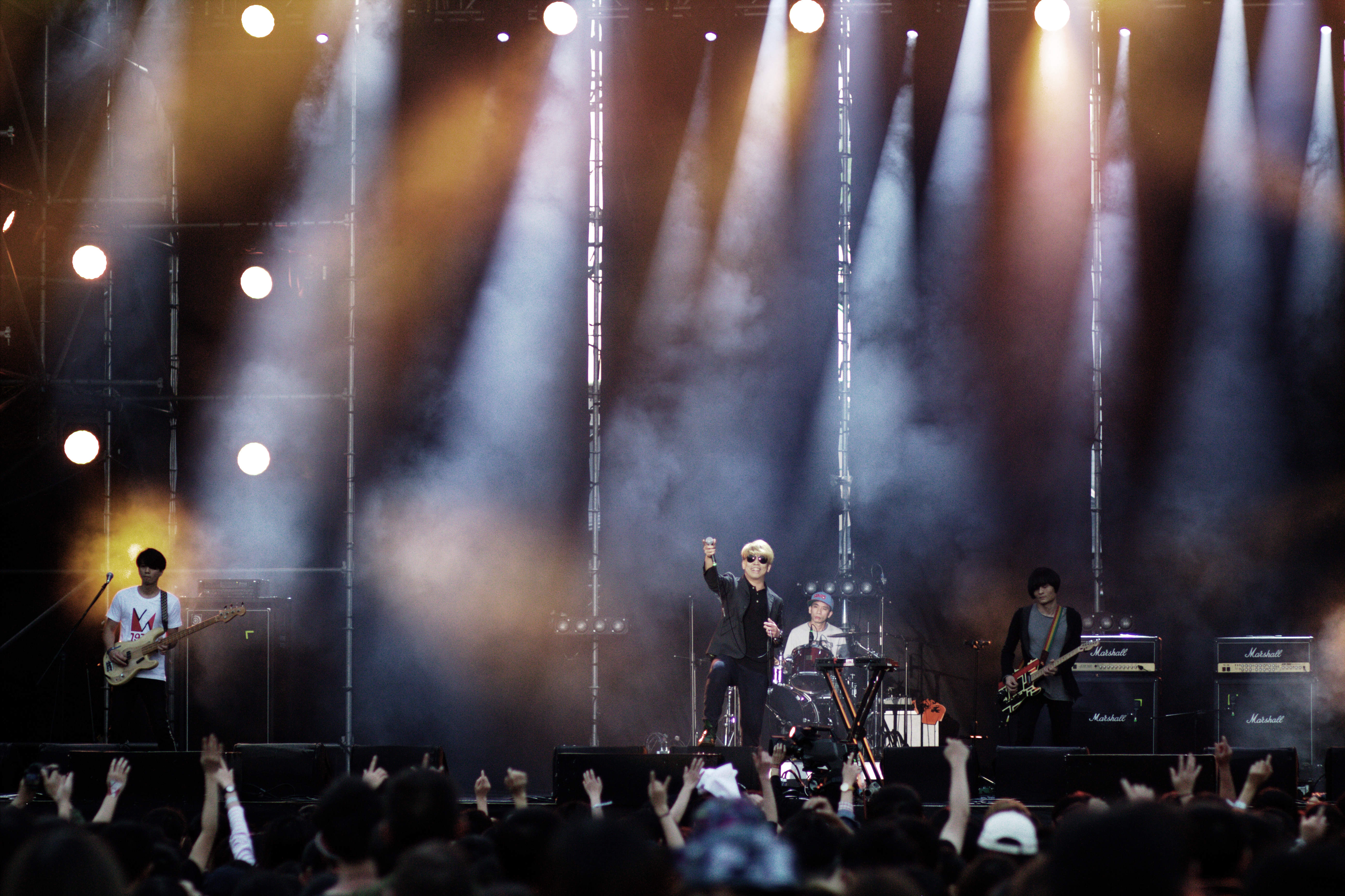
Megaport Music Festival 2016

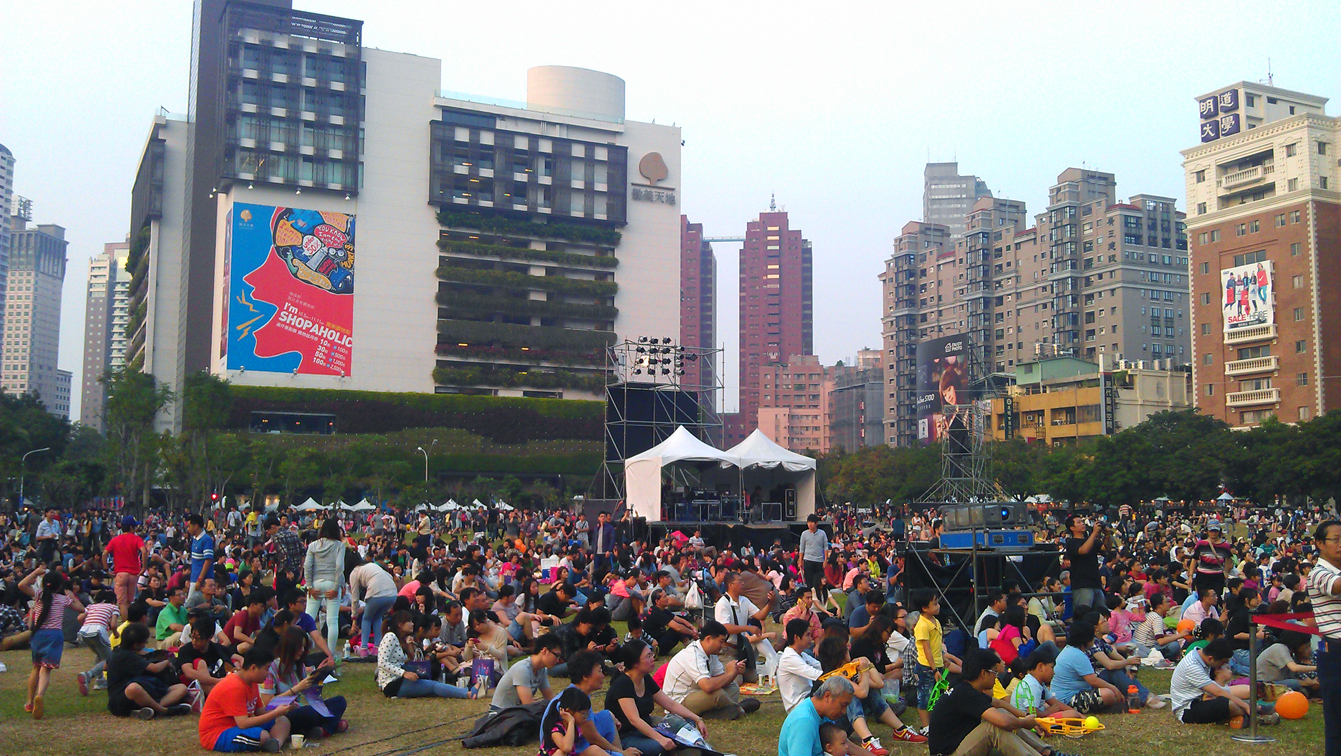
Taichung Jazz Festival 2012

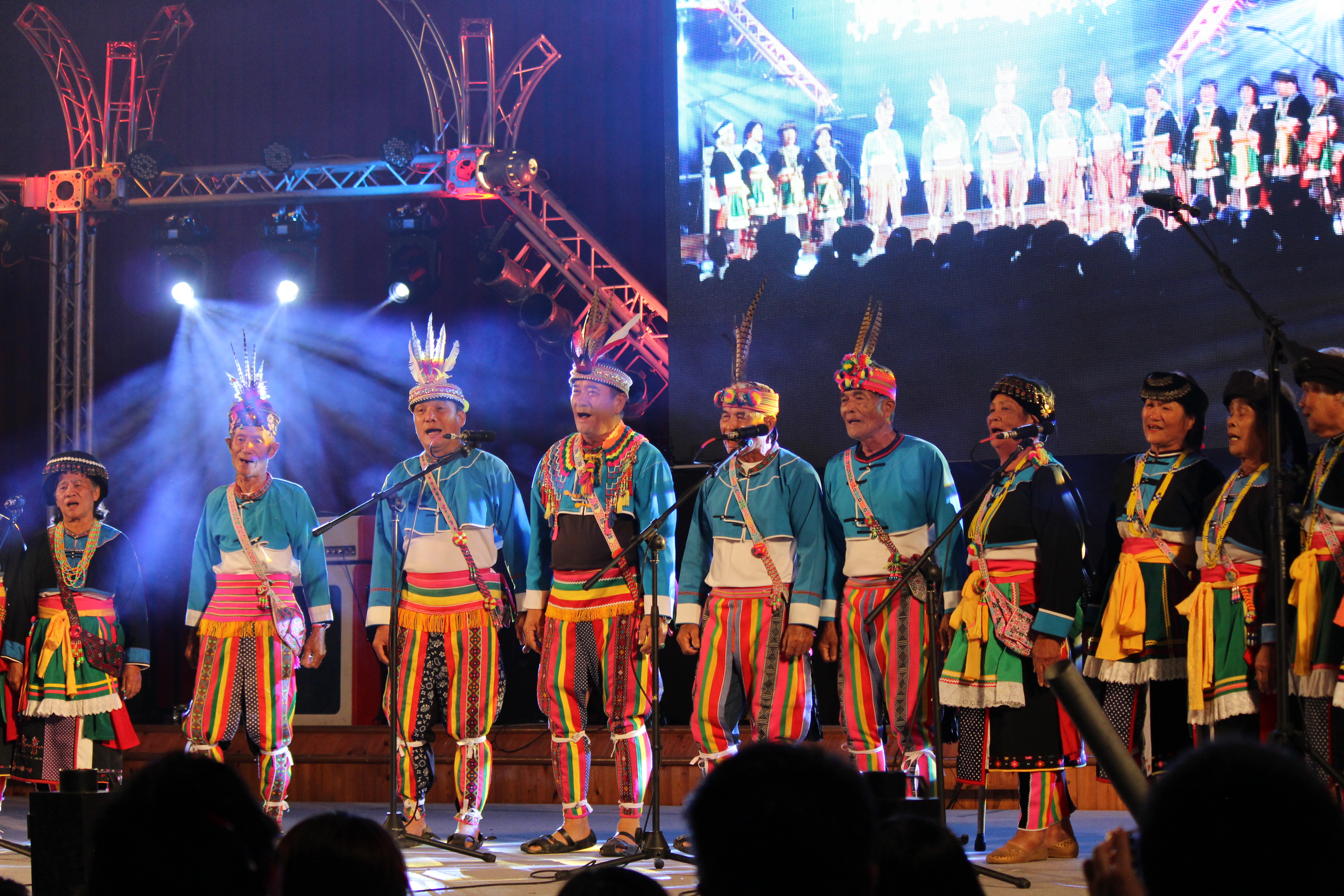
Amis Music Festival 2016

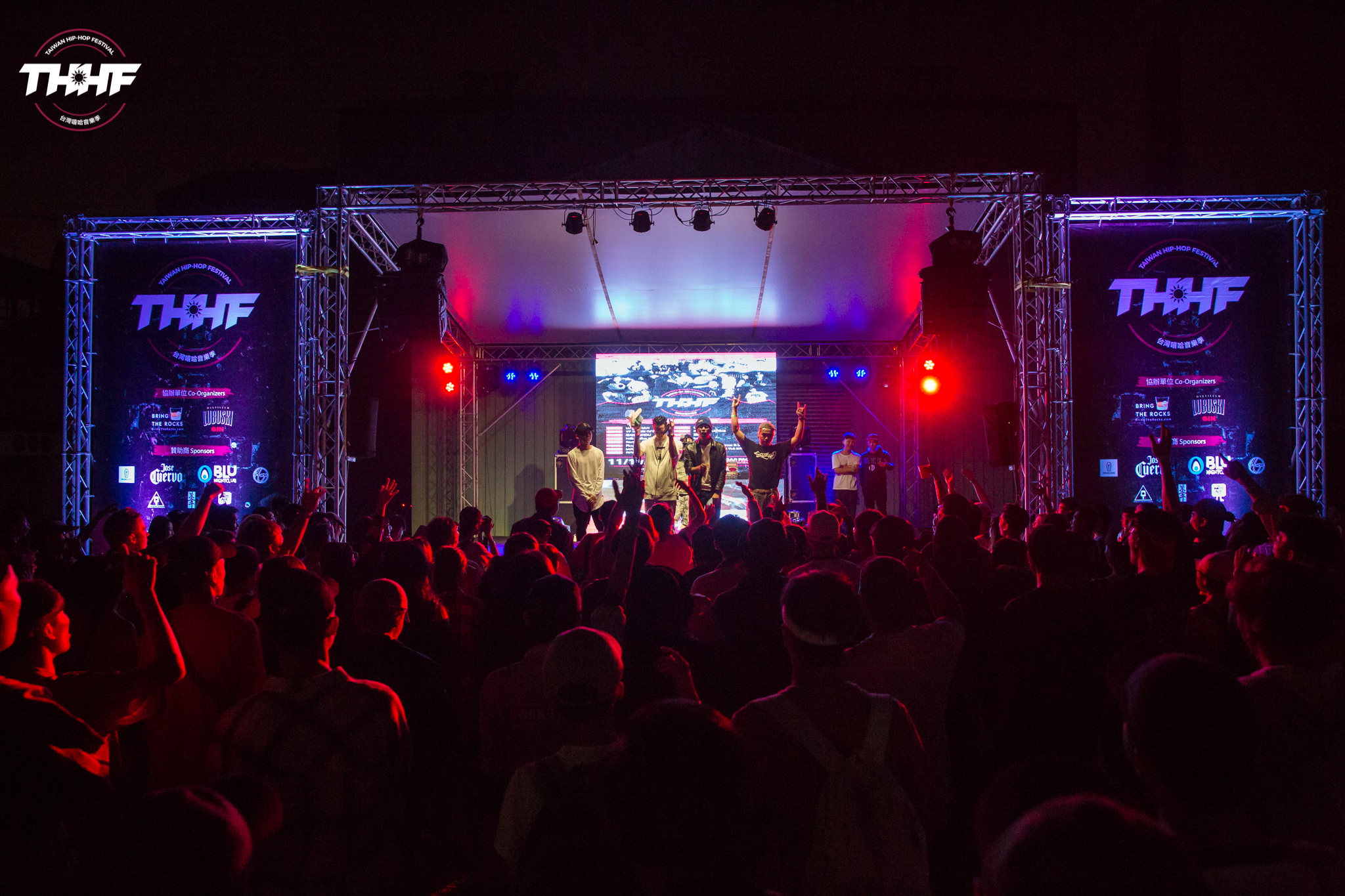
Taiwan Hip Hop Festival 2017

== See also ==
- Festivals of Taiwan
- List of music festivals#Taiwan
- Music of Taiwan
- List of film festivals in Taiwan
- List of tourist attractions in Taiwan
