= Coca-Cola SoundFest =

Music festival in Vietnam

Coca-Cola and Samsung Galaxy Y SoundFest
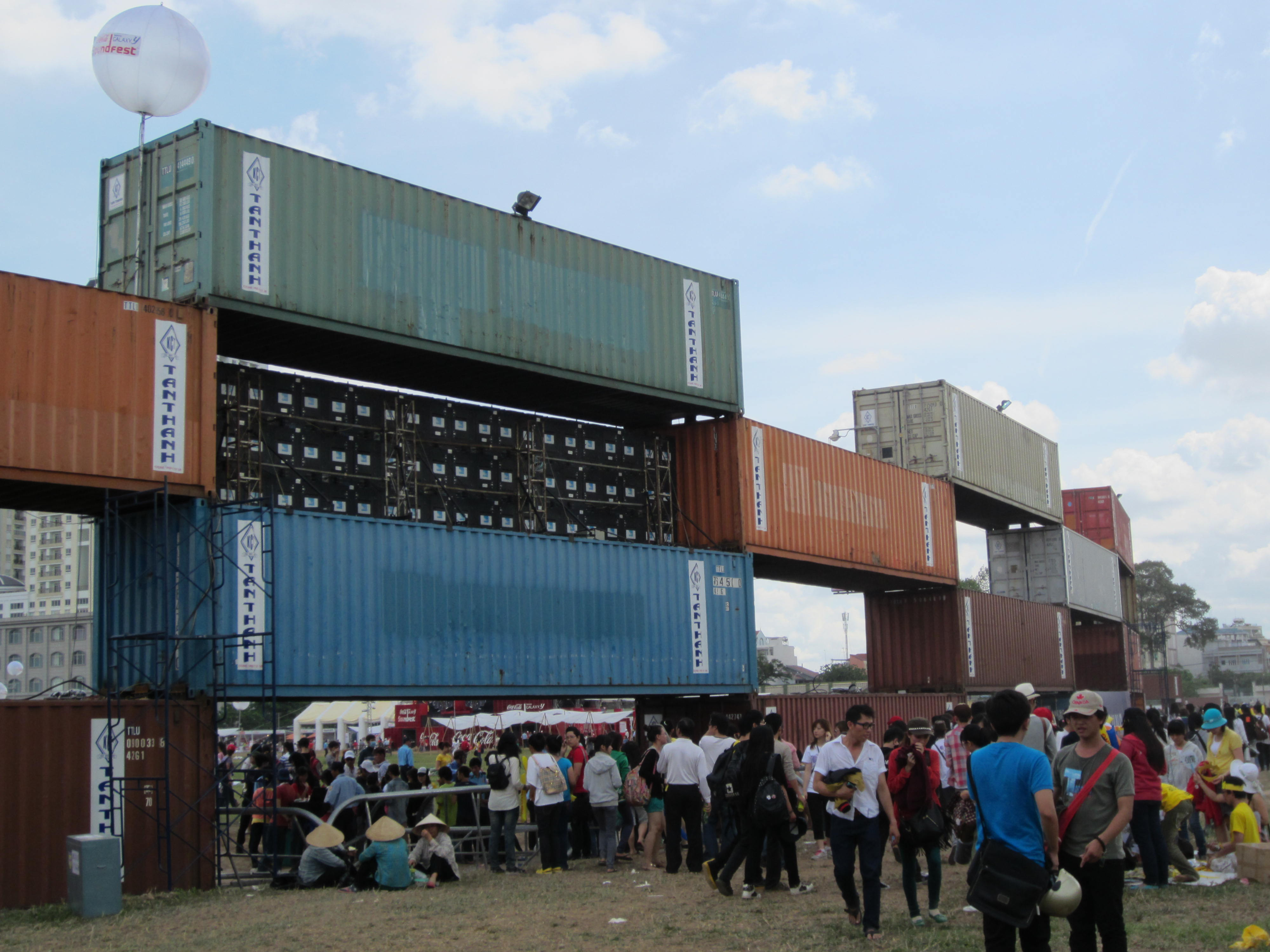
- SoundFest entrance
- Genre: Rock, pop, K-pop, Rap, R&B, Hip hop
- Dates: April 14, 2012
- Locations: Ho Chi Minh City, Vietnam
- Years active: 2012
- Website: Official SoundFest website

Coca-Cola and Samsung Galaxy Y SoundFest (referred as Coca-Cola SoundFest on the official website or SoundFest Vietnam on the official Facebook) is a music festival first held in Ho Chi Minh City, Vietnam, on April 14, 2012. SoundFest has been the largest music festival in Vietnam in terms of the line-up artists as well as the duration time. The 2012 event was sponsored by Coca-Cola and Samsung.

== 2012 ==
Information on this festival was first revealed in February 2012 by Coca-Cola. Big Bang and Tata Young were the first international artists to be included in the line-up besides the local bands and singers after Samsung sponsored with Coca-Cola. Later, it was revealed that BigBang was paid US$250,000 for 30 minutes at the event. On March 29, Taio Cruz and Kimberly Caldwell were added to the list to increase some more fans to make the event extremely successful, and Audi later joined as the official sponsor for the event. The event was held at Phu Tho Racing Field in Ho Chi Minh City, Vietnam, and the official organizer for this event was Saigon Sound System (after their first and successful Bob Dylan concert held on April 10, 2011 at RMIT). According to the hosts, there were 40,000 people attending SoundFest; however, Caldwell posted on her Facebook that there were 51,000 attenders. Despite there were some small controversies due to the fact several BigBang fans jostled and fainted before and during the BigBang performance at 8pm, including the exhaustion from waiting such under the hot weather for almost 4 hours (1pm-5pm), Soundfest received extremely positive reviews from several audiences, the critics, and the social media, and was an overwhelming success in terms of the first-ever large scale concert in Vietnam after CAMA and Loreto Fest (also Saigon Sound System) The song 'Wavin' Flag' was performed by Phương Vy as part of the interest ahead of the Barclays Premier League finals, UEFA Euro 2012, and the forthcoming London Olympics 2012.

=== Artists ===
(In performing order)

- Unlimited
- Tiến Đạt
- Bức Tường
- Microwave
- Thảo Trang
- Hà Okio
1. Sài Gòn Cafe Sữa Đá
2. Turn Your Lights Down Low
3. I'm Yours/ Where Is The Love
4. Nơi Ấy
5. Như Là Mơ (with N.P. Thùy Trang)
- Suboi
- Văn Mai Hương
- Minh Xù
- Phương Vy
- Antoneus Maximus
- PAK
- Big Bang
1. Tonight
2. Hands Up
3. Bad Boy
4. Fantastic Baby
5. Lies
6. Last Farewell
- Thanh Bui
1. Rolling in the Deep (Adele)
2. U & I
3. I'm Forbidden
4. Just the Way You Are (Bruno Mars) (with Tata Young)
- Tata Young
1. Just the Way You Are (Bruno Mars) (with Thanh Bui)
2. El Nin-YO!
3. I Believe
- Kimberly Caldwell
1. Desperate Girls & Stupid Boys
2. Stronger (Kelly Clarkson)
3. Mess of You
4. Need You Now (Lady Antebellum)
5. Say Love
6. Someone Like You (Adele)
7. We Are Young (fun.)
- Taio Cruz
1. Hangover
2. Break Your Heart
3. Come On Girl
4. Without You (David Guetta)
5. She's Like a Star
6. Little Bad Girl (David Guetta)
7. Troublemaker
8. Higher
9. Dirty Picture
10. Dynamite (Encore)

Executive Producer: Rod Quinton Show Director: Joshua Turner

=== Controversies ===
SoundFest started at 1PM when the temperature reached almost 40 degree Celsius and lasted for 9 hours, some attenders were exhausted and tired from waiting under such a heat. Pushing and jostling was another problem, especially when BigBang began their performance. Several fans fainted while many fans standing in the front row were pushed to the barriers, some were injured.. The organizer eventually had to pause the band's performance to warn the audience to stop pushing, or else the show would be cancelled. After BigBang's performance, many of the audience left despite the fact that there were still other acts to come.

=== Reviews ===
"Soundfest is the financial and critical success, calling the festival 'the new generation of music in 2012!"

== Future ==
It is unknown whether the 2013 event will be held. However, during the 2012 event, the hosts stated that if there were no serious accidents in SoundFest 2012, there might be SoundFest 2013. Kimberly Caldwell, DJ Ajam also expressed the anticipation for next year's SoundFest. Recently, Coca-Cola's Zing site as well as SoundFest Vietnam's official Facebook are asking fans which bands they want to perform at SoundFest 2013.
