= Without Regret =

Without Regret may refer to:

- Without Regret (film), a 1935 American film
- Without Regret (album), a 2011 album by Kimberly Caldwell
- (Without Regret.), a 2014 EP by British band Smash
