= Five Days Off =

Festival in the Netherlands

5 Days Off
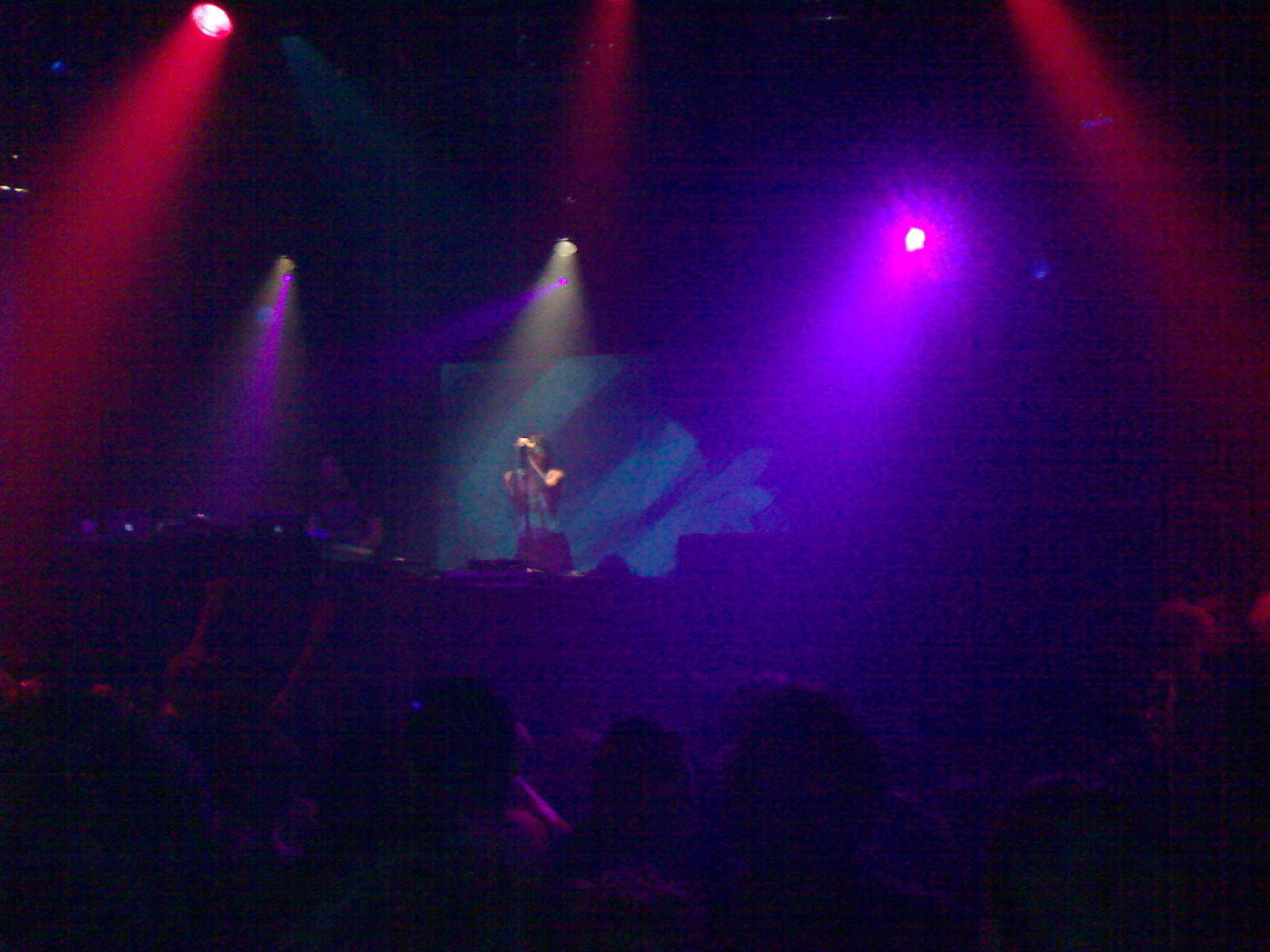
- Genre: EDM
- Locations: Amsterdam, Netherlands
- Years active: 2001-present
- Founders: Ten Days Off Festival

5 Days Off is a festival that includes music and cultural events in Amsterdam, Netherlands. It started in 2001 as spin-off of Ghent, Belgium's Ten Days Off Festival.

== History ==
10 Days Off began as 10 Days Of Techno in 1995. A couple of years later the name was changed to 5 Days Off and since then all genres of electronic music could be seen, heard and experienced at the festival.

5 Days Off is the first multi-day indoor dance event in the Netherlands. It has grown out of a fairly small festival in the Amsterdam Melkweg into a true citywide festival, which now also involves Paradiso and De Balie.

Nowadays, 5 Days Off is an important cultural meeting with a reputation reaching far across the borders, giving its young public five days of nightclubbing, live shows and performances. Since 2001, the organization puts together a program which contains a strong mix of acknowledged names and upcoming talents from the Netherlands and abroad. The organization is continuously following the latest developments within the ever-evolving music industry and club culture. The festival attracts more than twenty thousand visitors annually.

Five nights in a row, the best artists will be performing in the Melkweg and Paradiso. In the past, 5 Days Off has featured performances by Daft Punk, The Gaslamp Killer, Darkside, SBTRKT, Hudson Mohawke, Flying Lotus, Jeff Mills, Netsky, Dizzee Rascal and Monolake. Before the nighttime program kicks off, the festival presents an Art program in De Balie. This is a diverse side program that gives a platform to other art disciplines like film, photography, media art, graphic design, fashion, and lifestyle.

In 2015, 5 Days Off will celebrate its 15th birthday.

== See also ==
- List of electronic music festivals
