= Bratislava Music Festival =

Classical music festival in Bratislava, Slovakia

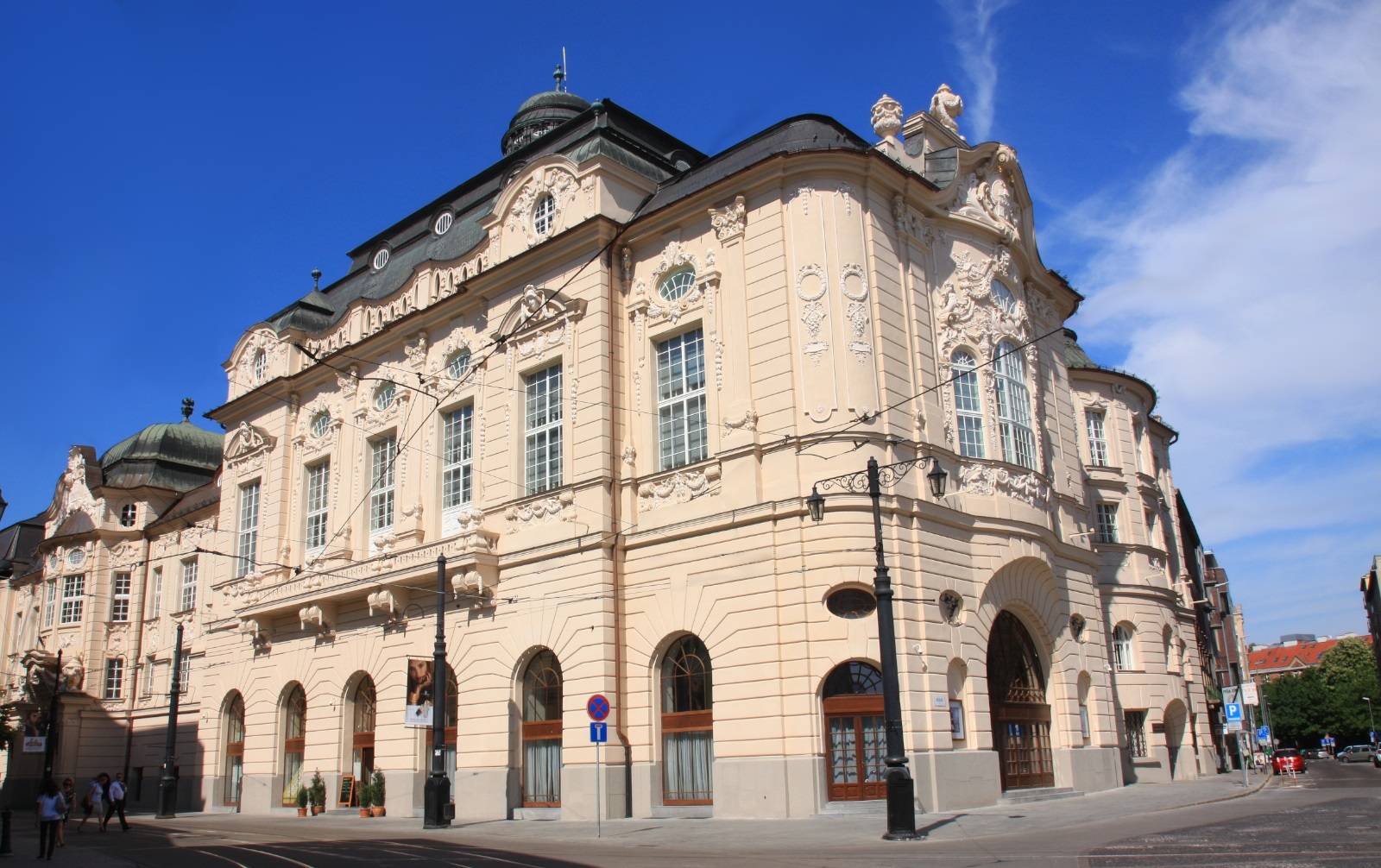
Slovak Philharmonic (National Philharmonic) building (2014)

The Bratislava Music Festival (Bratislavské hudobné slávnosti in Slovak) is an international festival of classical music that takes place annually in the city of Bratislava, Slovakia. It is a major Slovak musical event. The festival is organised by the Slovak Philharmonic and its honorary president is Edita Gruberová.

== History ==
The first festival took place between 8 April and 7 May 1965; since 1971 the festival takes place each autumn, opening new season (today the beginning of the festival is temporarily postponed to November). The festival linked to a tradition of previous 14 years of festival Bratislava Spring (Bratislavská jar). Since 1973, the festival is a member of European Festivals Association.

The organizing committee (with Alexander Moyzes as a president) originally intended the festival as a platform for contemporary music but it presents today a wide scale of music with particular focus on Slovak classical music.

== See also ==
- List of music festivals
