= LaLaLa Fest =

Annual music and arts festival in Southeast Asia

LaLaLa Festival
- Status: Active
- Genre: Pop; rock; contemporary R&B; electronic
- Frequency: Annually (since 2024)
- Locations: Lembang, West Java, Indonesia (2016, 2018–2019); Jakarta, Indonesia (2024–present); Pasay, Philippines (2026)
- Country: Indonesia; Philippines; Thailand (scheduled for 2027)
- Years active: 2016, 2018–2019, 2024–present
- Inaugurated: 5 November 2016
- Founder: Carmel Puma
- Most recent: 22–23 August 2026 (Indonesia); 21 August 2026 (Philippines)
- Next event: 14 January 2027 (Philippines); 17 January 2027 (Indonesia); 20 January 2027 (Thailand)
- Organiser: The Group; Wilbros Live (Philippines)
- Website: lalalafest.com

LaLaLa Festival, also known as LaLaLa Fest, is a music festival originating in Indonesia. Established in 2016, the festival initially took place in forested areas of Lembang, West Java, before relocating to Jakarta in 2024. It features local and international musicians across several genres, including pop, rock, electronic music, and contemporary R&B. The festival expanded to the Philippines in 2026, holding its first Philippine edition in Pasay, Metro Manila, and is scheduled to expand to Thailand in 2027, with the first edition in Pak Kret, Nonthaburi.

LaLaLa Fest was established by music promoter Carmel Puma and organized by The Group. Its early editions incorporated outdoor stages, lighting installations, and forest surroundings. Following the cancellation of its planned 2020 edition because of the COVID-19 pandemic, the festival resumed in August 2024 at Jakarta International Expo.

== History ==
=== Establishment and inaugural edition (2016) ===
LaLaLa Fest held its inaugural edition on 5 November 2016 at Grafika Cikole in Lembang, West Bandung Regency, West Java. Organized by The Group, the event combined live musical performances with a pine forest setting.

The festival featured three performance areas named LaLaLa Stage, Future Stage, and Nature Stage, which hosted simultaneous performances. Its lineup included Irish rock band Kodaline, Australian electronic duo Bag Raiders, British singer Jasmine Thompson, South Korean rapper Keith Ape, Filipino acoustic duo M.Y.M.P., and Indonesian performers Isyana Sarasvati, Maliq & D'Essentials, Payung Teduh, Teza Sumendra, and Float.

Heavy rainfall affected the venue, leaving sections of the grounds muddy. Some performances experienced scheduling delays, while attendees encountered difficulties accessing certain areas of the site. Kodaline performed the festival's closing set, which continued into the early hours of 6 November.

=== Second and third editions (2018–2019) ===
The second edition took place on 10 March 2018 at Orchid Forest Cikole in Lembang. The lineup included international performers Oh Wonder, Tom Odell, Blackbear, Wafia, Bondax, Blonde, Route 94, and RKCB. Indonesian acts included The Groove, Ten2Five, Rendy Pandugo, Adhitia Sofyan, Dipha Barus, Pusakata, Reality Club, and Roycdc.

The festival also held a competition for emerging musicians. Four acts, Gabriel Mayo, Dizzyhead, Moko Discover, and Radak Banu, were selected from approximately 100 applicants to perform at the event.

The third edition took place on 23 February 2019, again at Orchid Forest Cikole. Its lineup included English electronic duo Honne, South Korean singer Crush, American singer-songwriter Jeremy Passion, English producer Joe Hertz, and Indonesian performers Sheila on 7, Fourtwnty, and Ardhito Pramono.

=== Cancellation of the 2020 edition ===
LaLaLa Fest was scheduled to hold its fourth edition on 18–19 April 2020 at Orchid Forest Cikole. The planned lineup included LANY, Simple Plan, Tori Kelly, Aurora, Heize, Mondo Grosso, Bunga Citra Lestari, and Isyana Sarasvati.

On 17 March 2020, the organizers canceled the event because of concerns about the spread of COVID-19. They announced refunds for ticket holders. According to Antara, the two-day festival had been expected to accommodate approximately 14,000 attendees.

The festival did not hold another edition until 2024.

=== Return and relocation to Jakarta (2024) ===
LaLaLa Fest returned on 23–25 August 2024 at Jakarta International Expo (JIExpo) in Kemayoran, Jakarta, marking its relocation from the forest venues of Lembang to an urban exhibition complex.

The organizers adopted a concept called Forest Fantasy, incorporating nature-themed visual elements and installations into the urban venue. The festival used three stages named LaLaLa Stage, Karma Stage, and Bloom Stage.

The three-day lineup included Conan Gray, Madison Beer, Aurora, Tyla, Bruno Major, Sabrina Claudio, Nothing but Thieves, The Temper Trap, Tori Kelly, and 10cm. Indonesian performers included Isyana Sarasvati, Maliq & D'Essentials, Nadin Amizah, Reality Club, Danilla, GAC, Ardhito Pramono, and Eva Celia.

=== 2025 edition ===
The 2025 edition took place from 22 to 24 August at JIExpo. Performances were distributed across three stages: LaLaLa Stage, Karma Stage, and Bloom Stage.

Camila Cabello headlined the opening day, which also featured The Rose, Hollow Coves, Beach Weather, and Johnny Stimson.

The second day featured LANY, Mew, Alina Baraz, Do As Infinity, Mayer Hawthorne, and Hannah Bahng. Mew's appearance was part of the band's farewell performances.

The Black Eyed Peas headlined the final day, alongside Keshi, JVKE, Tinashe, Yung Kai, South Korean girl group Hearts2Hearts, Japanese singer Rei Yasuda, and Mondo Grosso.

=== Tenth anniversary and 2026 Jakarta edition ===
LaLaLa Fest held its tenth-anniversary edition on 22–23 August 2026 at JIExpo. The festival expanded to four stages.

The lineup included Rex Orange County, The Flaming Lips, Kodaline, Astrid S, Matt Maltese, Jordan Rakei, Steve Lacy, Honne, Two Door Cinema Club, FLO, Dermot Kennedy, and.

The 2026 event followed the festival's international expansion, where its inaugural Philippine edition took place one day before the Jakarta event began.

=== International expansion ===
==== Philippines ====
LaLaLa Fest expanded to the Philippines in 2026, marking the first time the festival was held outside Indonesia. Its inaugural Philippine edition took place on 21 August at the World Trade Center Metro Manila in Pasay and was presented by Philippine concert promoter Wilbros Live.

The event featured Steve Lacy, Two Door Cinema Club, FLO, Dermot Kennedy, and Australian singer Matthew Ifield. Local performers included Ben&Ben, Maki, Over October, Dilaw, and fitterkarma. Other Asian performers included Indonesian singer Isyana Sarasvati, Thai band KIKI, and South Korean band HOA.

The festival also featured a separate DJ stage, with performances by Ookay, Rave Republic, Harry Hayes, and Lizzy Wang.

Steve Lacy performed the festival's final set. During his appearance, he discussed meeting members of his Filipino father's family, some of whom attended the event.

==== Announced 2027 expansion ====
In October 2026, the organizers announced three festival editions for January 2027, covering the Philippines, Indonesia, and Thailand.

The Philippine edition is scheduled for 14 January 2027 at the Philippine Arena in Bulacan. Its announced lineup included British singer Olivia Dean, Filipino girl group Bini, and Filipino bands Up Dharma Down, Lola Amour, and SunKissed Lola.

The Indonesian edition is scheduled for 17 January at the Indonesia Convention Exhibition (ICE BSD City) complex in Tangerang Regency, Banten. Its announced performers include Olivia Dean, Jungle, St. Vincent, DYGL, Mali, Billyrrom, and Rum Jungle.

The Thailand edition, titled LaLaLa Presents Bangkok, is scheduled for 20 January at Impact Challenger Hall 3 in the Bangkok Metropolitan Region. Its announced lineup includes Olivia Dean, Jungle, Thai rapper Milli, KIKI, and Cyndi Seui. The event is planned as the festival's first edition in Thailand.

== Festival editions ==
| Year | Date | Location | Venue | Notes | Ref. |
|---|---|---|---|---|---|
| 2016 | 5 November | Lembang, West Java, Indonesia | Grafika Cikole | Inaugural edition | |
| 2018 | 10 March | Lembang, West Java, Indonesia | Orchid Forest Cikole | Second edition | |
| 2019 | 23 February | Lembang, West Java, Indonesia | Orchid Forest Cikole | Third edition | |
| 2020 | 18–19 April | Lembang, West Java, Indonesia | Orchid Forest Cikole | Canceled because of the COVID-19 pandemic | |
| 2024 | 23–25 August | Jakarta, Indonesia | Jakarta International Expo | First edition in Jakarta | |
| 2025 | 22–24 August | Jakarta, Indonesia | Jakarta International Expo | | |
| 2026 | 21 August | Pasay, Philippines | World Trade Center Metro Manila | First Philippine edition | |
| 2026 | 22–23 August | Jakarta, Indonesia | Jakarta International Expo | Tenth-anniversary edition | |
| 2027 | 14 January | Bulacan, Philippines | Philippine Arena | Scheduled | |
| 2027 | 17 January | Tangerang Regency, Indonesia | Indonesia Convention Exhibition | Scheduled | |
| 2027 | 20 January | Bangkok metropolitan area, Thailand | IMPACT Challenger Hall 3 | Scheduled; planned first Thai edition | |

== See also ==
- List of music festivals
