= Lagos International Jazz Festival =

Annual music festival in Lagos, Nigeria

- Genre: Jazz
- Locations: Freedom park, Lagos, Nigeria
- Years active: 2000–present
- Founders: Ayoola Shadare
- Organiser: Inspiro Productions
- Website: lagosinternationaljazzfestival.com

The Lagos International Jazz Festival (LIJF), also known as Lagos Jazz Fest, is an annual celebration of jazz music and culture that was founded by Ayoola Shadare of Inspiro Productions and takes place in Lagos, Nigeria.

== Festivity ==
Held since 2008 with major contributions from the Lagos Jazz Society, the Lagos International Jazz Festival is a three-day event. The 2016 festival was split between a two-day standard edition held at Freedom Park, Lagos, and a one-day luxury edition happening at The Bay Lounge Waterfront, Lekki, with both events commencing at 6pm. Musicians featured at the festival (either as guests or performers) include Aṣa, Courtney Pine, Freshly Ground, Beat Kaestli and Grammy Award-winning artistes such as Lekan Babalola and Jermaine Jackson among others. The 2016 Jazz festival incorporated in its programme Jazz Appreciation Month (JAM) and International Jazz Day.

Also, the 2017 LIJ Festival was celebrated in collaboration with the Lagos@50 therefore, 50 musician were invited including two indigenous fuji artist like Akande Obesere and Malaika were called to perform. During the event the founder of LIJF, Ayoola Shadare in his speech said one of the purpose of the festival is to honour the indigenous musicians as other countries do. The theme for the year is ‘505050JAZZ Lagos@50’, the theme is described as 50 musicians playing 50 Lagos songs at the Lagos @ 50, the event which served as a roundup to the Jazz Appreciation Month (JAM), on 30 April, the International Jazz Day celebrated worldwide. And the celebration was held at Freedom park.

The 2018 Festival marked the 10th anniversary of the LIJF which was celebrated in the honour of the late Hugh Masekela, the event was graced by great jazz musicians including Saxophonist like Mike Aremu.

The 2019 edition was dedicated to Oliver Mtukudzi, an African jazz icon who died on 23 January 2019. He was a Zimbabwean musician, businessman, philanthropist, human rights activist, and UNICEF Goodwill Ambassador for the Southern Africa Region, known as "Tuku."

== See also ==
- List of music festivals
- List of jazz festivals
