= List of film festivals in Taiwan =

This is a list of film festivals in Taiwan.

== Active festivals ==
| Name | Chinese | Est. | City | Type | Details |
|---|---|---|---|---|---|
| Annual Screwdriver International Student Short Film Festival | 青春影展 | 2001 | Tainan | Competition | |
| Chiayi International Art Doc Film Festival | 嘉義國際藝術紀錄影展 | 2014 | Chiayi City | International Art Documentaries | |
| Golden Horse Film Festival and Awards | 台北金馬影展 | 1962 | Taipei | Competition | It is one of the four major Chinese-language film awards, also among the most prestigious and respected film awards in the Chinese-speaking film industry. It is also one of the major annual awards presented in Taiwan along with Golden Bell Awards for television production and Golden Melody Awards for music. |
| Kaohsiung Film Festival | 高雄電影節 | 2001 | Kaohsiung | Mixed | The festival screens both locally produced and international films, in all genres and lengths. The festival also has an international competition section where it hands out awards for outstanding short films. |
| South Taiwan Film Festival | 南方影展 | 2001 | Tainan | Mixed | STFF, the oldest indie film festival in Taiwan, has been carrying its legacy for over 20 years since 2001. It screens panorama programs featuring films from around the world and hosts the South Award-Chinese film competition every two years. The STFF team views the festival as more than just entertainment or a cinephile activity; it's a media platform for public discussion and a reflection of modern societies. Their goal is to provide the audience with a diverse range of perspectives and showcase radical, avant-garde, and innovative aesthetics and spirits in films. |
| Taichung International Animation Festival | 臺中國際動畫影展 | 2015 | Taichung | Animated films | |
| Taipei Film Festival | 台北電影節 | 1998 | Taipei | Mixed | Taipei Film Festival is the only festival in Taiwan that offers a New Talent Competition for aspiring directors from around the world and a Taipei Awards competition for Taiwanese filmmakers. |
| Taiwan International Documentary Festival | 台灣國際紀錄片影展 | 1998 | Taipei | Competition | |
| Taiwan International Ethnographic Film Festival | 台灣國際民族誌影展 | 2001 | Taipei | International | Each year the festival organizes around a central theme, curating a selection of films and organizing discussions that explore a specific aspect of human life. TIEFF also includes a “New Visions” category that showcases notable ethnographic films made within the past two years. |
| Taiwan International Queer Film Festival | 臺灣國際酷兒影展 | 2014 | Taipei | Special interest | It is the first and LGBTQ film festival in Taiwan. |
| Taoyuan Film Festival | 桃園電影節 | 2013 | Taoyuan | Special interest | |
| Women Make Waves | 台灣國際女性影展 | 1993 | Taipei | Special interest | It is the first and only women's film festival in the country as well as the largest women's film festival in Asia |
| Youth Film Festival | 青春影展 | 2004 | Kaohsiung | Competition | A Taiwanese student film competition film festival. |

== Defunct ==
| Name | Chinese | Years | City | Type | Details |
|---|---|---|---|---|---|
| New Taipei City Film Festival | 新北市電影節 | 2012–2014 | New Taipei | Mixed | |
| Taiwan International Animation Festival | 台灣國際動畫影展 | 2003–2008 | Taipei | Animated films | |
