= Czechtalent Zlín =

Music festival in Zlín, Czech Republic

Czechtalent Zlín (formerly Zlín Talent) is a national musical festival held in the city of Zlín in the Czech Republic, featuring young up-and-coming singers and composers. It is an annual event held in July, and was first held in May 1996 with Boney M and Peter Nagy appearing as guests.
