= Hà Okio =

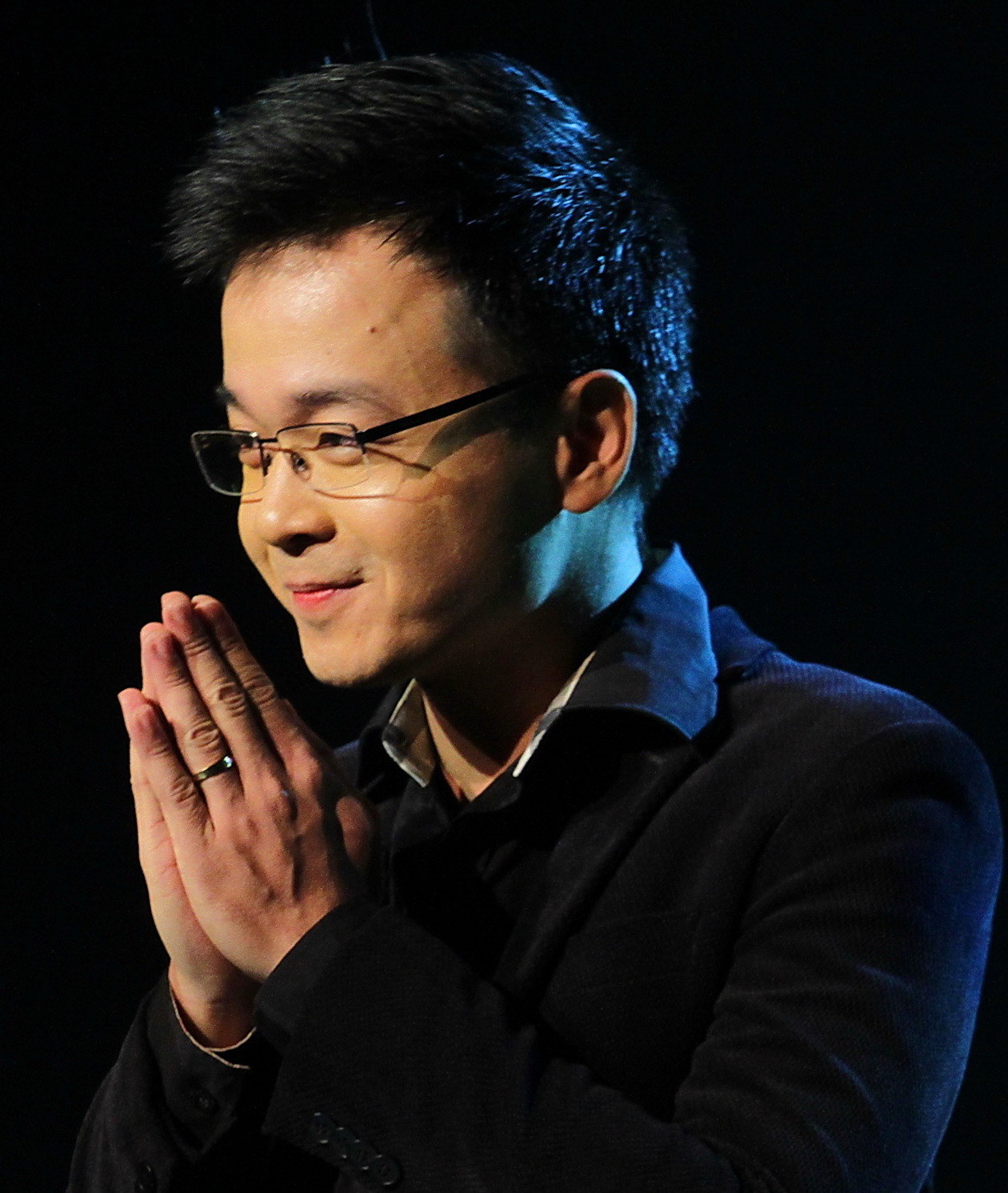
- Hà Okio in 2012

Background information
- Born: Hà Lương Ngọc; 15 November 1981 (age 44)
- Origin: Vietnam
- Genres: Alternative hip hop, R&B, neo soul, pop rock, folk
- Occupations: Singer, rapper, song writer, entertainer, record producer, actor
- Instruments: Singing/vocals, guitar
- Years active: 1998–present
- Website: www.facebook.com/haokio.info

Hà Lương Ngọc, also known by his stage name Hà Okio (born 15 November 1981), is a Vietnamese recording artist, musician, producer and actor. He has taught himself to sing, write music, play guitar and act. Early in his career, he quickly established his reputation as a rapper, singer and songwriter.

Hà Okio lives in Saigon, Vietnam. He is an ambassador of 350.org, a global environmental organization against climate change and The Earth Hour campaign (year 2012, 2013, 2014). In 2013, Hà Okio agreed to take on the role ambassador of The Red Journey (Hành Trình Đỏ) run by the Ministry of Public Health of Vietnam. He's also one of the Commit Vietnam ambassadors.

In 2013, he was nominated as the Sexiest Vegetarian Celebrity in the world by PETA, People for the Ethical Treatment of Animals, alongside about 300 international celebs including Bill Clinton, Paul McCartney, Mike Tyson, Prince, Alicia Silverstone, Anne Hathaway, Brigitte Bardot, Diane Warren, Ellen DeGeneres, Erykah Badu, Fiona Apple, India.Arie, Joan Jett, Leona Lewis, Michelle Pfeiffer, and Shania Twain.

He performed at Soundfest, Beatfest the 2 first biggest music festivals in Vietnam with estimated 50,000 goers each, with Vpop stars and international acts like Big Bang (South Korean band), Taio Cruz, Tata Young, Kimberley Caldwell (Top 7 American Idol), Shane Ward, Demi Lovato. VTV3, Vietnam's Got Talent, HTV Awards and many more have invited Hà Okio to perform on their shows, live on national television. In 2012 Hà Okio won the Vietnam Song Award for Best Artist (with Saigon Iced Milk Coffee_ Saigon Cafe Sua Da). Yasuy, top 2 finalists of Vietnam Idol, performed Noi Ay (The Place) which is written and first recorded by Hà Okio, at the finale of Vietnam Idol 2012 and it crowns him the winner of the 2012 contest.

In late 2013, Your Heart, written and performed by Hà Okio, was on the Grammy 2014 ballot. That makes Hà Okio the first Vietnamese artist has ever entered the prestigious Grammy awards.

== Music career ==
He produces/co-produces for some local artists and himself. He has lent his voice to several records and original soundtracks. 2 video clips out of his song "Tung Bay" got hundred thousands of views. His song "Phố " (The city) was a number 1 hit on Xone FM VN10 chart from October 2010.

His single "Nơi Ấy" (The Places) (written by himself) topped the VN10 chart and Top40 from July 2011. He has been a judge on Be A Star, a singing contest on radio.

In 2011, he wrote and sang in "Một Thế Giới" (One World) which also features more than 30 artists around Vietnam in an effort to promote 350.org and moving-planet.org, environmental organizations against climate change. Một Thế Giới reached number 9 on YanTV Vpop 20 chart.

"Neu Nhu" (If) (written and sung by himself), one of the songs from Long Ruồi OST, reached number 1 on both VN10 and Top40 chart, XoneFM from October 2011.

He had another hit with Như Là Mơ (Hà Okio feat. NPT.Trang) number 8 on YanTV Vpop 20 and ZingMp3 chart. In December 2011, he released another single "Sai Gon Cafe Sua Da" (MV on YouTube) which is number 1 on both VN10 and Top40 XoneFM radio, right after the number 1 hit "Neu Nhu" (If). It's also in Yan Vpop 20 chart and other tophits charts.

Early in 2012 he released his first single of the year Biển Xanh Và Nắng Vàng (Ocean in the Sun) and it reached No.1 on both VN10 and Top40 hits list XoneFM from March. (Bonus track: Thì Đó (Tell Me 'bout It) [Mưa Đầu Mùa OST] feat. Tú Vi). It's also in Yan Vpop 20 chart from April the same year.

Later on Hà Okio wrote and gave his voice in Những Phút Giây Này (These Very Minutes), theme song for the 2012 Earth Hour Campaign in Vietnam.

He performed in the Soundfest 2012, the biggest international music festival in Vietnam thus far for about 50,000 goers.

His live concerts attract huge media attention. His next single is reportedly the anticipating "Hà Nội Phố" (Streets of Hanoi). He lends his voice to an MTV EXIT project in 2012 which is against human trafficking.

In July 2012, Hà Okio released his first single written by himself in English titled Your Heart which quickly drew a lot of attention from critics, his peers and fans.

Your Heart reached number 1 in August 2012 on VN10 XoneFM and stayed there for a month. The music video of Your Heart is at number 3 in Top 10 MV of the year 2012.

In January 2013, he released a CD & DVD album titled "Vpop: Songs Not In The Key Of A#". The album is written, performed and produced by Hà Okio; programmed, mixed and co-produced by Duong Khac Linh.

In February 2013, one of the songs in the album titled " Đừng Bao Giờ Hết Hy Vọng" (Never Lose Sight Of Hope) reached no.1 spot on both VN10 and Top40 XoneFM, Vietnam.

"Những Phút Giây Này" (These Very Minutes) brought Hà Okio to number 1 spot on VN10 hitlist of XoneFm in June 2013.

Hà Okio wrote and performed the titled track "Nguoi Anh Em" for the block buster movie Teo Em starring Thai Hoa, Johny Tri Nguyen.

His single "Everybody has A Choice" (released in late 2013) has reached No.1 on top VN10 from Feb 2014.

In March 2014, he was asked by The Earth Hour VN to write the main theme "Nhiều Hơn Nhiều Hơn Thế" (More And More Than That) for that year campaign. Also in the big event, his song Everybody Has A Choice is the music in a flashmob gathering thousands of young people, white and blue collars workers around Vietnam.

In 2015, he wrote "Vì 1 Thế Giới Không Thịt Chó" (For A World Of No Dog Meat) to support the dogs saving campaign in the world.

== Acting career ==
In 2010 he starred as Bob Cratchit in "A Christmas Carol – A New Musical" with Music by Steve Parsons and Book & Lyrics by John Popa. A fully staged musical version of Charles Dickens' classic tale directed by Brian Riedlinger. This is a fan cam part of the musicals In 2013, Hà Okio worked with Michael Parks Masterson, a famous US Broadway artist, on a broadway musical project in Vietnam. He played in Guys and Dolls the musical.

== Original Sound Tracks ==
- 2009 "Tiếc", "Tung Bay" with The Little Wings in The Clash (Johnny Tri Nguyen, Ngo Thanh Van)
- 2007 "Romeo & Juliet Tân Thời (A Time 4 Us)" in The Hot Kiss (Johnny Tri Nguyen, Thanh Hang, Thanh Loc, Hoai Linh)
- 2008 "Công Dân @ (Ngày Qua Ngày)" in Passport To Love (Binh Minh, Kathy Uyen)
- 2009 "Ta Là Ta" in The Super Smurfy Models (Yen Trang, Vy Oanh)
- 2010 "Phố" in Lucky Family (Hong Đao, Quang Minh, Don Nguyen)
- 2011 "Như Là Mơ" in "Long Ruồi" (Thái Hoà, Tinna Tình)
- 2011 "Nếu Như" in "Long Ruồi" (Thái Hòa, Tinna Tình)
- 2011 "Thì Đó" in "Mưa đầu mùa" (Tú Vy)
- 2013 "Người Anh Em" in "Tèo Em" (Thái Hoà)
- 2014 "SG Cafe Sữa Đá" in "Bếp Hát"

== Charity activities ==
Ha has worked for Living Values VietNam, a non-governmental organization of Association for Living Values Education International (ALIVE).
