= Metalfest =

Music festival in Europe

- Genre: Metal
- Dates: May, June
- Years active: since 2007

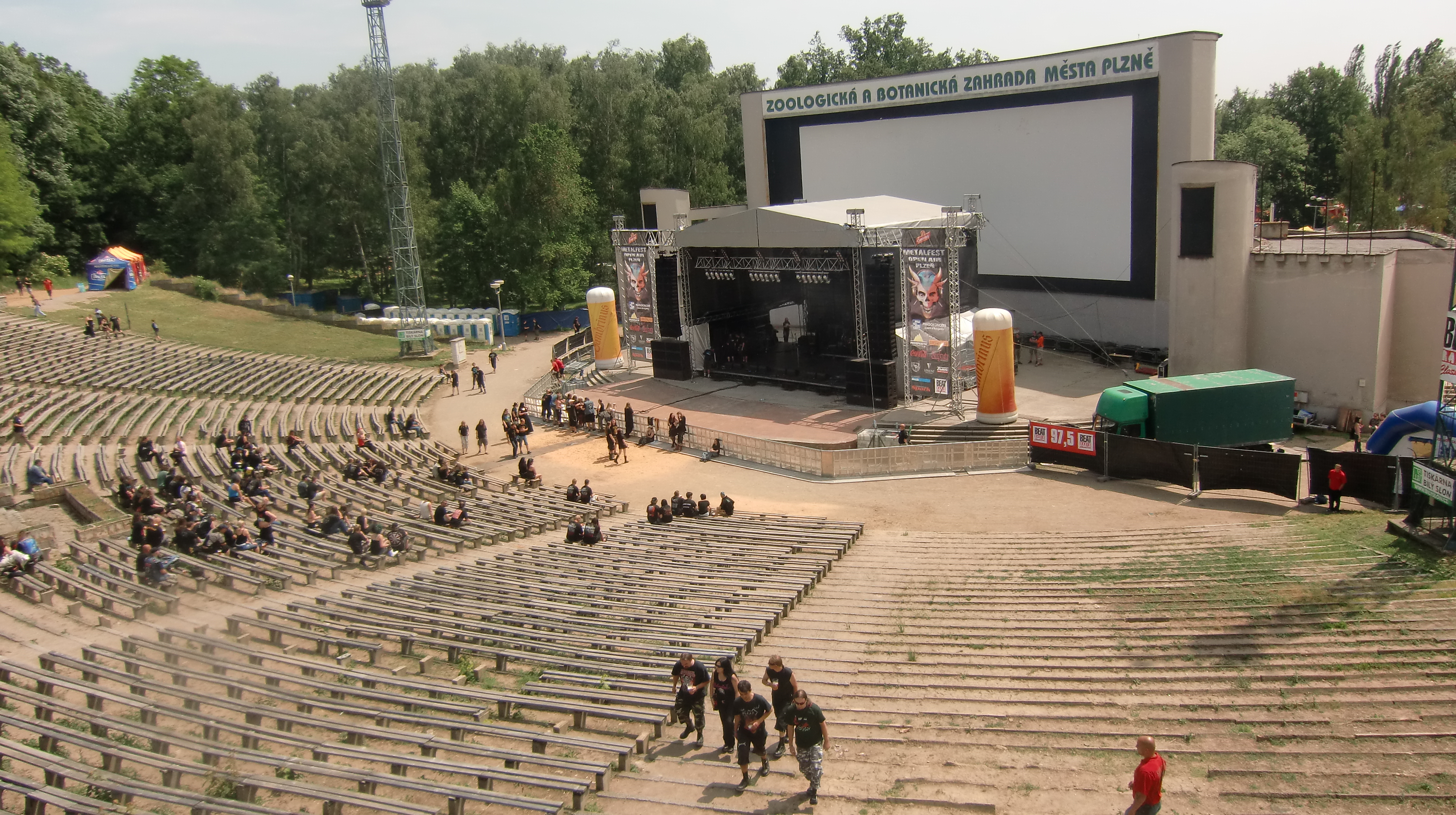
Preparations to conduct the Metalfest, 2011

Metalfest is a metal music festival. Since its introduction in Austria in 2007, Metalfest has spread to various European countries.

Metalfest Croatia was held in Zadar, Croatia in June 2012.

The lineup included Megadeth, Blind Guardian, W.A.S.P. (cancelled), Kreator, In Extremo, Behemoth, Moonspell, Hypocrisy, Ensiferum, Fear Factory, Brezno, Alestorm, Ashes You Leave, Legion of the Damned, Dark Tranquillity (cancelled), Symphony X, Powerwolf, and Rising Dream.

In 2013 Metalfest Open Air had three editions: The Polish was held in Jaworzno, the German (called Metalfest Loreley, named after the nearby rock Lorelei) in Sankt Goarshausen and the Czech in Plzeň. In 2014 two editions: German – called Metalfest Loreley and Czech – Metalfest Open Air.

In 2013 the metal festival in Zadar continued under the name of Burning Sea Festival, and no longer collaborated with Rock the Nation and the other Metalfests.
