= Brett Epstein =

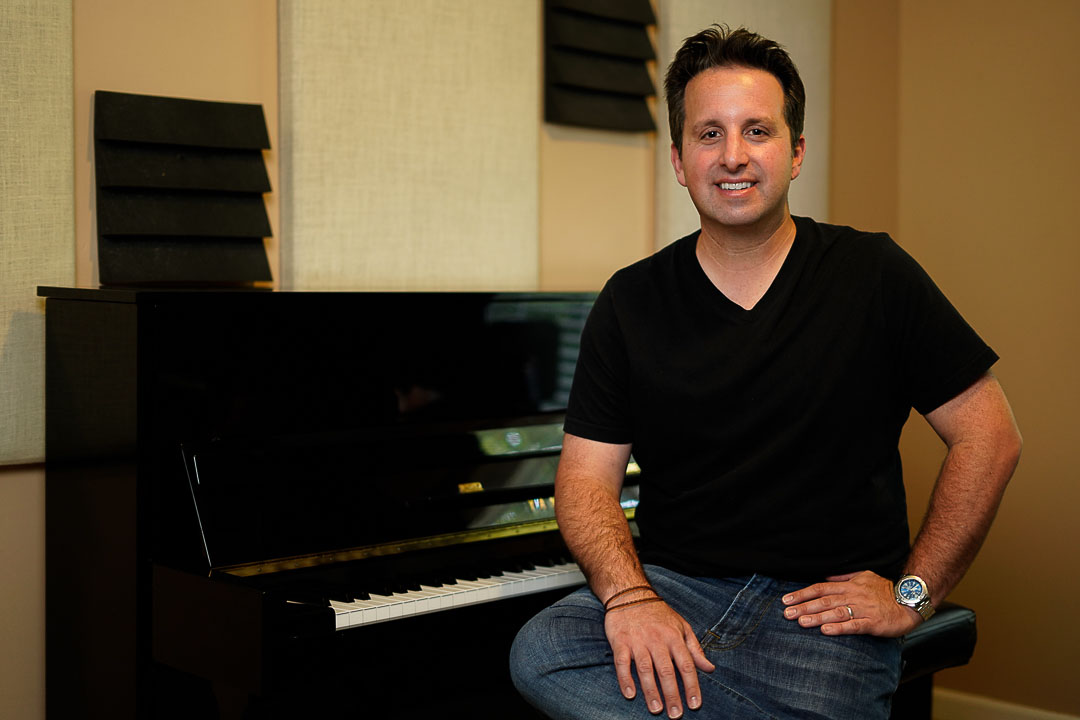
- Epstein at the piano

Background information
- Born: Brett Epstein; January 5, 1978 (age 48); Miami Beach, Florida, U.S.
- Origin: Los Angeles, California, U.S.
- Genres: Pop, pop rock, R&B
- Occupations: Musician, record producer, songwriter
- Instruments: Piano, Keyboards, Rhodes, Guitar, Drums, Synth Bass, Bass Guitar, Ukulele, Whistle
- Years active: 2006–present
- Website: brettepstein.com

Brett Epstein (born January 5, 1978) is a musician, songwriter and record producer. He studied at the Berklee College of Music in Boston. Epstein is a writer on the Kimberly Caldwell (American Idol) debut album "Without Regret", co-writing "Taking Back My Life". The album was released by Capitol Records. He wrote and produced two tracks entitled "Perfect Stranger" and "Temporary Life" on the Hilary Duff film Material Girls. Epstein has had his songs featured on PBS, specifically in a 9-11 special with the song "United States (Take A Good Look)", and he has had his songs used on the CBS show Ghost Whisperer. Epstein also had three songs on the USA Olympic Medalist Carly Patterson's debut Album 'Back to the Beginning' distributed by Universal Republic Records. In 2012 Epstein worked with Korean girl group Brown Eyed Girls co-writing and co-producing their single Come With Me. It was released on July 17, 2012, Brett played electric guitars on "Pride" off Cher's final album entitled, "Closer To The Truth" released Sept 24th 2013.

Epstein performs on all of his recordings (mainly pianos, synthesizers, guitars, and drum programming).

== Discography ==
Song	Artist	Album	Label
Pride	Cher	Closer To The Truth	Warner Bros.
Taking Back My Life	Kimberly Caldwell	Without Regret	Capitol Records
Come With Me	Brown Eyed Girls	The Original	Sony Music
Wing	Kim Bo Kyoung	groWing	Sony Korea
Perfect Stranger	Material Girls	Material Girls Motion Picture Soundtrack	MGM (2006)
Let Me Inside	Big Mama	TBD	Taillrunsmedia/YG Entertainment (2010)
I'm Not Supposed To Know	Ryan Beatty	TBD	OcSkee Entertainment
That's How I Roll	Jordan Jansen	TBD	Kite Records (2011)
Fall Short	K. Michelle	TBD	RCA Records (2012)
Gone	Carly Patterson	Back to the Beginning	Music Mind Records (2010)
The Chase	Carly Patterson	Back to the beginning	Music Mind Records (2010)
Temporary Life (Ordinary Girl)	Carly Patterson	Back to the beginning	Music Mind Records (2010)
Sidewalks	Brian Lam	EP	Contagious Songs (2012)

== TV/film ==
Song	Show/film	Production
Perfect Stranger	Ghost Whisperer	CBS
United States (Take A Good Look)	9-11 Looking Back... Moving Forward	PBS
Perfect Stranger	Material Girls	MGM
Music	Fox Sports	Fox Sports
Music	The Real Gilligan's Island	CBS
Temporary Life	Material Girls	MGM
Music	The Sweat Solution-30 for 30	ESPN
Music	LIFE FLIGHT	Lifetime (TV network)
Music	Operation Match	ESPN Films
Music	Little Blue Box	ESPN Films
Music	All the Rage (Saved by Sarno)	RUMUR Inc.
Music	Best Leftovers Ever	Netflix
Music	Botched	E!
Music	Double Shot At Love	MTV
Music	I Am Jazz	TLC
Music	Jersey Shore	MTV
Music	Love At First Flight	MTV
Music	Floribama Shore	MTV
Music	My Big Fat Fabulous Life	TLC
Music	Sweet Home	Netflix
Music	Zombie House Flipping	A&E
Music	Win or Else	ESPN Films
Music	The Ripe Stuff	SC Featured, ESPN, ESPN+
Music	Bananaland	ESPN2, ESPN+
Music	True Character	ESPN
