= Without Regret (album) =

Studio album by Kimberly Caldwell
- Released: April 19, 2011
- Recorded: 2009–2010
- Genre: Pop; pop rock
- Length: 40:21 (Original); 39:58 (Official release)
- Label: Vanguard; Capitol
- Producer: Marshall Altman; Tommy Henriksen; John-Mark Baxter Seltzer; MachoPsycho

Kimberly Caldwell chronology
Kimberly Caldwell (1996)	Without Regret (2011)

Singles from Without Regret
- 1. "Mess of You" Released: February 23, 2010; 2. "Desperate Girls & Stupid Boys" Released: December 3, 2010

Alternative cover
- Original 2010 cover

Professional ratings
Review scores
Source	Rating
AllMusic	2.5/5 stars
Slant Magazine	1.5/5 stars

Without Regret is the first major-label (and second overall) album from American Idol season two seventh place finalist, Kimberly Caldwell. The album was released on April 19, 2011.

== Background ==
Caldwell signed a record deal with Vanguard Records and Capitol Records, and her debut album Without Regret was scheduled to be released on April 6, 2010, but was delayed to a July 2010 release date due to the addition of three new songs: the single "Desperate Girls & Stupid Boys", "Naked" and "Hotter Without You", which replaced the songs "Cost of Love", "When I'm Not Around" and "Sleep While I Drive".

In December 2009, she released her first single "Mess of You" and in December 2010 she released "Desperate Girls & Stupid Boys". The video for "Desperate Girls & Stupid Boys" premiered on January 18, 2011 on VEVO.

Without Regret was delayed again to December 31 and after a fourth delay, the album was finally released on April 19, 2011, over a year after the original release date.

== Release and reception ==
The album received negative reviews. AllMusic critic Stephen Thomas Erlewine gave a rating of 2.5 out of 5 stars, writing: "Without Regret is designed as a reminder – a full-blown, air-brushed, impeccably manicured collection of power ballads and updated arena rock designed to showcase Caldwell's strut. Frequently, all these machinations just wind up playing like a straitjacketed, tempered-down Kelly Clarkson, retaining the oversized production but lacking the gargantuan hooks or personality, for that matter." Jonathan Keefe of Slant Magazine gave the album's rating a 1.5 out of 5 stars, writing: "Something that Caldwell struggled with during her time on American Idol was with song selections, and Without Regret is undone by some frankly awful songwriting. ... Still, Caldwell does her damndest to sell the terrible material with conviction and sincerity. Her voice is actually interesting: Her husky alto has a heavy rasp, and she displays quite a bit of power in her lower register."

== Singles ==
"Mess of You" was released as the first single on Caldwell's official website and MySpace page on December 17, 2009.

"Desperate Girls & Stupid Boys" was the second single released on December 3, 2010, which led to Caldwell to push back the release of the album to its current release date. The song debuted at number 30 on Billboard's Hot Dance Club Play Chart.

- "Naked" was released as the third single in 2011.

== Track listing ==
Original
No.	Title	Writer(s)	Length
1.	"Heart Like Mine"	Kara DioGuardi; Chad Kroeger; Joey Moi	4:01
2.	"Going Going Gone"	Wayne Rodrigues; Eric Schermerhorn; Delisha Thomas	3:50
3.	"Mess of You"	Alana Grace; Michael Ochs	3:10
4.	"Say Love"	Kimberly Caldwell; Sean Michael Kelly; Andy Thompson	4:22
5.	"Human After All"	Caldwell; Kelly; Marshall Altman	3:32
6.	"Taking Back My Life"	Caldwell; Brett Epstein	3:15
7.	"Cost of Love"	Diane Warren	5:00
8.	"Frozen"	Caldwell; Altman; Jason Gaviati; Ryan White	4:01
9.	"If You're Gonna Fall"	Lucie Silvas; Jon Green; Dennis Matkosky	3:43
10.	"When I'm Not Around"	Warren	3:40
11.	"Sleep While I Drive"	Melissa Etheridge	3:07

No.	Title	Writer(s)	Producer(s)	Length
1.	"Desperate Girls & Stupid Boys"	Tommy Henriksen; BC Jean; Zac Maloy	Tommy Henriksen	3:26
2.	"Heart Like Mine"	DioGuardi; Kroeger; Moi	Marshall Altman	4:01
3.	"Naked"	Jean; Maloy; Espen Lind; Amund Bjørklund	Henriksen	3:03
4.	"Hotter Without You"	John-Mark Baxter Seltzer	Henriksen; Seltzer; MachoPsycho	3:39
5.	"Say Love"	Caldwell; Kelly; Thompson	Altman	4:42
6.	"Mess of You"	Grace; Ochs	Altman	3:10
7.	"If You're Gonna Fall"	Silvas; Green; Matkosky	Altman	3:43
8.	"Taking Back My Life"	Epstein; Caldwell	Altman	3:15
9.	"Going Going Gone"	Rodrigues; Schermerhorn; Thomas	Altman	3:50
10.	"Frozen"	Caldwell; Altman; Gaviati; White	Altman	3:32
11.	"Human After All"	Caldwell; Altman; Kelly	Altman	3:£2
Total length:				39:58

== Personnel ==
Credits for Without Regret adapted from AllMusic.

- Marshall Altman – arranger, percussion, producer, programming, string arrangements, background vocals
- Adam Ayan – mastering
- John Baxter – vocal producer
- Matt Beard – photography
- Kimberly Caldwell – vocals
- Michael Chaves – additional production, acoustic and electric guitars
- Angelica Cob–Baehler – creative director
- Justin Cortelyou – engineer, vocal editing
- Richard Dodd – mastering
- Andy Grush – keyboards
- Tommy Henriksen – bass, engineer, guitar, keyboards, mixing, percussion, piano, producer, programming, synthesizer
- Sean Hurley – bass
- Izler – electric guitar
- Allison Kaplan – background vocals
- Tim Lauer – keyboards, synthesizer
- MachoPsycho – producer, synthesizer
- Jon Maddux – engineer
- Steven Melrose – A&R
- Ari Michelson – photography
- Jamie Muhoberac – bass, keyboards, piano
- Daniel Piscina – assistant engineer, digital editing
- Keely Hawkes Pressly – background vocals
- Zac Rae – effects, Fender Rhodes, noise, organ (Hammond), piano, synthesizer, Wurlitzer
- Eric Robinson – additional production, engineer, mixing
- Jason Roller – acoustic guitar
- John-Mark Baxter Seltzer – guitar, piano, producer, vocal producer, background vocals
- Carrie Smith – art direction, design, package design
- Chris Steffen – assistant engineer
- Aaron Sterling – drums, percussion
- Joe Zook – additional production, mixing
