= Taroko Music Festival =

Music festival in Xiulin, Hualien County, Taiwan

Taroko Music Festival 太魯閣音樂節
- Locations: Taroko National Park, Xiulin, Hualien County, Taiwan
- Years active: 2002-present
- Organiser: Taroko National Park Headquarters

The Taroko Music Festival (traditional Chinese: 太魯閣音樂節; simplified Chinese: 太鲁阁音乐节; pinyin: Tàilǔgé Yīnyuè Jié) is an annual music festival in Taroko National Park, Xiulin Township, Hualien County, Taiwan. It is organized by Taroko National Park Headquarters.

== History ==
The music festival started in 2002.

	Year	Date	Location	Reference
1	2014	20 and 27 September		
2	2015	17-18 October	Taroko Terrace	
3	2016	29 October	Taroko Tableland	
4	2017	28 October		
5	2018	20 October	Taroko Terrace	
6	2019	26 October	Taroko Terrace	
7	2020	24 October	Taroko Terrace	

== See also ==
- Music of Taiwan
- List of music festivals in Taiwan
