= Rock Ethos =

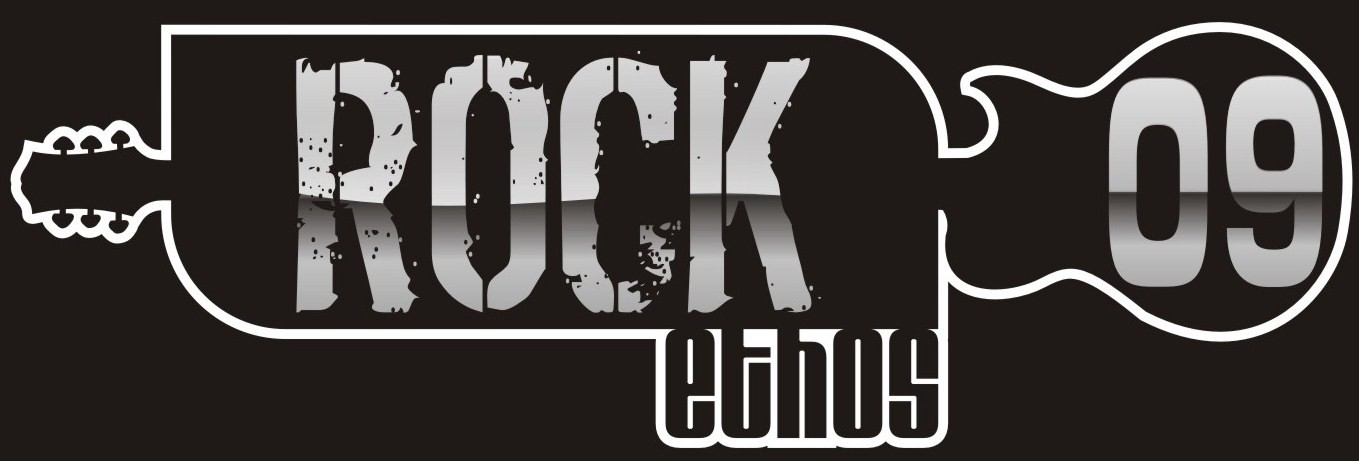
Logo of Rock Ethos 09

Rock Ethos was a free-entry invite-only rock music festival launched in 2008, and was discontinued after 2009, where the festival expanded to an two-day format. It aimed to promote original music in India and discourage piracy. Indian rock bands were allocated 45 minutes to perform their original compositions at the festival. In an attempt to recreate an international rock festival experience, Rock Ethos offered a carnival atmosphere with bungee jumping, paintball contests, and food and refreshment zones.

== Rock Ethos 2008 ==
Rock Ethos 2008

Rock Ethos 2008

Bungee Jumping at Rock Ethos 2008

Stage at Rock Ethos 2008

Crowd at Rock Ethos 2008
