= Kimberly Caldwell =

American singer and TV hostess

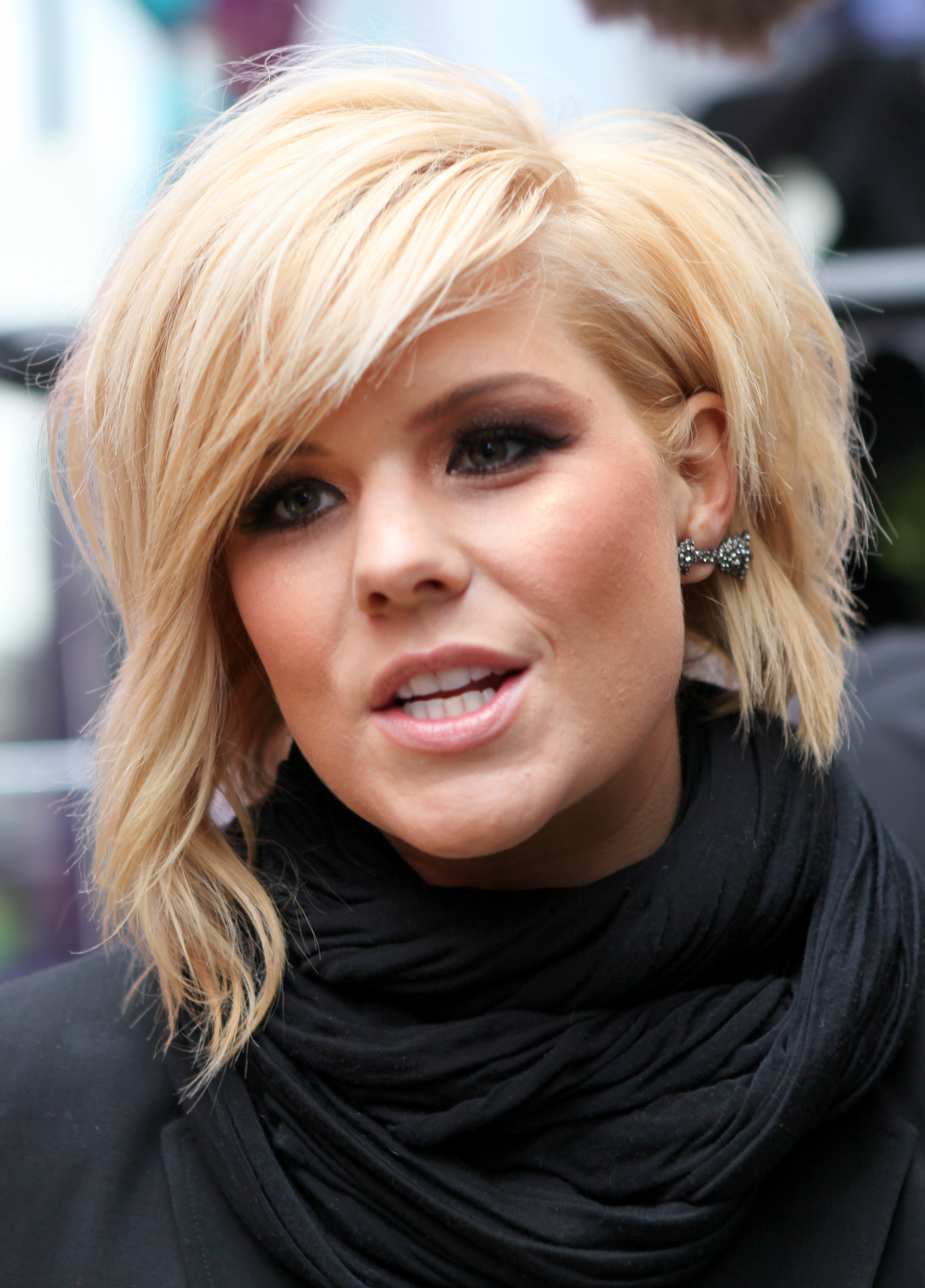
- Caldwell in 2009

Background information
- Born: Kimberly Ann Caldwell
- Genres: Pop rock
- Occupations: Singer; actress; television hostess
- Years active: 2003–present
- Labels: Story Road Records; Vanguard Records/Capitol Records (2009–present)
- Website: www.Kimberly-caldwell.com

Kimberly Ann Caldwell-Harvey is an American singer and television hostess. She rose to fame when she was a finalist on the second season of American Idol. After her American Idol stint, Caldwell was an entertainment correspondent and hosted various shows on the TV Guide Network. She released her debut album Without Regret on April 19, 2011.

== Biography ==
=== Early life ===
Caldwell first sang publicly at age five in beauty pageants. She was a five-time junior vocalist winner on Star Search, and she also performed at the Grand Ole Opry. In 1995, she sang at the 50th wedding anniversary of former president George H. W. Bush and Barbara Bush. Caldwell also appeared on the second and final season of Popstars: USA, where she was rejected from the group and told she would do better as a solo vocalist.

Following her run on the second season of American Idol, Caldwell started working as a correspondent for the entertainment/extreme sports program 54321 on FOX Sports Network. She covered various events and movie premieres for the show before joining her fellow Season 2 Idol finalists on the road for the American Idols LIVE! tour, which played in 44 cities across the United States.

== Recent projects ==
In 2008, Caldwell released two singles, "Fear of Flying" and "Gave Yourself Away". She also began filming a television series in 2010, Twentysixmiles aka Catalina Island miniseries, with John Schneider, and hosting a television game show called Jingles.

Caldwell hosted the television series, P. Diddy's Starmaker, that premiered in January 2009. On the 2009 New Year's Day edition of Deal or No Deal, Caldwell was a supporter of her hometown friend Tunde Oyeneyin.

In 2012, Caldwell hosted the television series, Best Ink.

== Personal life ==
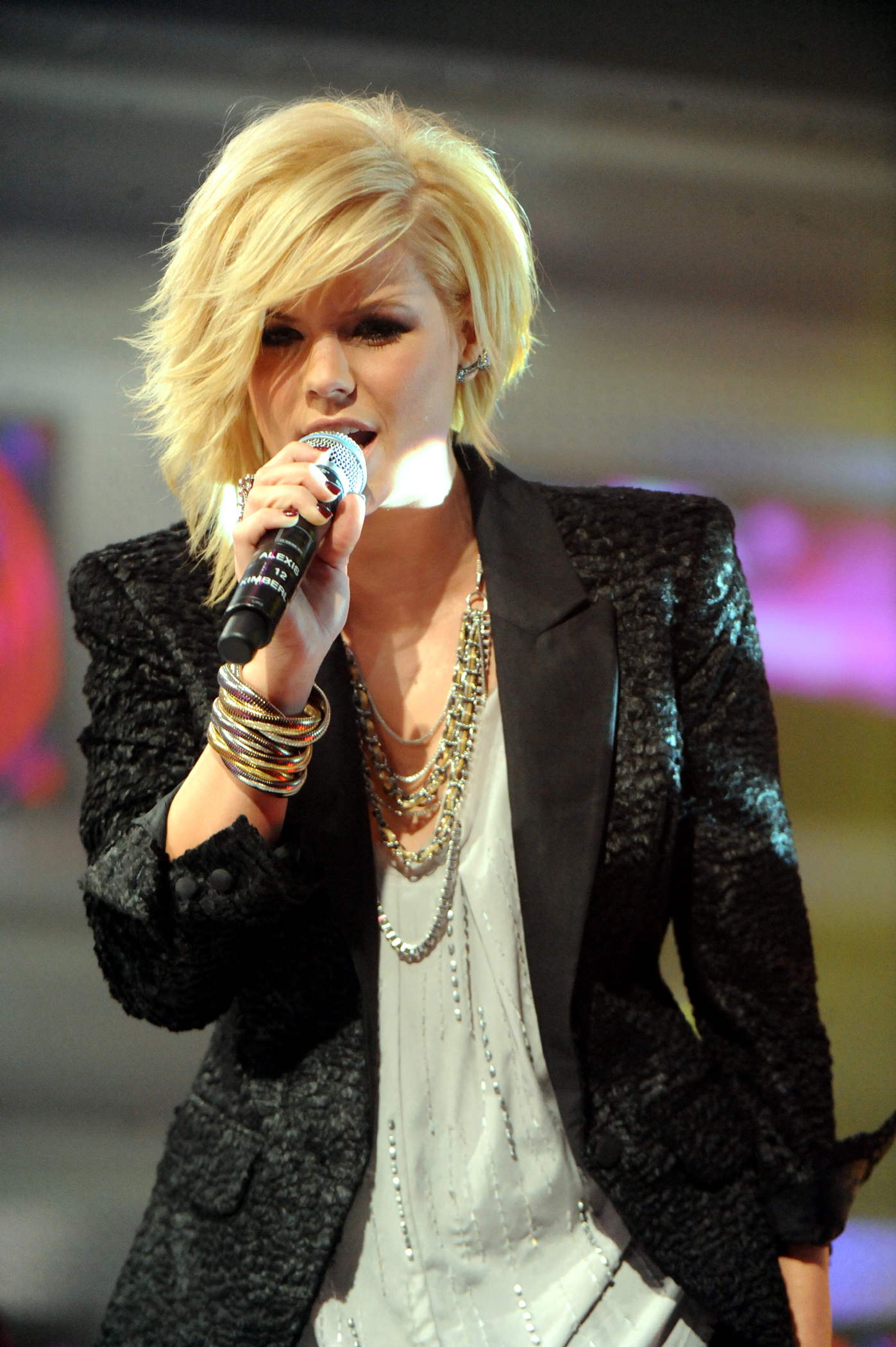
Caldwell performing on stage.

In 2006 her first single "Who Will You Run To" was released. A song written by Diane Warren and originally recorded by the band Heart. This single was released on Story Road Records.

In May 2008, Caldwell was asked out on a date by American Idol winner David Cook while on the red carpet before the show's seventh-season finale. Their relationship lasted until January 12, 2009, when rumors of a breakup with Cook were confirmed by Caldwell's rep, who stated in In Touch magazine: "Kimberly and David ended their relationship just before the holidays. The couple remain good friends and being very private people, appreciate their privacy at this time."

Caldwell was featured on the August 25, 2010 episode of LA Ink, where she received a tattoo on her back of lyrics from her song "With You I Can".

On June 18, 2011, Caldwell was crowned "Queen of Don't H8" at Nashville Pride, a title handed to her in honor of her work with the LGBT community.

Caldwell got engaged to professional soccer player Jordan Harvey, having met him in Philadelphia when he played for the Philadelphia Union. They were married on December 31, 2014, in Palm Springs, California. Their daughter was born on October 7, 2015. Their second daughter was born on February 18, 2020.

== Career ==
=== Without Regret (2010–present) ===
On May 21, 2009, Caldwell announced she had just signed a record deal, and her debut album Without Regret would hit stores on April 6, 2010. She later announced that the album would be delayed until July due to the addition of new songs. It was later announced that Without Regret would be delayed yet again with the release date being set for December 31. The album was finally released on April 19, 2011, over a year after the original release date. Caldwell co-wrote the song Tacking Back My Life with Brett Epstein.

In December 2009, she released her first single "Mess of You", and in December 2010, she released "Desperate Girls & Stupid Boys". The video for "Desperate Girls & Stupid Boys" premiered on January 18, 2011, on VEVO.

== Discography ==
=== Studio albums ===
Title	Details	Sales
Kimberly Caldwell	Release date: 1996; Label: Self-released; Formats: CD, CS	—
Without Regret	Release date: April 19, 2011; Label: Vanguard/Capitol Records; Formats: CD, music download	US: 3,000

=== Singles ===
Year	Single	Peak positions	Album
Year	Single	US Dance	Album
2006	"Who Will You Run To"	—	Non-album song
2008	"Fear of Flying"	—	Non-album song
2009	"Mess of You"	—	Without Regret
2010	"Desperate Girls & Stupid Boys"	30	Without Regret
2011	"Naked"	—	Without Regret
"—" denotes releases that did not chart

== Filmography ==
=== Film ===
Year	Title	Role	Notes
2007	Wrong Turn 2: Dead End	Kimberly	
2016	Monkey Up	ET Correspondent	

=== Television ===
Year	Title	Role	Notes
2003	American Idol	Herself / Contestant	Season 2
2005	Life on a Stick	Ginger	Episode: "Fish Song"
2006	Celebrity Paranormal Project	Herself	Episode: "Mad Ray"
2009	P. Diddy's Starmaker	Herself / Host	10 episodes
2012	Franklin & Bash	Bree	Episode: "Waiting on a Friend"
2014	Recipe for Love	Host #2	Television film

== Music videos ==
Year	Video	Director
2010	"Mess of You"	Skinny
2011	"Desperate Girls & Stupid Boys"	Lex Halaby
