= Ten Days Off =

10 Days Off
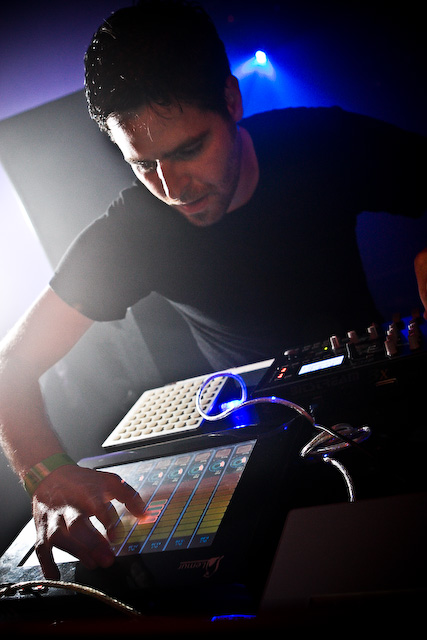
- Gui Boratto 2008
- Genre: Electronic dance music
- Locations: Ghent, Belgium; Amsterdam, The Netherlands
- Years active: 1995–2014
- Founders: Rudy Ackaert + Eric Smout + Philip De Liser

10 Days Off was an electronic music festival held in Ghent, Belgium. It began in 1995 as a 10-day-long Belgian celebration of techno music and grew to be a yearly club event until 2014. In 2001, the Amsterdam-based spin-off music and arts festival called 05 Days Off had its inaugural edition.

== See also ==
- List of electronic music festivals
