= Yizhong Street =

Street in Taichung, Taiwan

Coordinates: 24.1471°N 120.6858°E

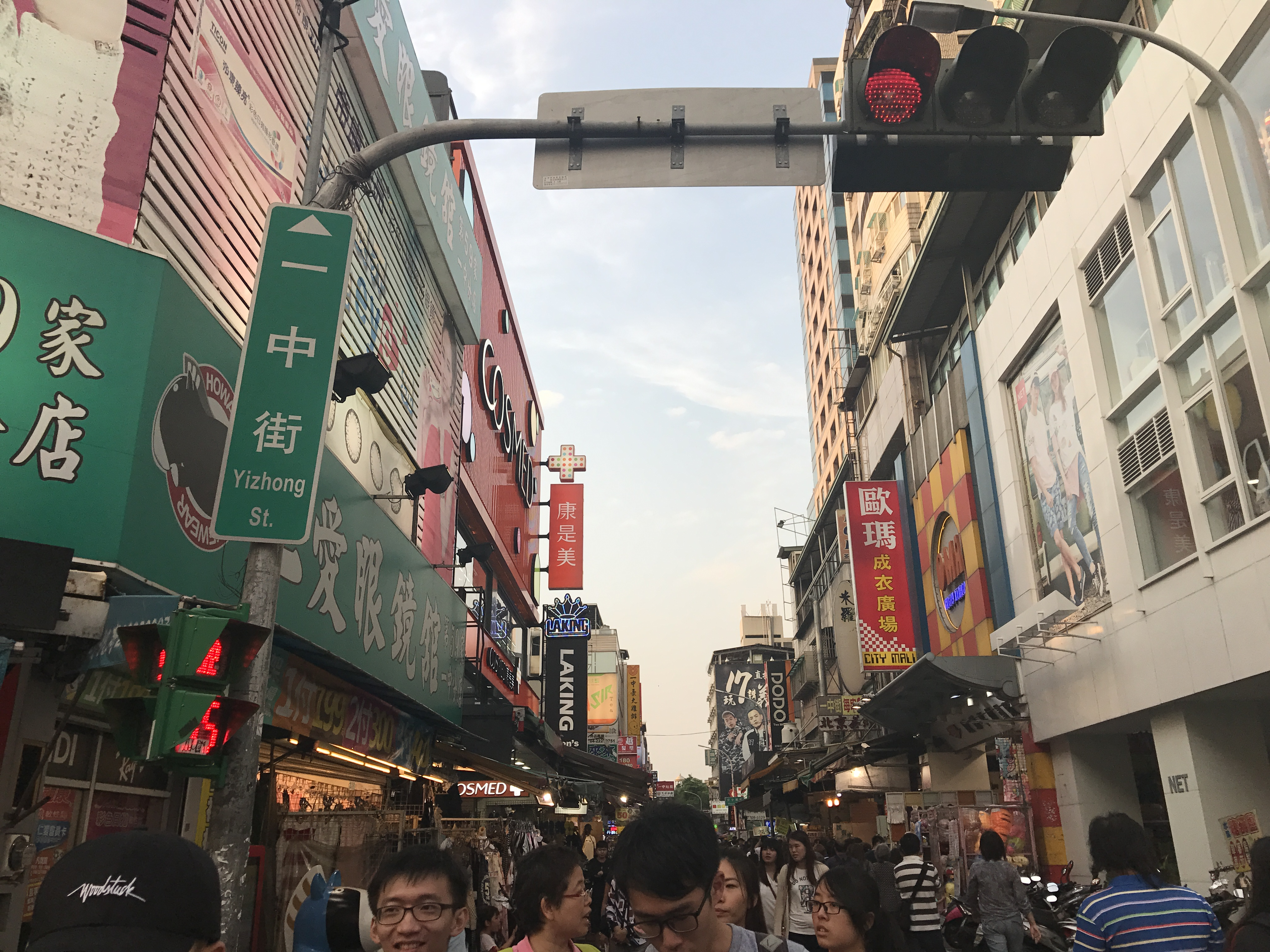
- Interactive map of Yizhong Street
- Native name: 一中商圈 (Chinese)
- Type: Street
- Location: North Taichung, Taiwan

Yizhong Street (Chinese: 一中商圈; pinyin: Yī Zhōng Shāng Quān) is a pedestrian street located in North District, Taichung, Taiwan. It is located between Sanmin Rd. (三民路), Yizhong St.(一中街), Taiping Rd.(太平路), Yucai St.(育才街), Yucai South St.(育才南街) and Yucai North St.(育才北街). In 2006, according to the survey conducted by National Chung Hsing University, it is elected as the most popular shopping area in Taichung.

== Characteristics ==
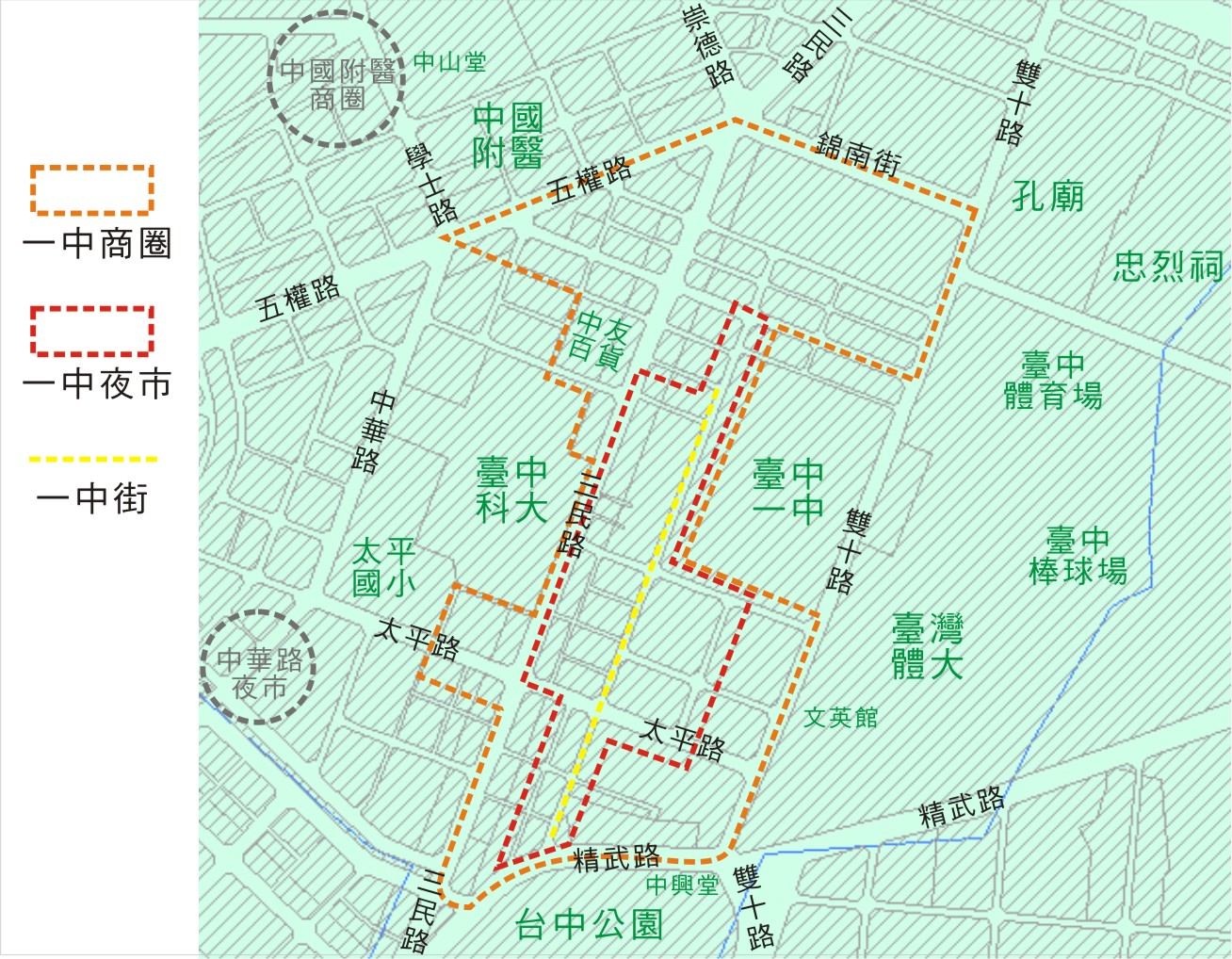
Yizhong Street(Yellow);Yizhong Night market(red);Yizhong commercial district(orange).

Yizhong Street is a shopping area and night market near many cultural and educational institutions: Taichung Municipal Taichung First Senior High School, National Taichung University of Science and Technology, National Taiwan University of Sport, the former National Library of Public Information, ChungHsing Hall (中興堂), Taichung Park, etc.

There are many cram schools located in the Yizhong shopping area, the shopping area has in turn attracted more crowds and expanded rapidly in recent years. At night many food and merchandise stalls open up along Yizhong Street and it becomes a de facto night market, often getting very crowded. Along with Chungyo Department Store(中友百貨) located next to National Taichung University of Science and Technology, the entire shopping area has become one of the most popular locations for locals to shop and eat.

Many of the stores sell similar merchandise in Yizhong Shopping area, so due to the competition, the prices here are much cheaper in comparison with other areas of Taichung.

== Transportation ==
The street is accessible by bus from Taichung Station of Taiwan Railway.

== See also ==
- List of tourist attractions in Taiwan
- List of roads in Taiwan
