= List of botanical gardens in Taiwan =

Botanical gardens in Taiwan have collections consisting entirely of Taiwan native and endemic species; most have a collection that include plants from around the world. There are botanical gardens and arboreta in all states and territories of Taiwan. Most are administered by local governments, while some are privately owned.

- Chiayi Botanical Garden, Chiayi
- Taipei Botanical Garden, Taipei
- Taichung Botanical Garden, Taichung
