= Chungyo Department Store =

Shopping mall in North, Taichung, Taiwan

- 中友百貨公司

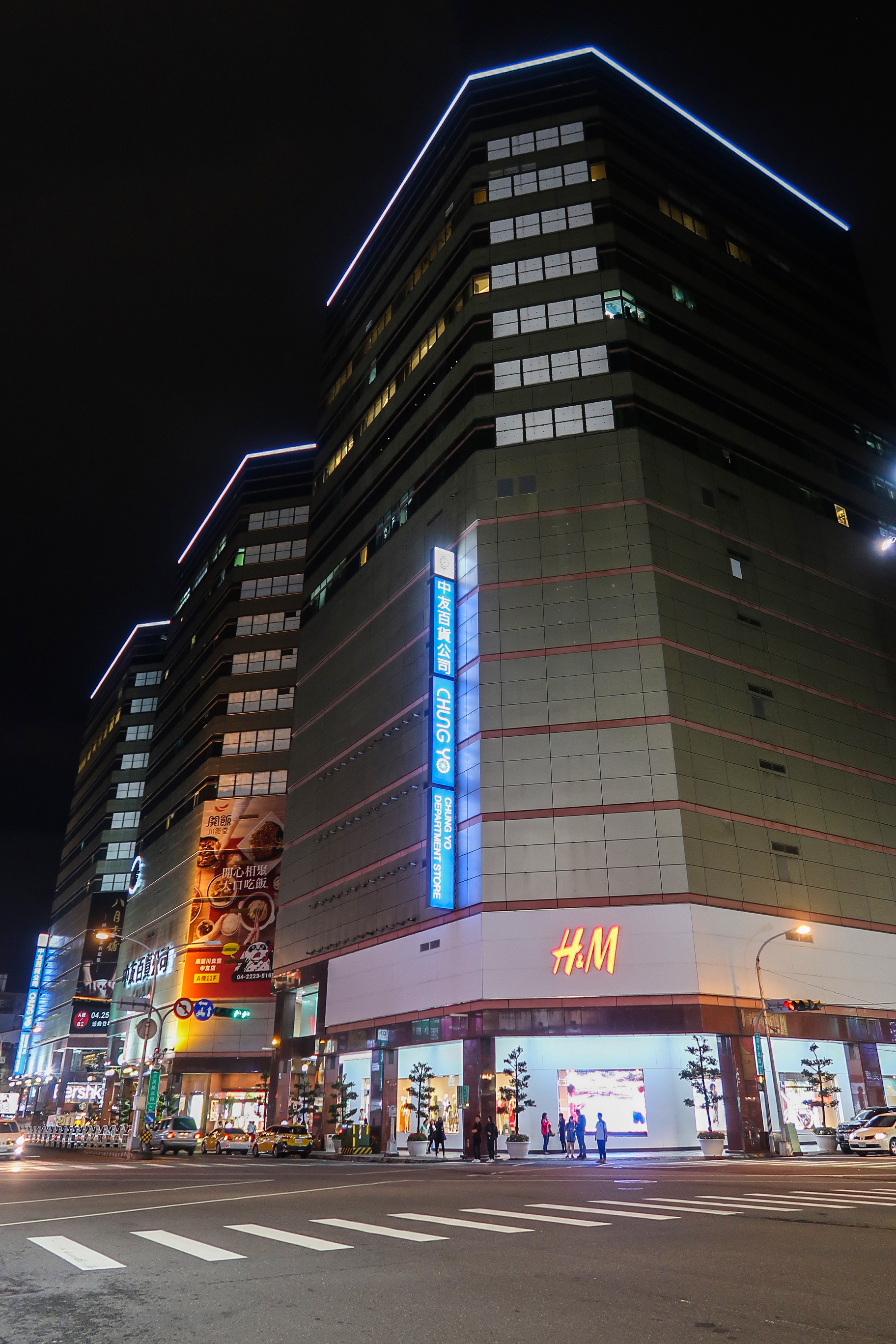
- Location: No. 161, Section 3, Sanmin Road, North District, Taichung, Taiwan
- Coordinates: 24.152403287633717°N 120.68485809939234°E
- Opened: 30 April 1992
- Floor area: 89,100 m^{2} (959,000 sq ft)
- Floors: 15 above ground 3 below ground
- Parking: 2000
- Website: https://www.chungyo.com.tw/

The Chungyo Department Store (Chinese: 中友百貨公司) is a shopping mall in North District, Taichung, Taiwan that opened on 30 April 1992. With a total floor area of 89,100 m^{2} (959,000 sq ft) and 2,000 parking spaces, the mall has 15 floors above ground and three basement levels. Main core stores include Muji, Eslite Bookstore, Uniqlo, H&M, Jasons Market Place and various themed restaurants. The lavatories of the mall were featured on a list of the world's top 10 public restrooms by the UK-based Cheapflights website.

== History ==
- On April 30, 1992, Chungyo Department Store officially opened.
- On February 24, 1997, stocks began to be publicly traded on the over-the-counter market.
- In 1999, a joint venture with a Japanese company established Chungyo Department Store in Beijing. However, due to problems such as losses, another mainland-funded group took over the operation.
- On December 26, 2006, stocks ceased to be publicly traded on the over-the-counter market.
- On January 9, 2009, the family card was officially issued.
- On September 3, 2010, Chungyo Restaurant (formerly P.S. Popular Hall) opened.
- On March 1, 2011, the Chungyo Titanium Travel Co-branded Card was officially issued.

== Incident ==
On 25 June 2018, an 18-year old teenager named Chen leapt from 14th floor of Chungyo Department Store. Seven emergency vehicles carrying 25 firefighters and paramedics were immediately dispatched to the scene. When rescuers arrived on the scene, they found the young man had smashed through the ceiling of the first-floor cosmetics department and landed on a counter on the first floor. Paramedics found that he was initially showing no vital signs and immediately rushed him to China Medical University Hospital for emergency treatment.

== Gallery ==
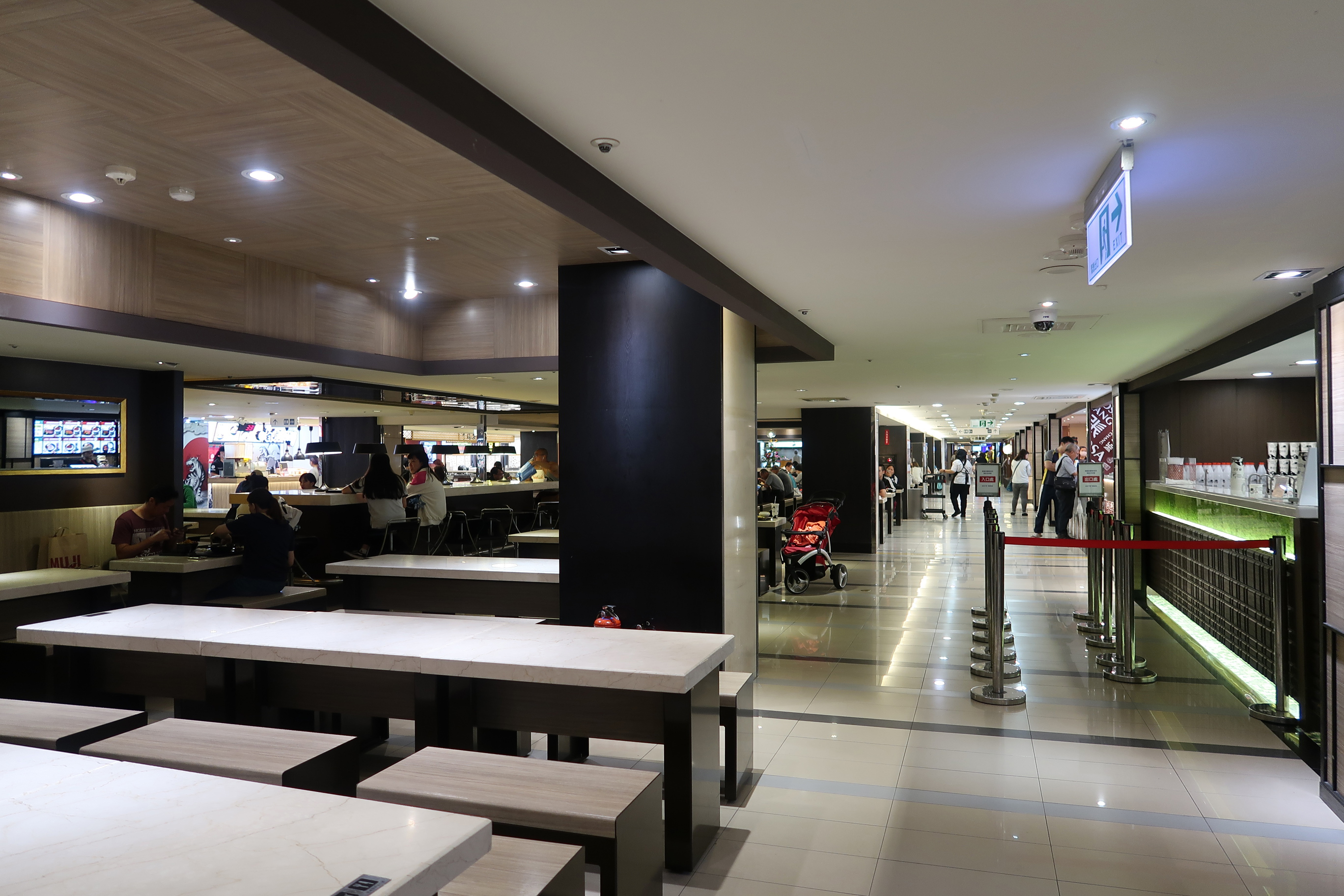
B3 Food Court

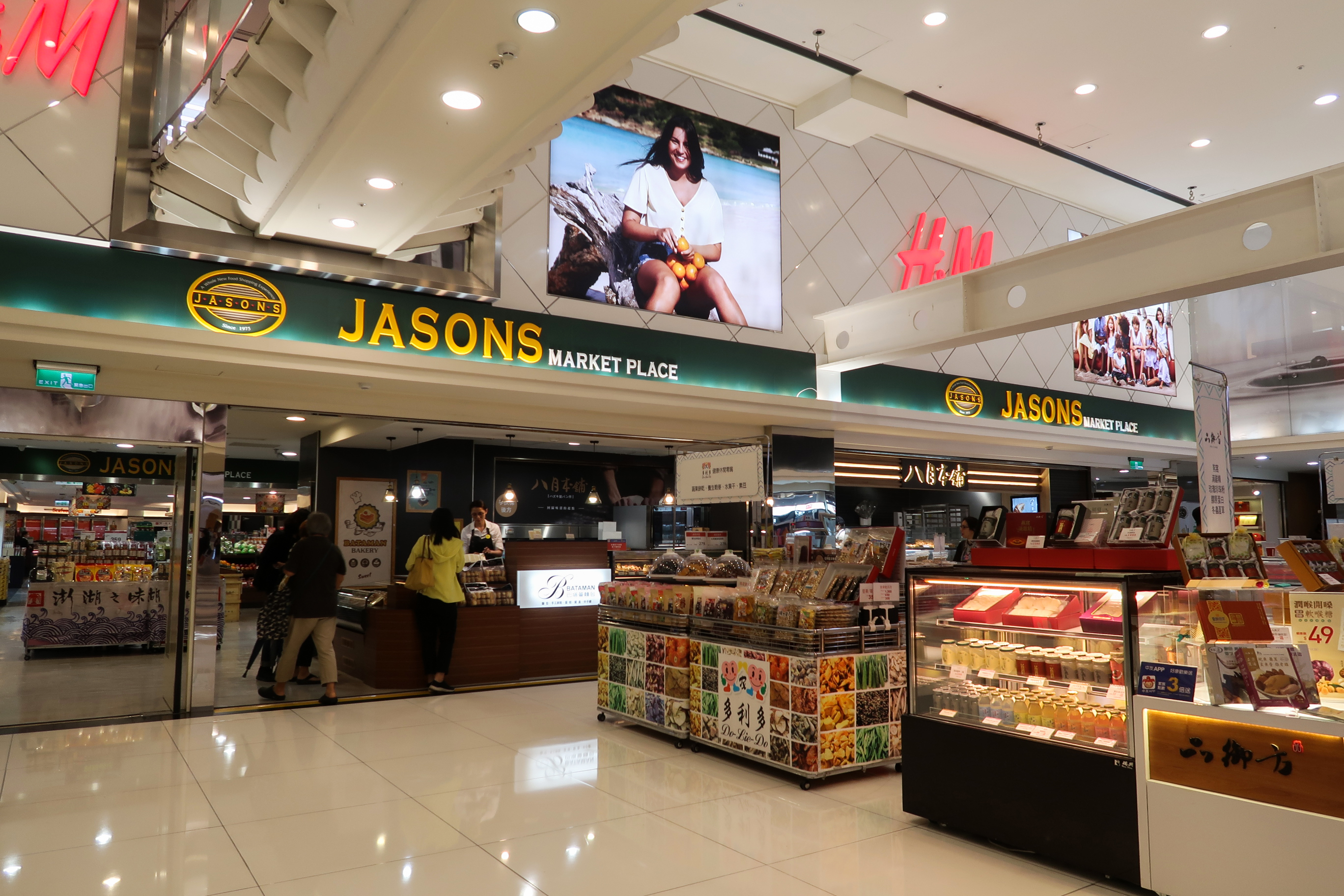
B3 Jasons Market Place

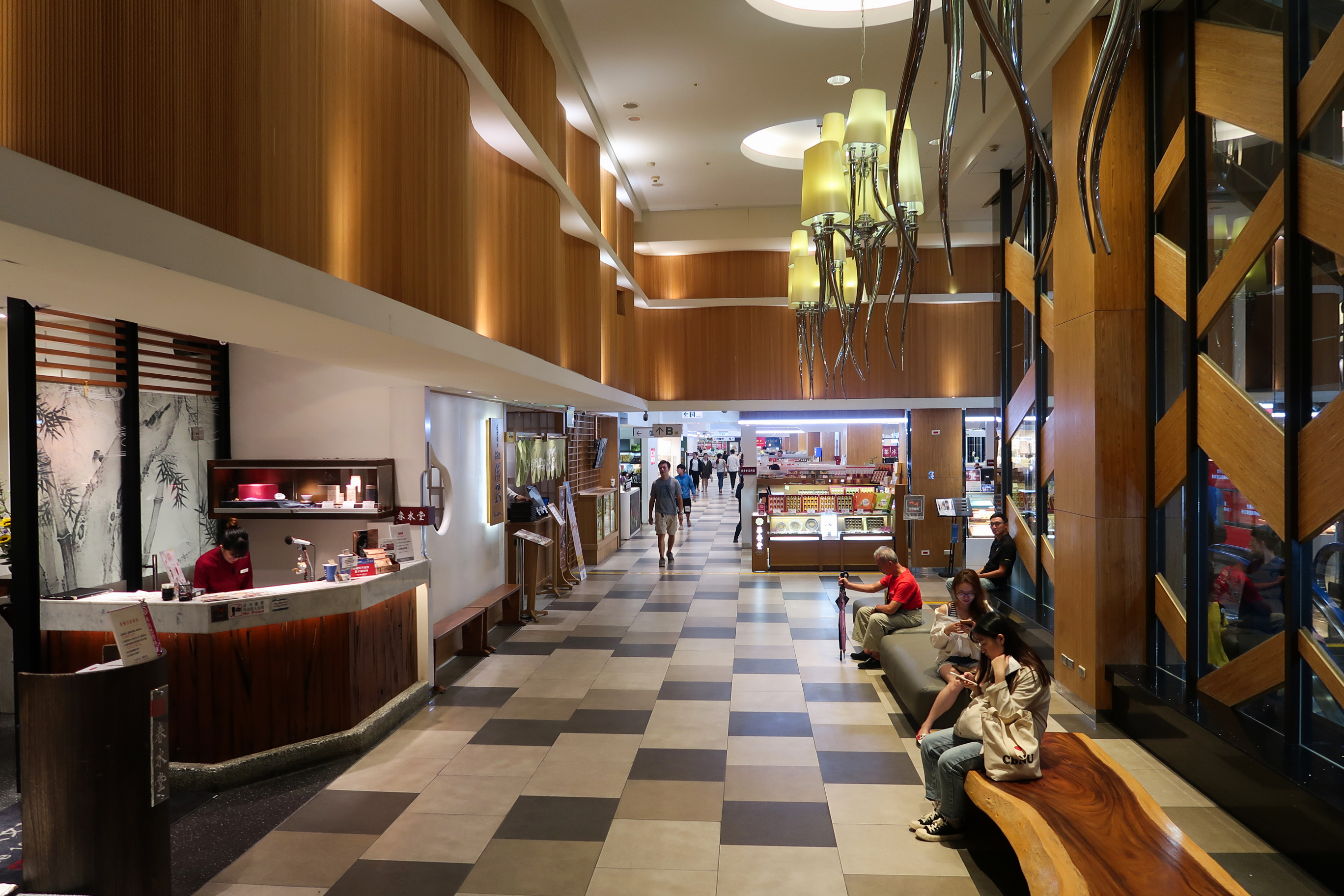
Level B2

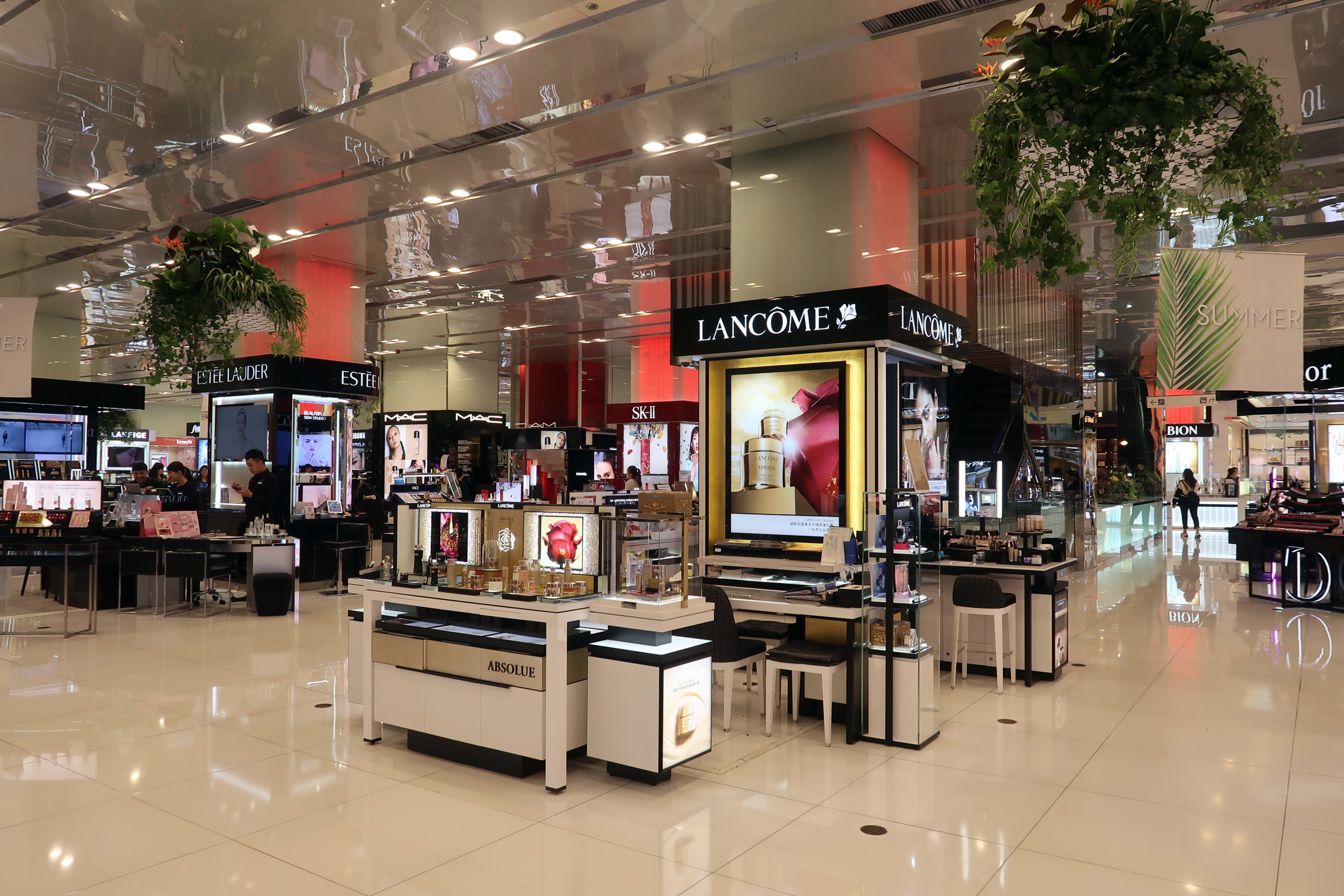
1st Story

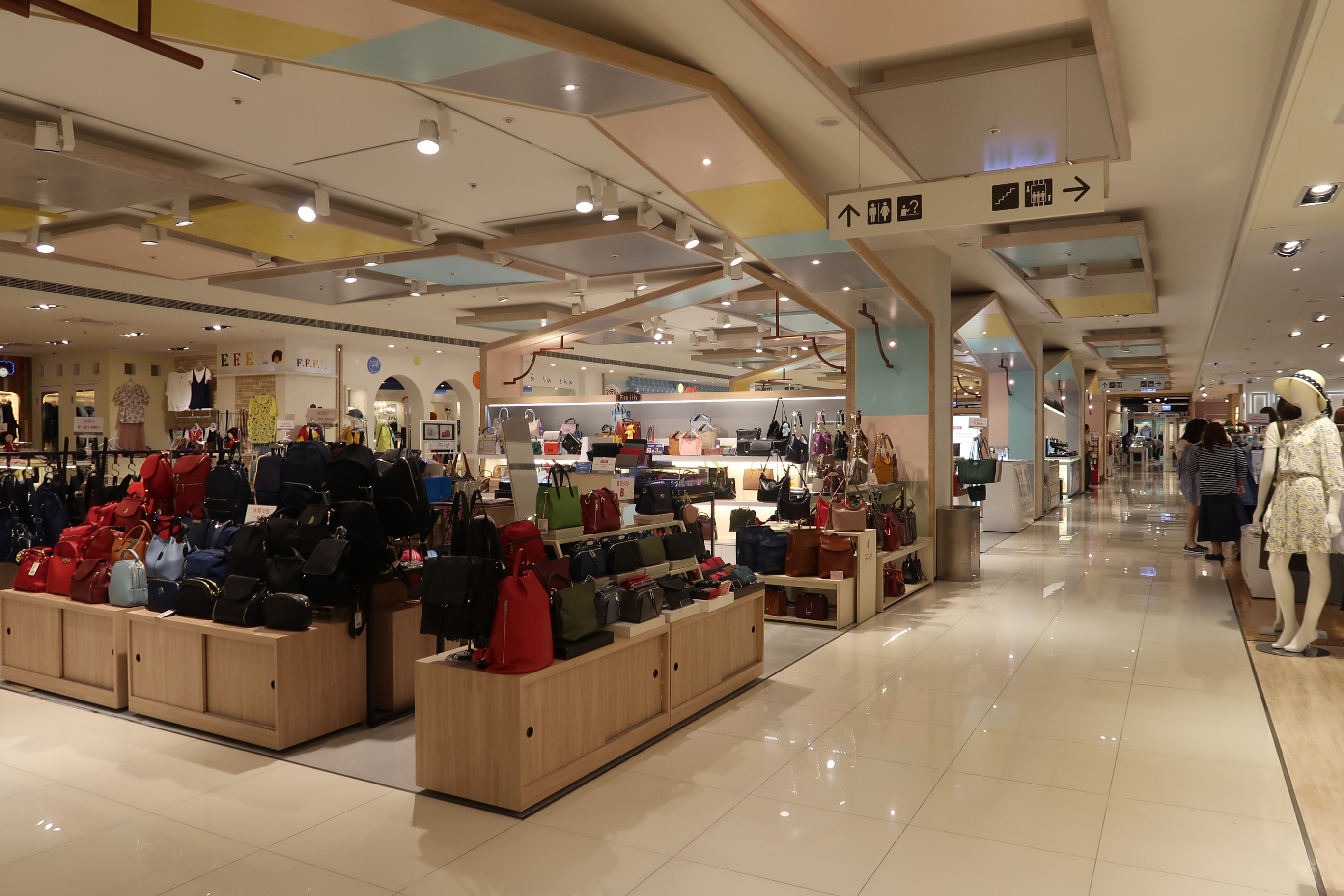
3rd Story

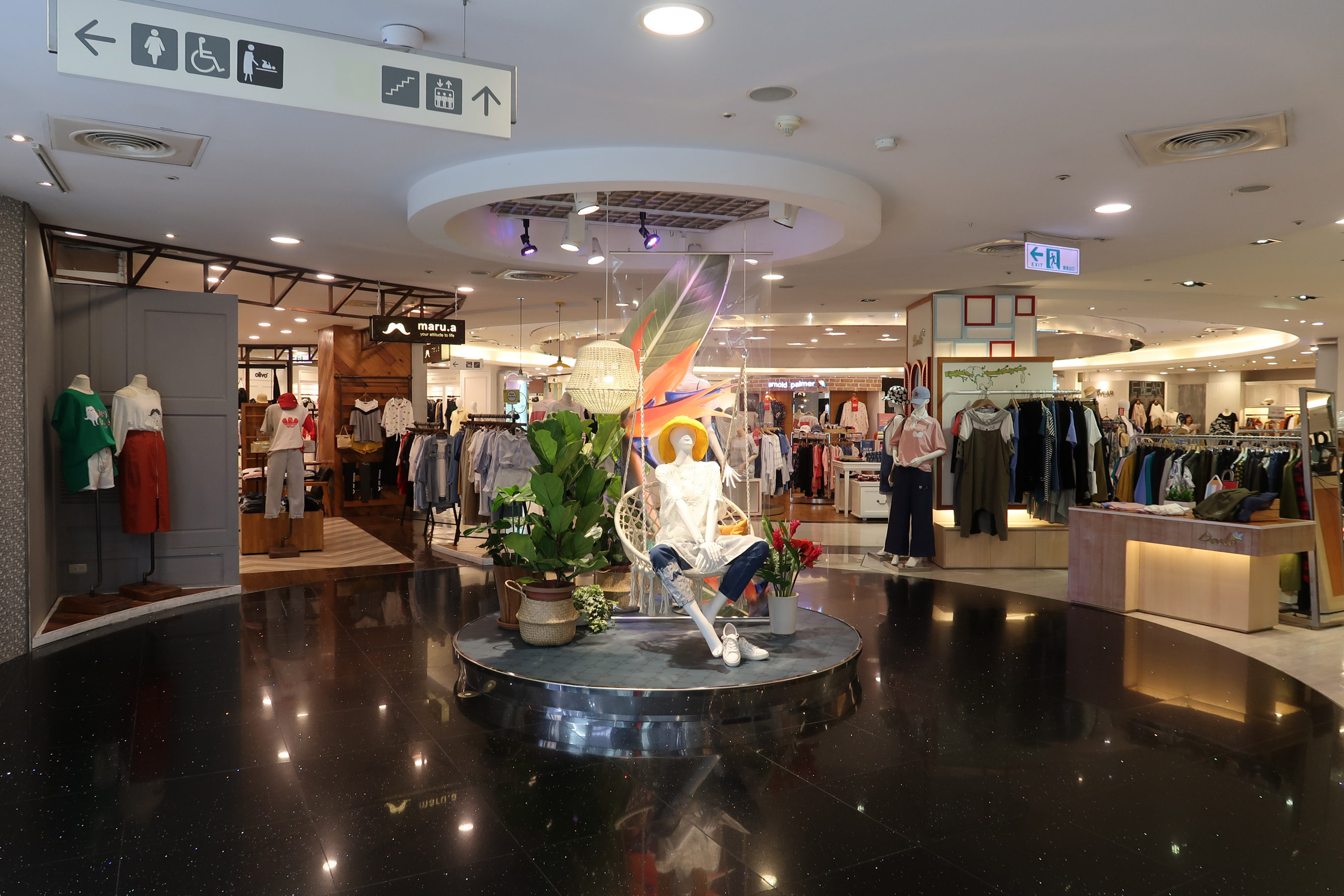
4th Story

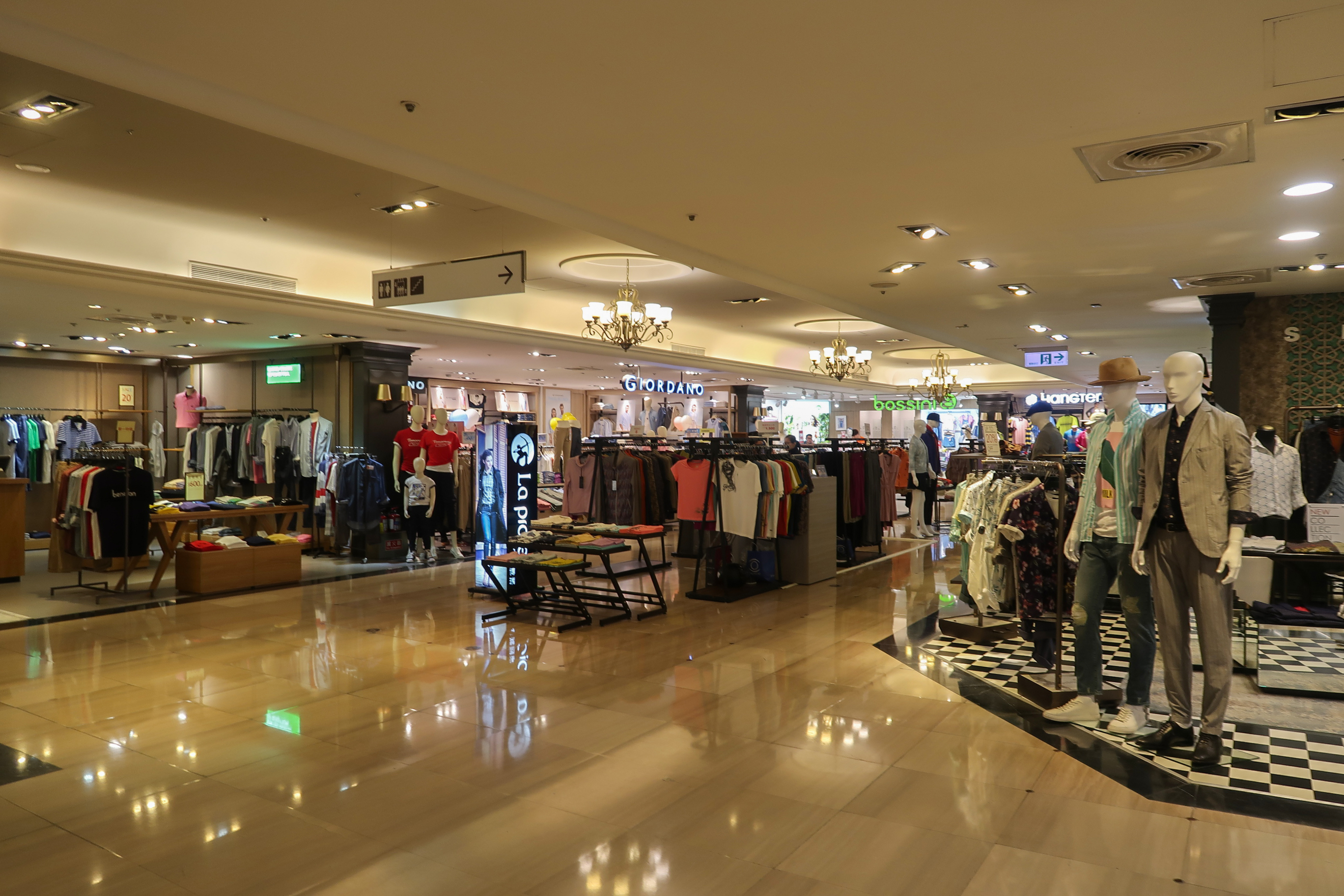
6th Story

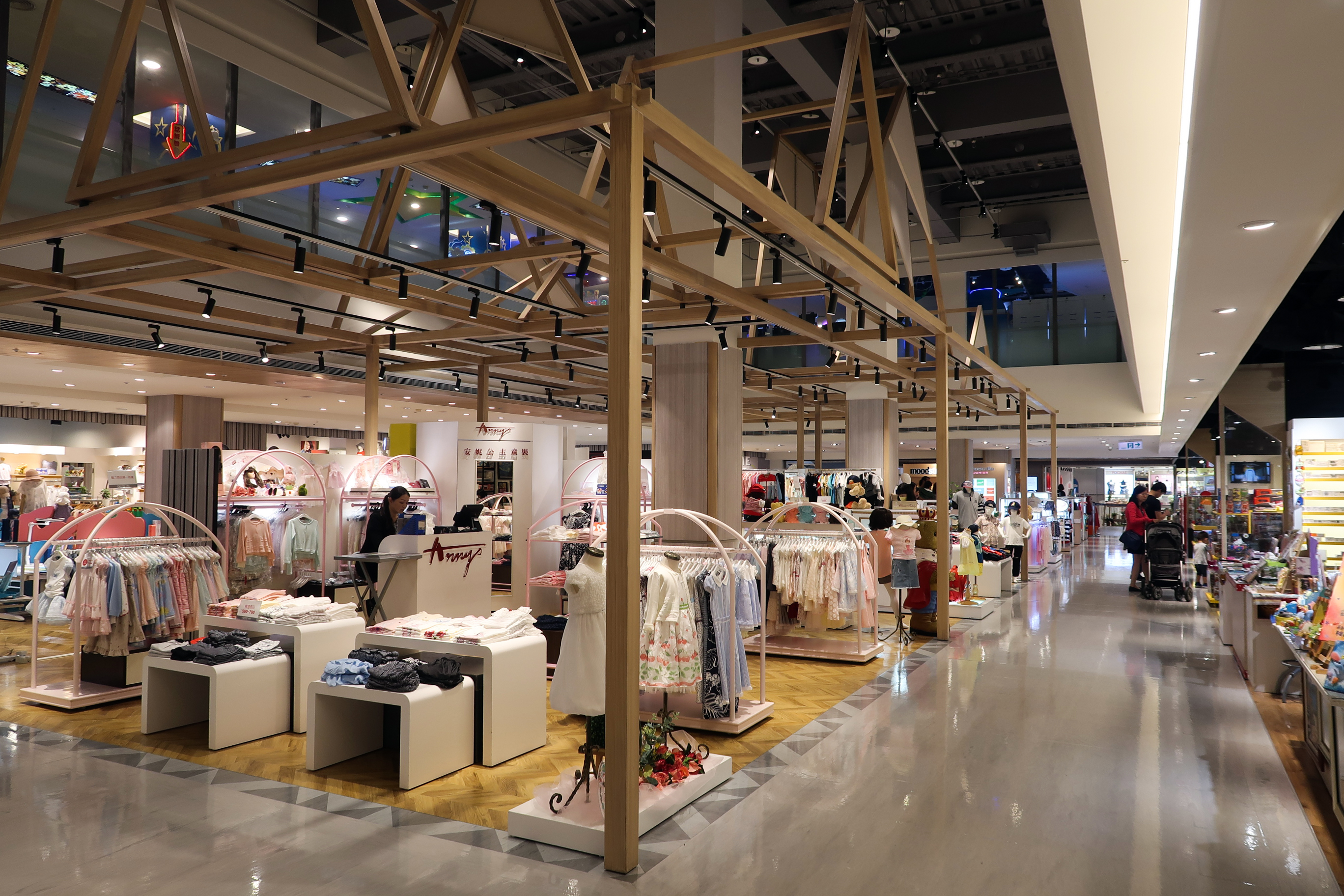
7th Story

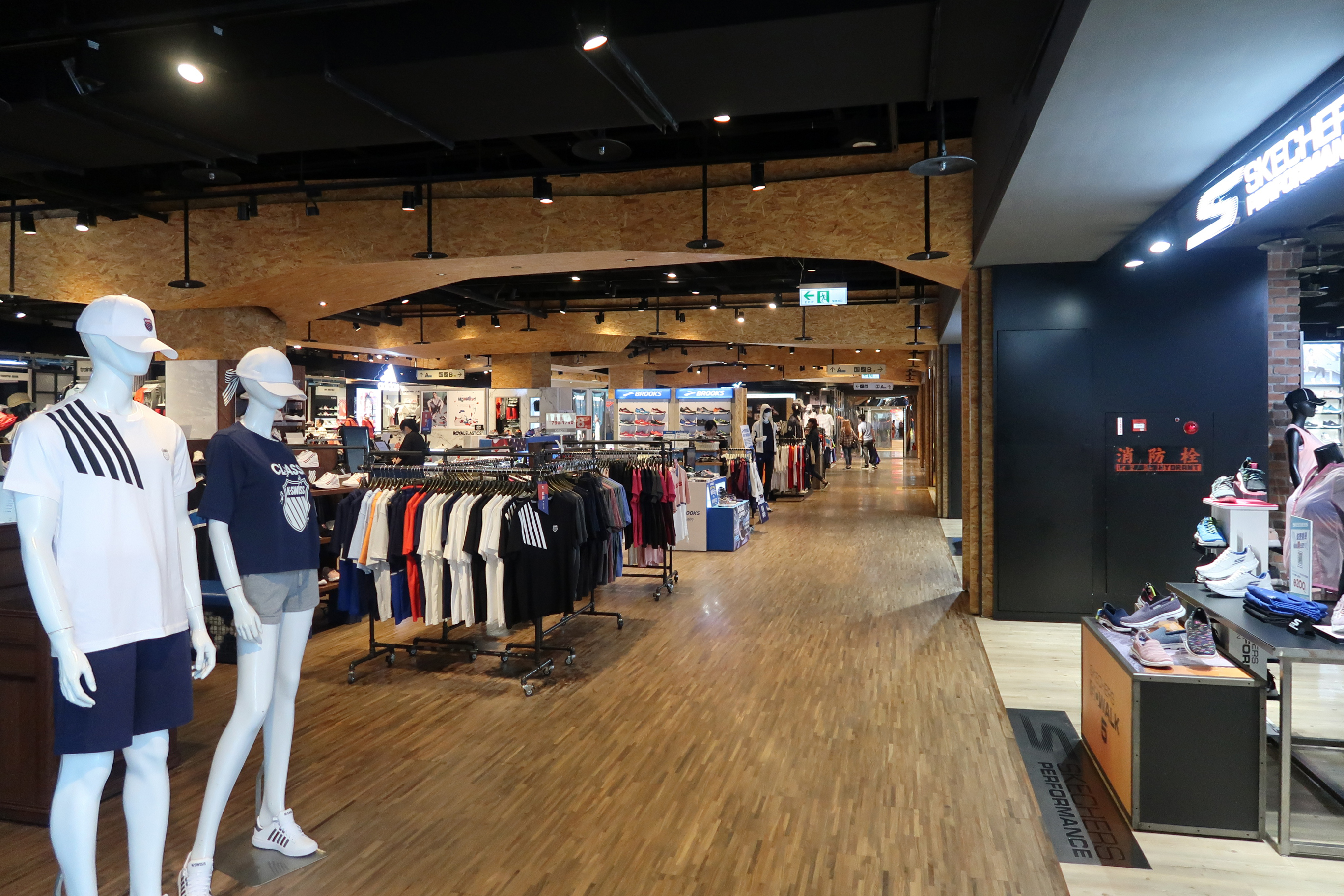
9th Story

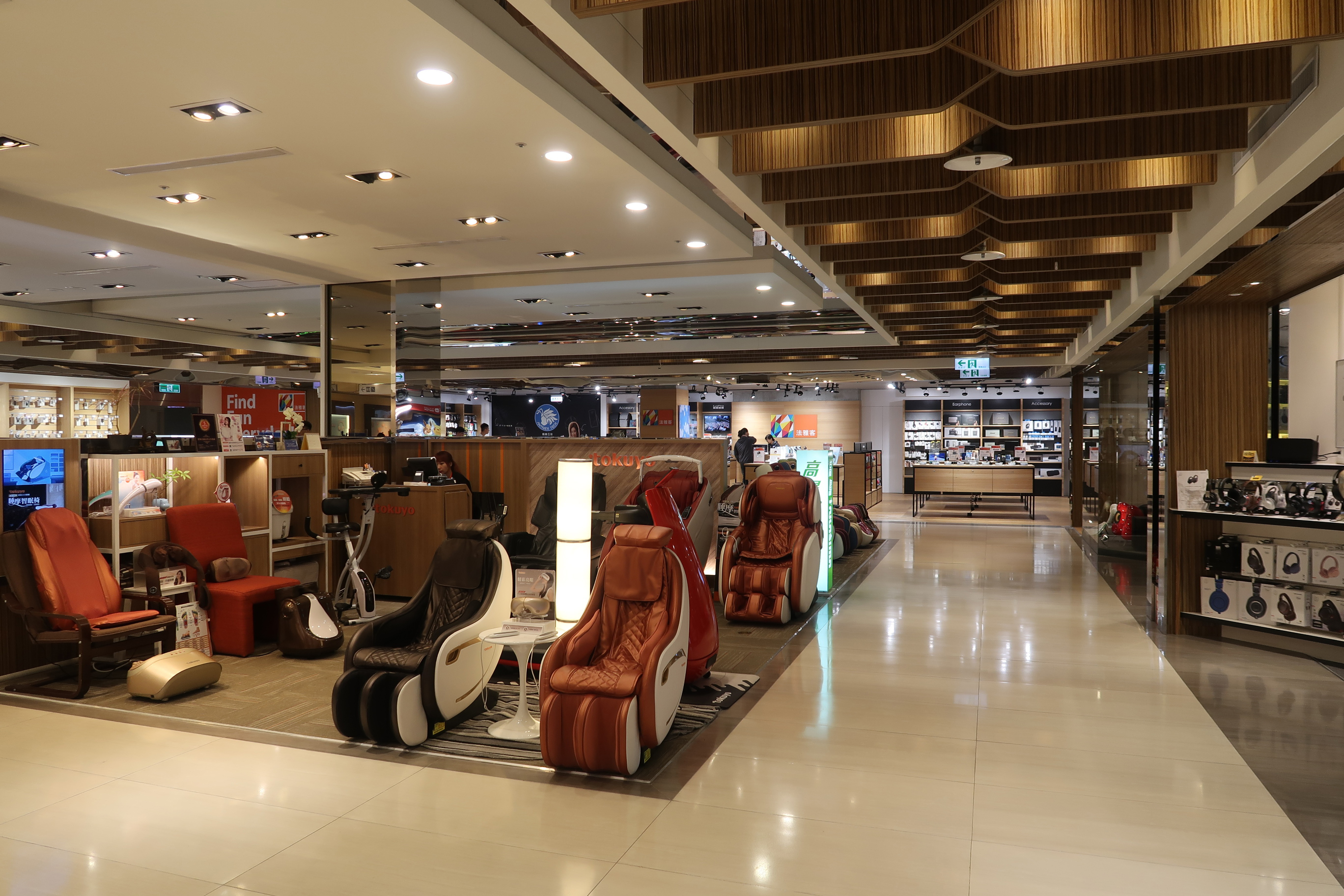
10th Story

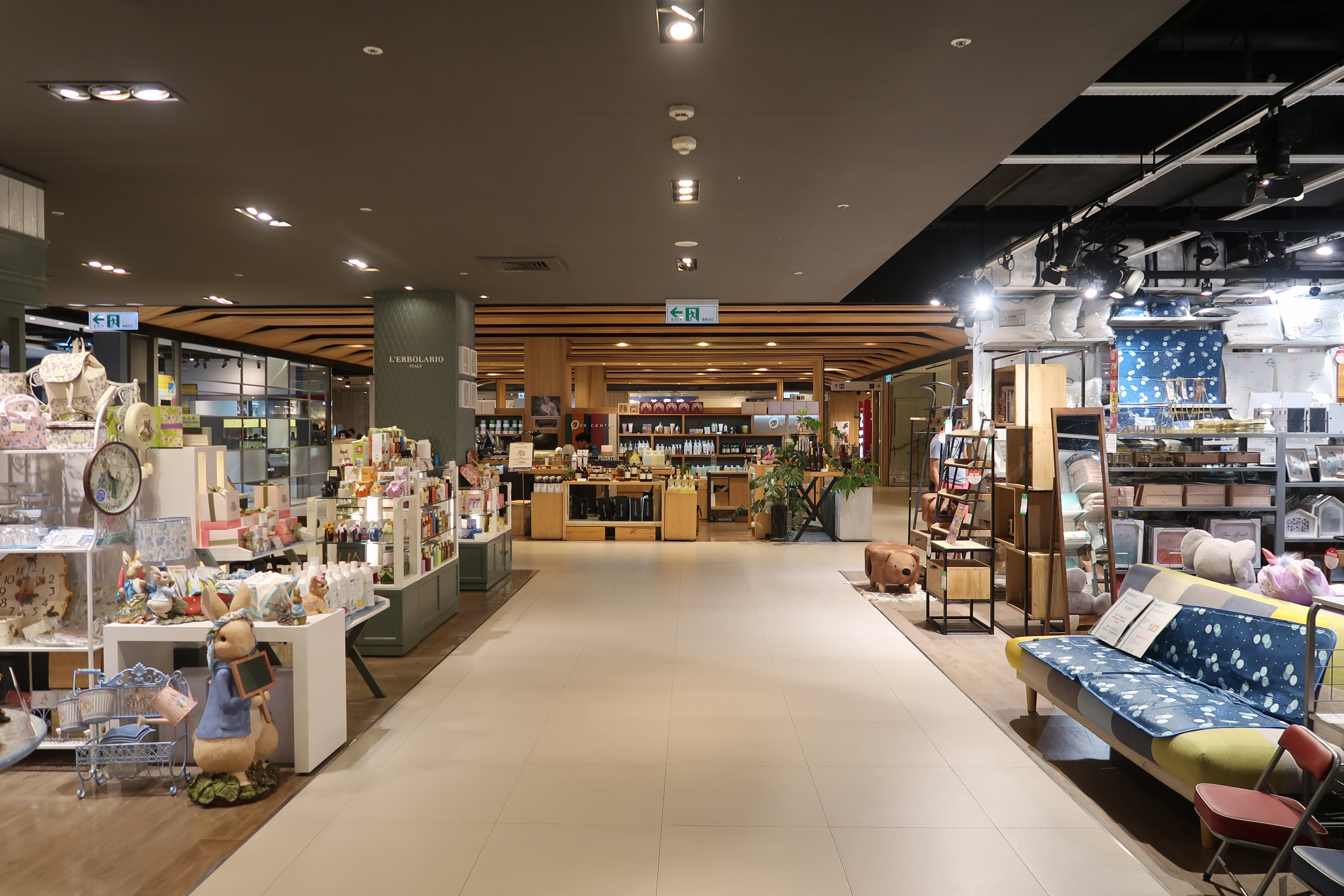
12th Story

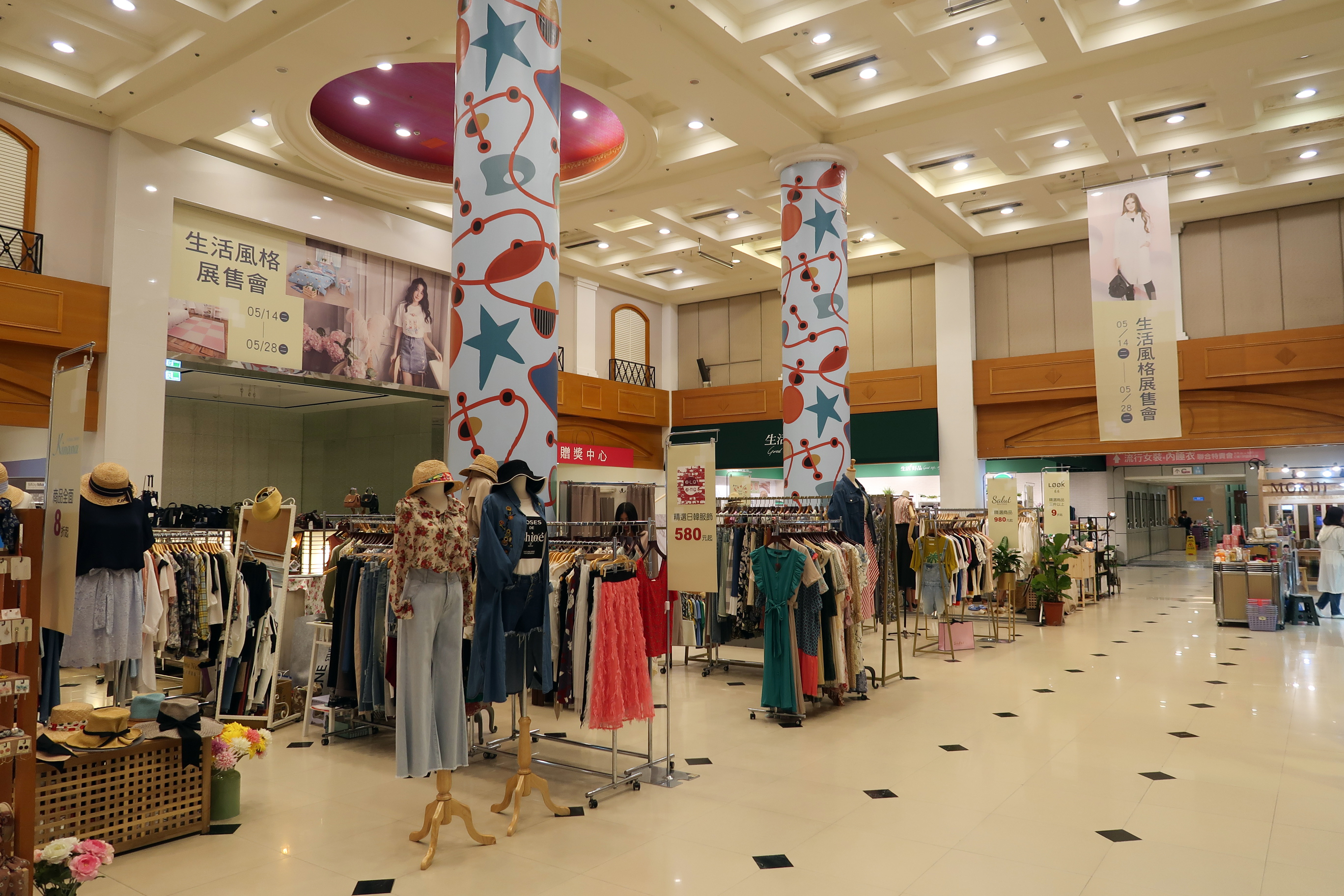
13 Story

== See also ==
- List of tourist attractions in Taiwan
