= Chen Mao-nan =

Taiwanese politician

Chen Mao-nan MLY
- 陳茂男

Member of the Legislative Yuan
- In office 1 February 2002 – 31 January 2005
- Constituency: Taipei County 2

Personal details
- Born: 23 May 1941 (age 85)
- Party: Democratic Progressive Party
- Education: National Taichung Junior College of Commerce; Chinese Culture University
- Occupation: politician

Chen Mao-nan (Chinese: 陳茂男; pinyin: Chén Màonán; born 23 May 1941) is a Taiwanese politician who served on the Legislative Yuan from 2002 to 2005.

== Education ==
Chen attended National Taichung Junior College of Commerce and later commenced graduate study at the Institute of Tourism of Chinese Culture University.

== Political career ==
Chen was elected to the National Assembly in 1991 and 1996. Upon stepping down from the National Assembly in 2000, Chen contested the Legislative Yuan elections of 2001. While serving on the Legislative Yuan, Chen maintained an interest in banking and finance. In the midst of the 2003 SARS outbreak, Chen pushed for the World Health Organization to offer Taiwan observer status. He was placed on the Democratic Progressive Party list for the 2008 legislative election, but was not elected via proportional representation.
