= Taichung Mayor's House =

Former residence in North, Taichung, Taiwan

- 台中市長公館
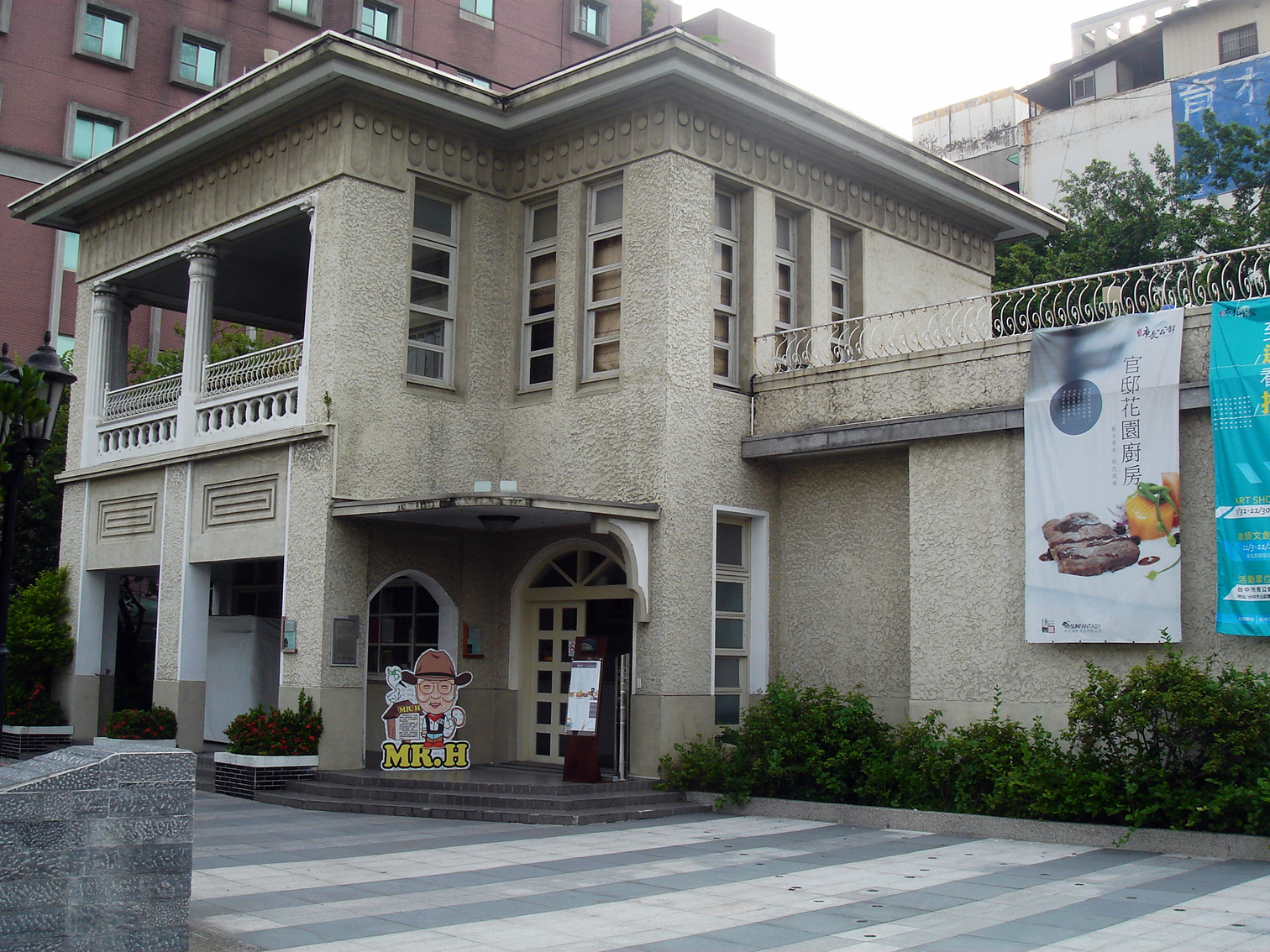
- Interactive map of the Taichung Mayor's House area

General information
- Type: former official residence
- Architectural style: Japanese
- Location: North, Taichung, Taiwan
- Coordinates: 24°08′55.4″N 120°41′12.5″E
- Completed: 1929
- Inaugurated: 2004

The Taichung Mayor's House (traditional Chinese: 台中市長公館; simplified Chinese: 台中市长公馆; pinyin: Táizhōng Shìzhǎng Gōngguǎn) is a former residence of Taichung Mayor in North District, Taichung, Taiwan.

== History ==
The building was originally built in 1929 for Japanese optometrist Miyahara Takeo under the name Miyahara Residence. After the handover of Taiwan from Japan to the Republic of China, the building became the property of Taichung City Government and housed the official residence of Taichung Mayor. In 2002, the residence was declared a historical building. In 2004, the Cultural Affairs Bureau of the city government converted into a public arts and cultural center for exhibitions and performances.

== Architecture ==
The building is a Japanese-style mansion consists of two floors.

== Transportation ==
The building is accessible within walking distance north of Taichung Station of Taiwan Railway.

== See also ==
- Mayor of Taichung
