= Taichung Broadcasting Bureau =

Former radio station in North, Taichung, Taiwan

- 臺中放送局
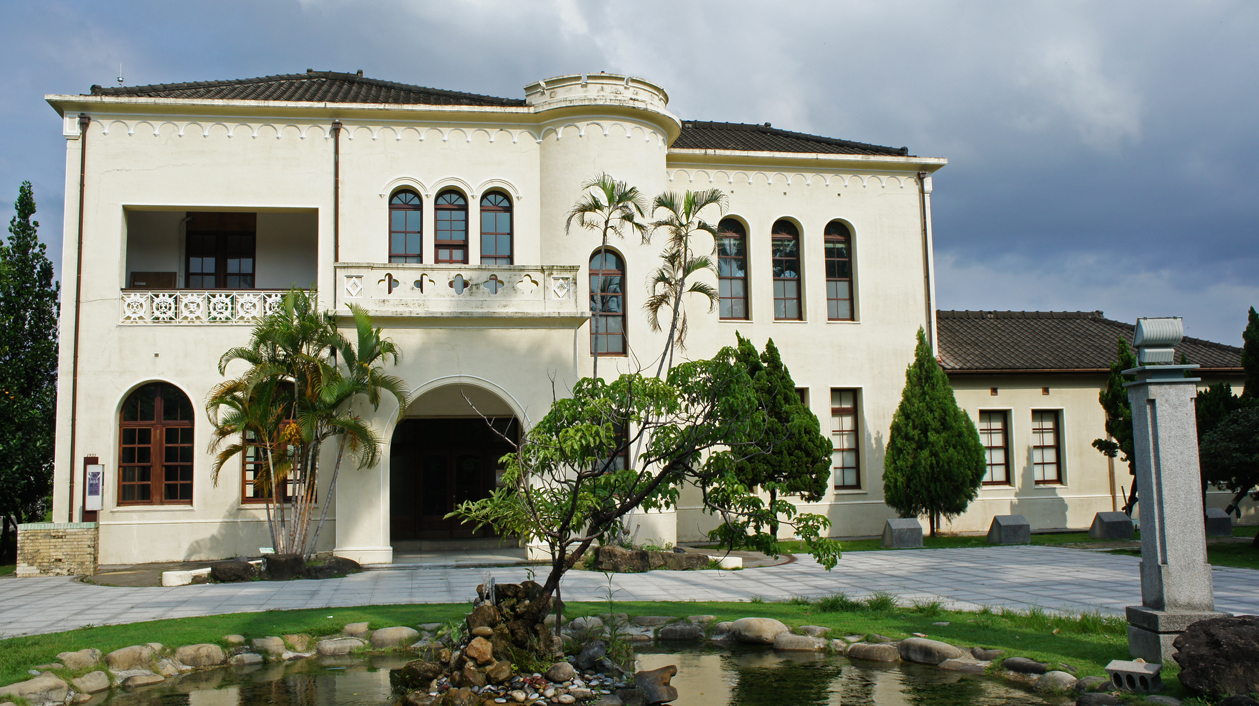
- Interactive map of the Taichung Broadcasting Bureau area

General information
- Type: former radio station
- Location: North, Taichung, Taiwan
- Coordinates: 24°08′59.7″N 120°41′26.3″E
- Opened: 11 May 1935

The Taichung Broadcasting Bureau (traditional Chinese: 臺中放送局; simplified Chinese: 台中放送局; pinyin: Táizhōng Fàngsòng Jú) is a former radio station in North District, Taichung, Taiwan.

== History ==
The station building was opened on 11 May 1935 as the third radio station in Taiwan during the Japanese rule to broadcast radio and news to central Taiwan. In 2015, the @STUDIO obtained the rights to manage and operate the building.

== Exhibitions ==
The station regularly exhibits design, photography, music and culture.

== Transportation ==
The station is accessible within walking distance north of Taichung Station of Taiwan Railway.

== See also ==
- List of tourist attractions in Taiwan
