= Wen Ying Hall =

Cultural center in North, Taichung, Taiwan

- 文英館
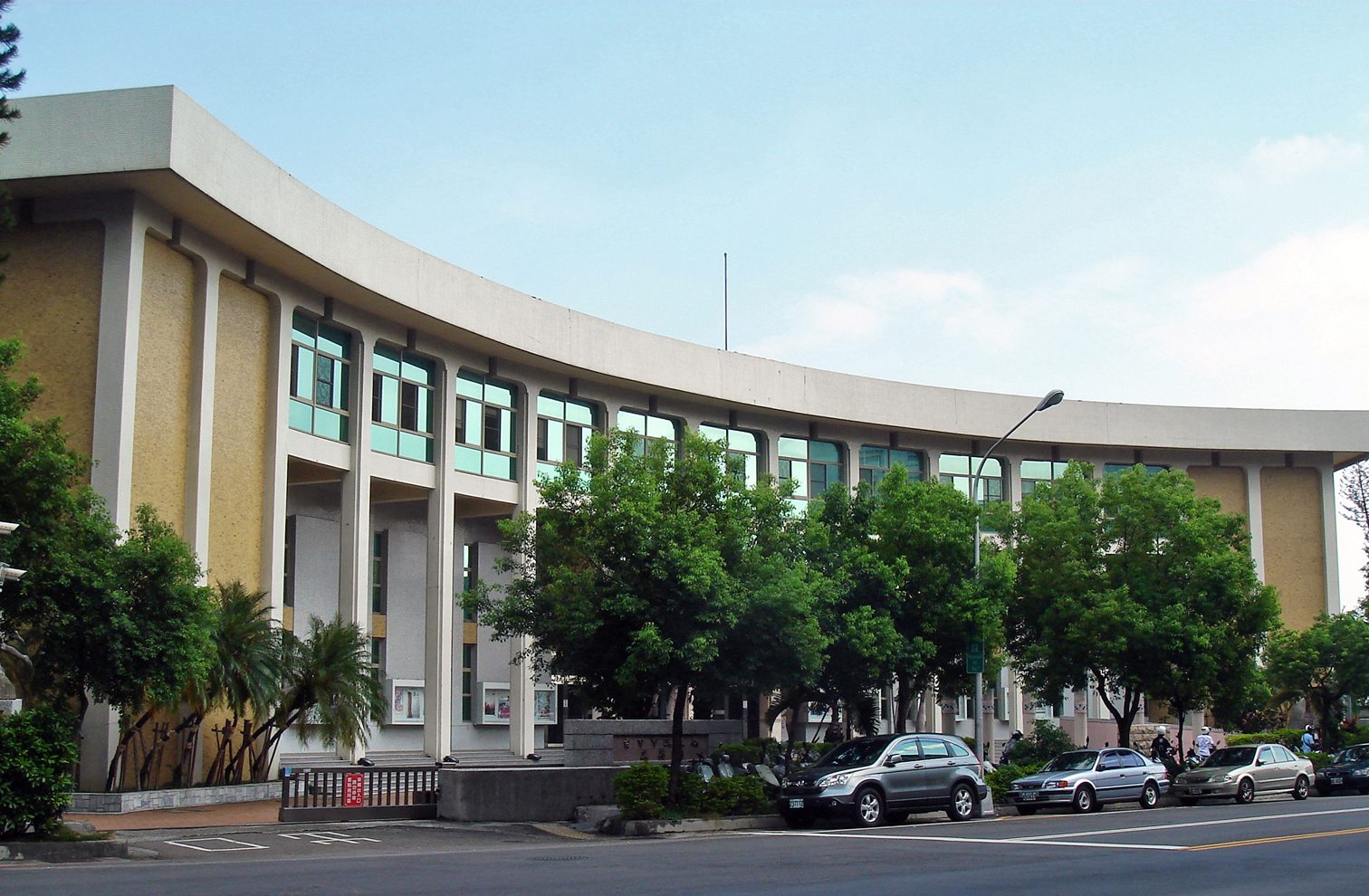
- Interactive map of the Wen Ying Hall area

General information
- Type: cultural center
- Location: North, Taichung, Taiwan
- Coordinates: 24°08′51.0″N 120°41′12.8″E
- Opened: October 1976
- Owner: Cultural Affairs Bureau of Taichung City Government

Technical details
- Floor area: 4,710 m^{2}

The Wen Ying Hall (traditional Chinese: 文英館; simplified Chinese: 文英馆; pinyin: Wényīng Guǎn) is a cultural center in North District, Taichung, Taiwan.

== History ==
The center was established in October 1976 by entrepreneur He Yong and funded by the Taichung Wen Ying Foundation. In 1997, the second floor of the building was converted into the Special Exhibition Room for Traditional Taiwan Block Print.

== Architecture ==
The design of the building is a mix blend between western and Chinese style. The building consists of Zhunzheng Auditorium, Traditional Taiwanese Woodblock Prints Special Collections Room, Wen Ying Gallery and Training Room.

== Exhibition ==
The center houses more than 3,000 pieces of cultural and folk artifacts.

== Transportation ==
The hall is accessible within walking distance north of Taichung Station of Taiwan Railway.

== See also ==
- List of tourist attractions in Taiwan
