= National Taichung University of Science and Technology =

University in Taichung, Taiwan

- 國立臺中科技大學
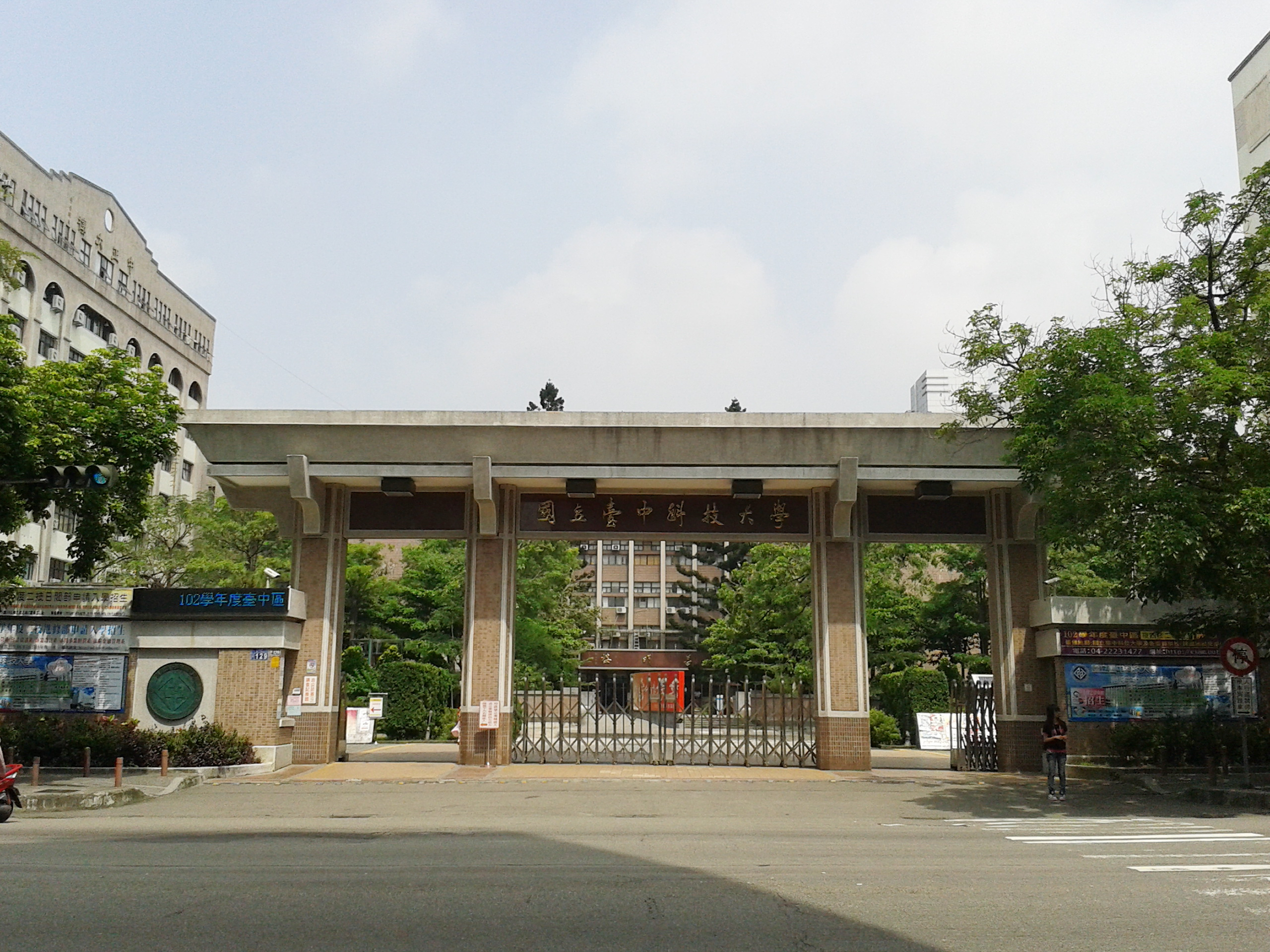
- National Taichung University of Science and Technology
- Former names: National Taichung Institute of Technology, National Taichung Nursing College
- Motto: 遠大密微(pinyin: yuǎn dà mì wéi; Pe̍h-ōe-jī: Oán-tāi bi̍t-bî)
- Motto in English: Broad, Dense, and Micro
- Type: Public (National)
- Established: Founded 1919 as Taichung Public School of Commerce in Taiwan Merged with National Taichung Nursing College in 2011
- President: Lee, Tsung-Po (李淙柏)
- Academic staff: Full Time: 413 Total: 986
- Students: 15,916
- Undergraduates: 15,274
- Postgraduates: 424
- Location: Bei, Taichung, Taiwan; 24.150°N 120.683°E
- Campus: Urban, 14.66012 hectares (San-min and Min-sheng Campus Combined)
- Website: www.nutc.edu.tw/bin/home.php

National Taichung University of Science and Technology
- Traditional Chinese: 國立臺中科技大學
Transcriptions
Standard Mandarin
- Hanyu Pinyin: Guólì Táizhōng Kējì Dàxué
Southern Min
- Hokkien POJ: Kok-li̍p Tâi-tiong Kho-ki Tāi-ha̍k

National Taichung University of Science and Technology (NTCUST; Chinese: 國立臺中科技大學; Pe̍h-ōe-jī: Kok-li̍p Tâi-tiong Kho-ki Tāi-ha̍k) is a technical vocational university located in North District, Taichung, Taiwan. In Taiwan it is also known as 台中科大 (pinyin: tái zhōng kē dà; Pe̍h-ōe-jī: Tâi-tiong Kho-tāi). The university began as two separate universities, National Taichung Institute of Technology (國立台中技術學院; Pe̍h-ōe-jī: Kok-li̍p Tâi-tiong Ki-su̍t Ha̍k-īⁿ) and National Taichung Nursing College (國立台中護理專科學校). The two schools merged on December 1, 2011 to form National Taichung University of Science and Technology. The San-min campus is located on Sanmin Rd. near Yizhong Street shopping area, while the Min-sheng campus, where the College of Health is located, is down the same road near Taichung Hospital. The academic division of the university is composed of five colleges and one committee.

== History ==
=== National Taichung Institute of Technology ===
National Taichung Institute of Technology (NTIT; Chinese: 國立台中技術學院) was founded as "Taichung Public School of Commerce in Taiwan" in 1919, while Taiwan was under Japanese rule. During this period the school went through a lot of development; new buildings were constructed and focus was placed on developing business professionals at the school. After the end of Japanese rule, the school was changed to a provincial vocational high school in commerce in 1945. In 1963, the school was upgraded to a junior college. In 1999, the school became National Taichung Institute of Technology (NTIT) and began to award undergraduate degrees to students, with master's degrees beginning in 2003 and more recently, after merging with National Taichung Nursing College in December 2011, the school became a comprehensive public university in science and technology.

=== National Taichung Nursing College ===
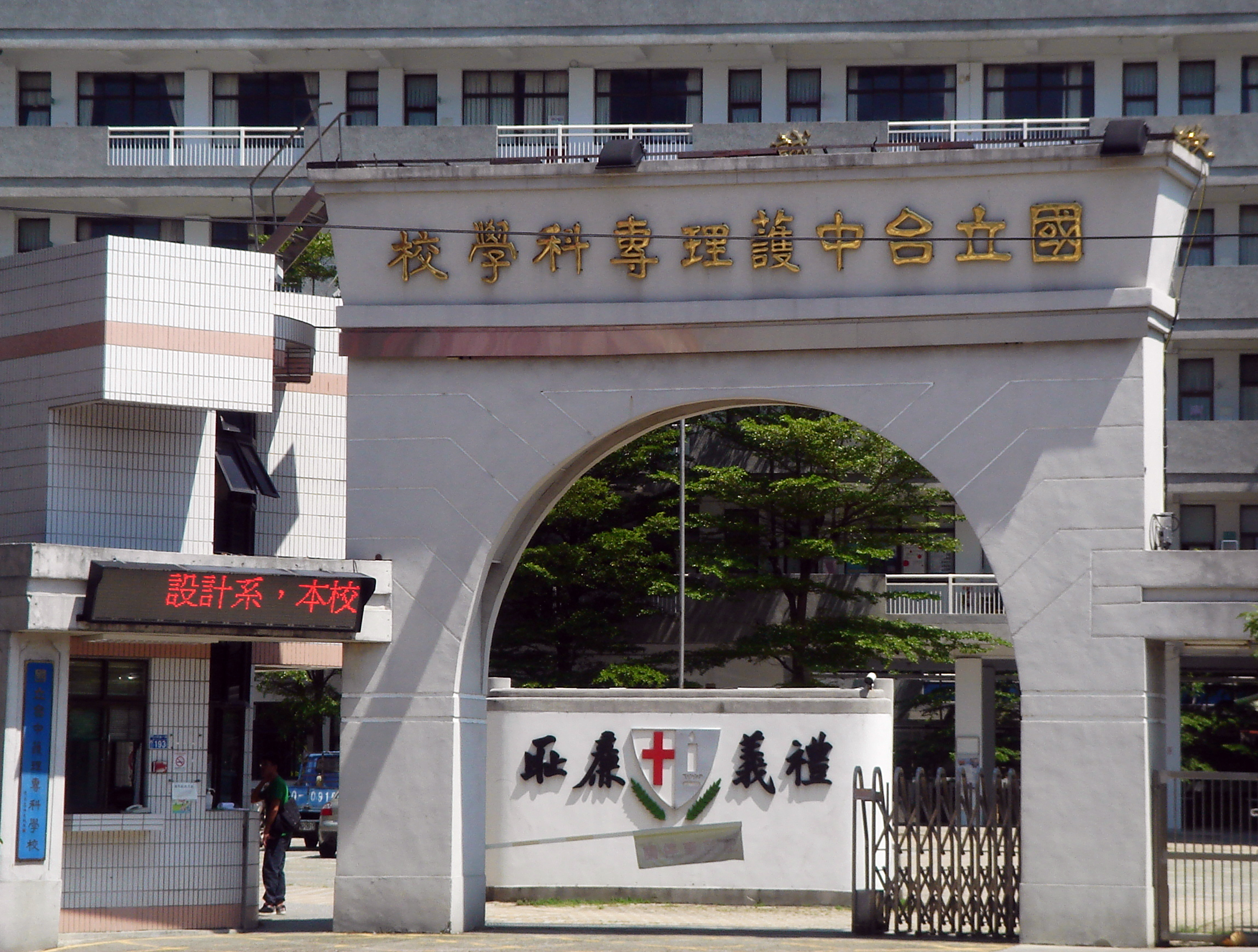
National Taichung Nursing College

National Taichung Nursing College (Chinese: 國立臺中護理專科學校; Pe̍h-ōe-jī: Kok-li̍p Tâi-tiong Hō͘-lí Choan-kho Ha̍k-hāu) was founded in 1955 as Taiwan Provincial Senior Nursing College, with a 3-year nursing program. In 1997 the college acquired 8 hectares of land in Nantun District. In 2002, the college was named National Taichung Nursing College. After the merging with National Taichung Institute of Technology, the nursing college became known as National Taichung University of Science and Technology Minsheng Campus.

=== National Taichung University of Science and Technology ===
With the approval of The Executive Yuan, NTIT merged with the National Taichung Nursing College and assumed the name of the National Taichung University of Science and Technology (NTCUST) on December 1, 2011. With the inauguration ceremony taking place on December 19, 2011. After the merger, NTCUST will begin its next phase of growth. Starting from 2013, NTCUST will enter the second stage of its four-year university development planning. The university will actively focus on advancing its faculty research performances, facility renovation, moreover expanding its industrial-academic cooperation and international academic partnerships.

== Campus ==
The university consists of 2 campuses: the San-min Campus and the Ming-sheng Campus; the two are about a 10-minute drive apart from each other. The College of Health is located at the Min-sheng Campus while the other four colleges are located in the San-min Campus. The on-campus dormitories are divided by gender, with a total capacity of 1,382 students.

=== Library ===
Library facilities are located in the newly built Zhong Shang Building (中商大樓). The library currently houses: 279,030 Chinese publications, 49,030 Western language publications, 638,052 electronic publications, 13,562 audio/visual publications, 1,942 current periodicals & newspapers, and 17,415 bound periodicals.

== Academics ==
The university consists of 5 colleges and 1 committee: College of Business, College of Design, College of Languages and Language Applications, College of Information and Distribution Science, College of Health, and Holistic Education Committee. There are 20 undergraduate programs and 11 masters programs with an enrollment of almost 16,000 students. The university has 986 full-time and adjunct faculty, among whom 55 are full-time professors and 145 are full-time associate professors. The average student-faculty ratio is 24 to 1. NTCUST has more than 170,000 alumni from all of the academic units, with many well known business and industry professionals in Taiwan.

== Student life ==
There are 13 Student Councils organized by students of different Departments, as well as 44 student clubs from different interests including academic, art and skills, community service, and sports.

== International Collaboration ==
NTCUST has established academic relationships with many universities and academic institutions around the world. Every year, NTCUST has sent students who receive grants from the Taiwan Ministry of Education to sister universities for exchange studies or short-term study-abroad programs.

Mainland China - Hebei University, Jimei University, Xiamen University of Technology, Zhangzhou City University, XiaMen HuaXia, Vocational College, Fudan University, Xiamen University, Fuzhou University Zhicheng College, Xiamen City University, Soochow University, Beijing Vocational College of Finance and Commerce, Jiangsu Normal University, Shandong Normal University, Quanzhou Normal University, Capital University of Economics and Business

Vietnam - Tay Do University, Ton Duc Thang University, Vietnam National University Ho Chi Minh City, Vietnamese-German University, College of Foreign Economic Relations

Malaysia - Oasis College

Japan - Yasuda Women's University, Osaka University of Economics, Osaka Sangyo University, Meijo University, Sapporo University, Fukui Prefectural University

South Korea - Sahmyook University, Chonbuk National University, Chonnam National University

Canada - University of Victoria

United States - Owens Community College, Virginia Community College System, Oral Roberts University, University of Central Oklahoma, University Language Institute of Tulsa, Florida International University, Texas Tech University, University of Michigan-Flint

United Kingdom - De Montfort University

Switzerland - HTMi Hotel and Tourism Management Institute Switzerland

== Photo Gallery ==
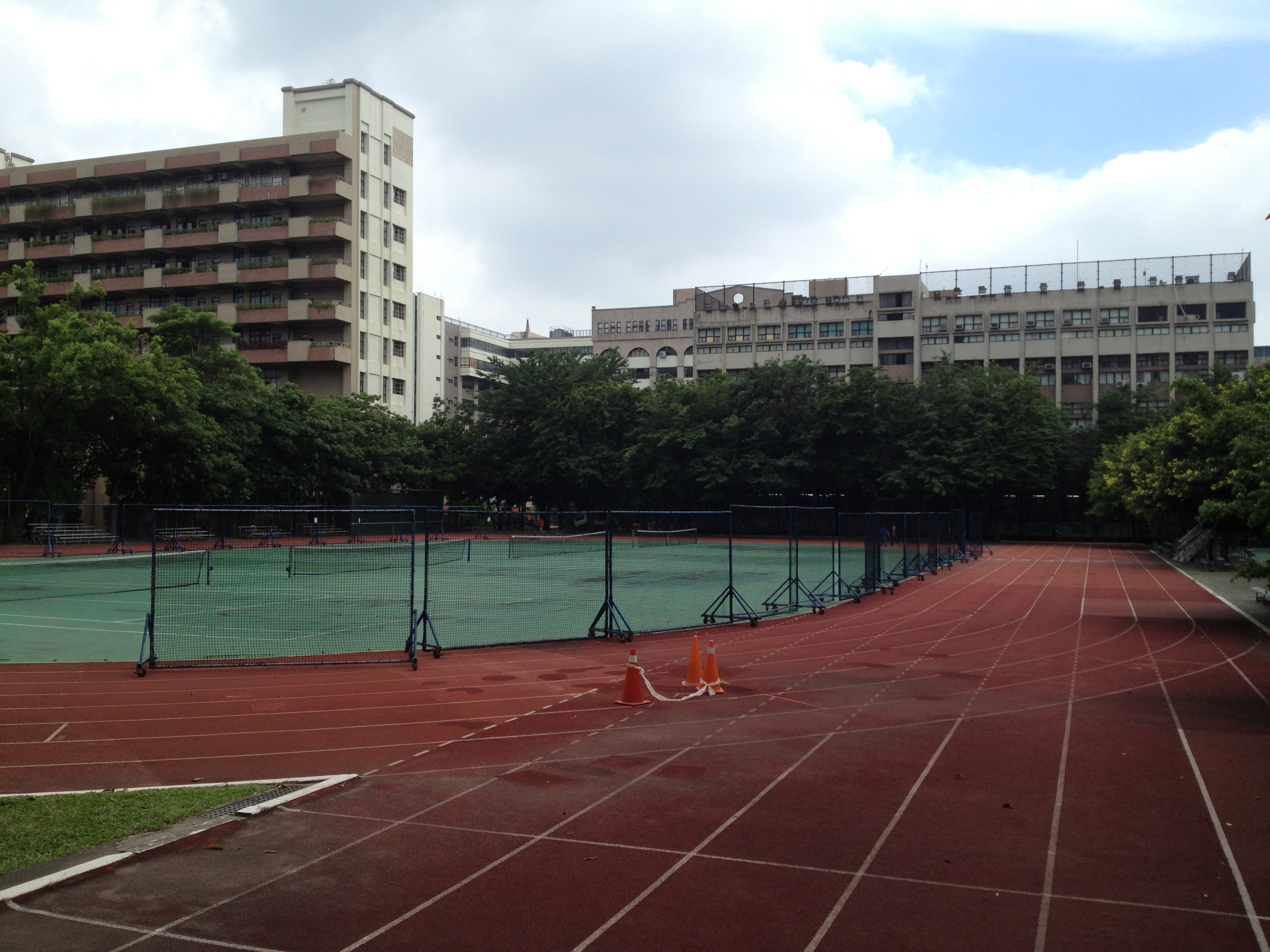
Athletic field

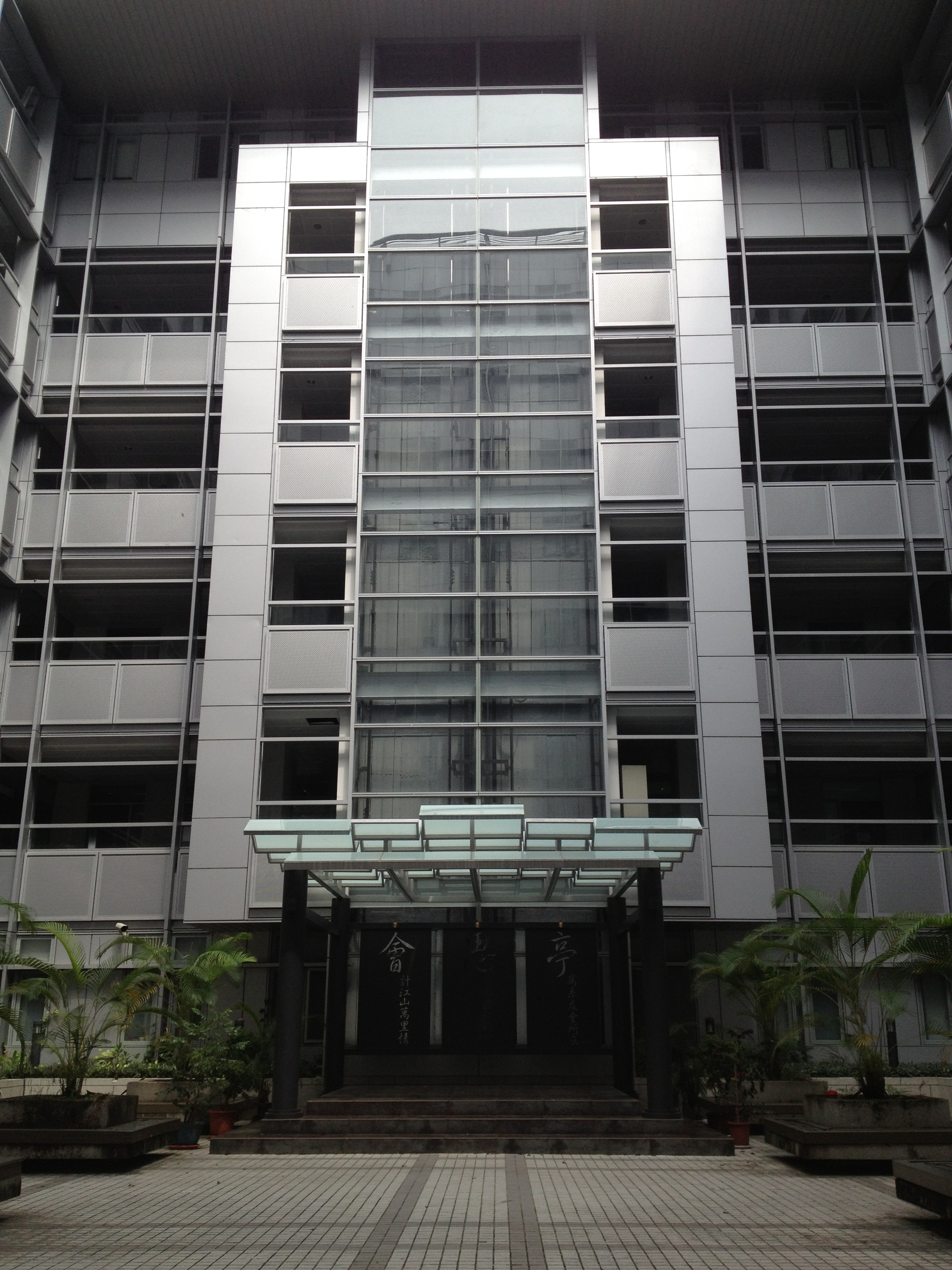
Zhong Shang Building (中商大樓) Interior Courtyard

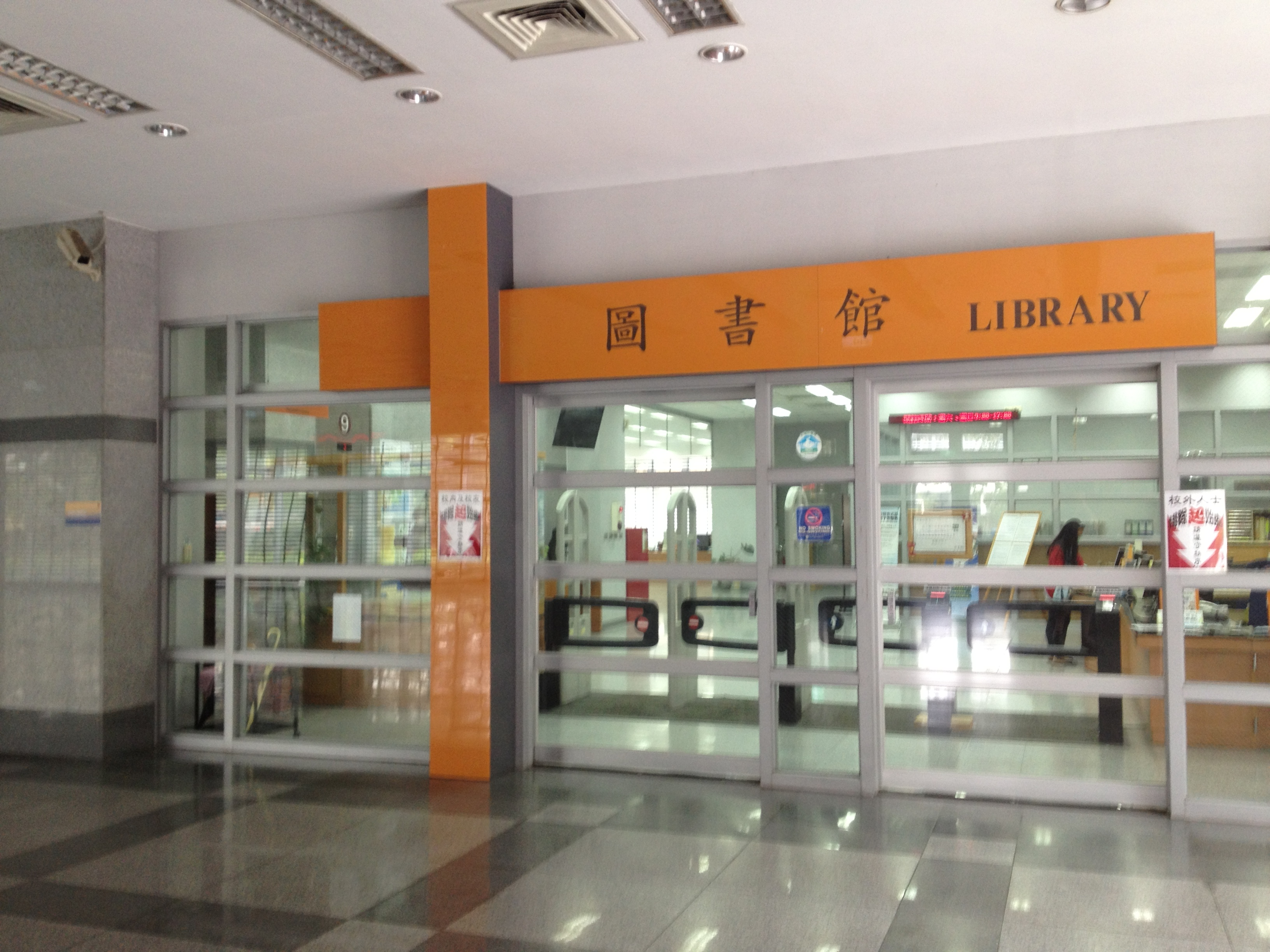
Library

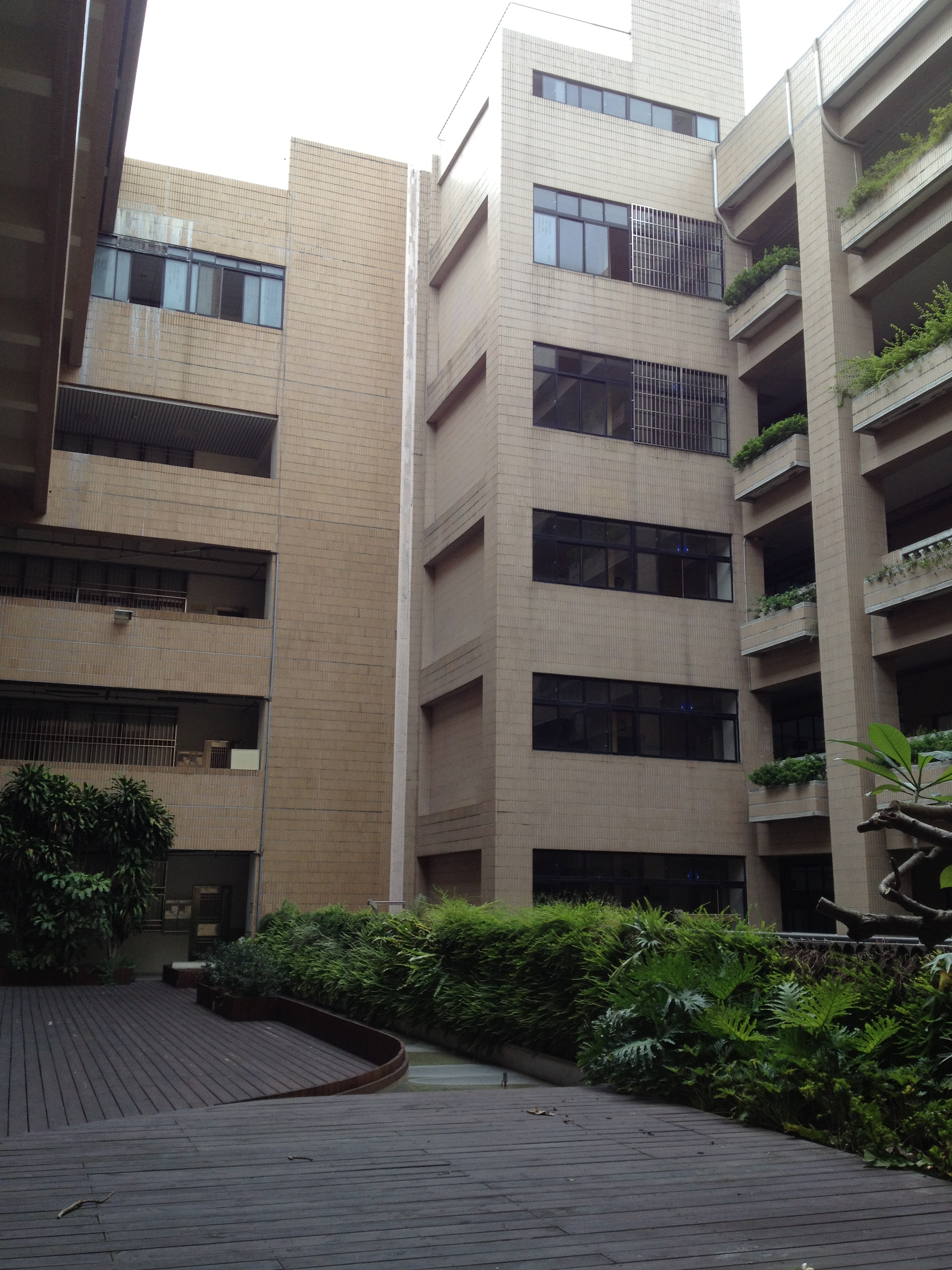
Zhong Zheng Building (中正大樓) Interior Courtyard

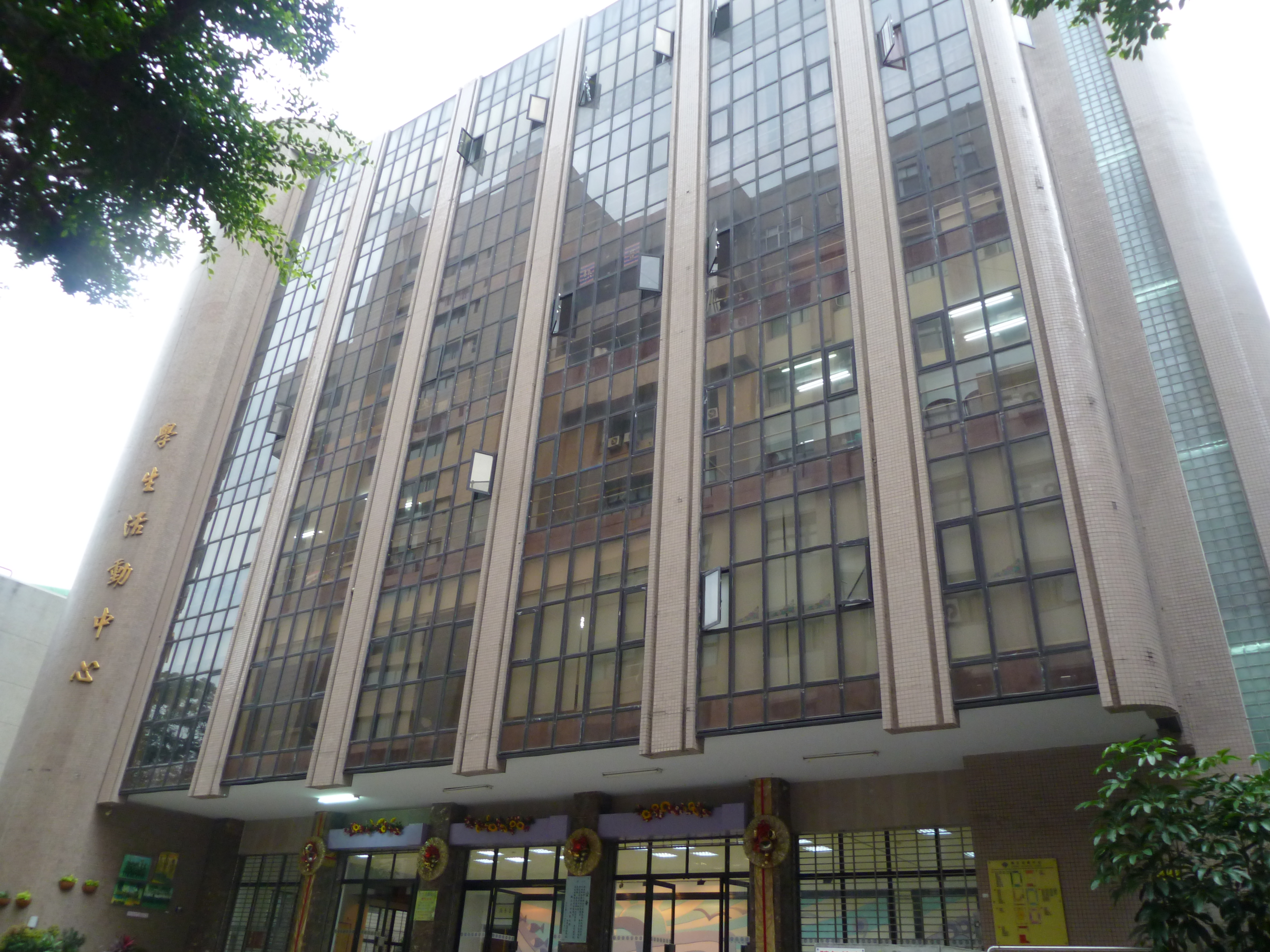
Student Activities Center(學生活動中心)

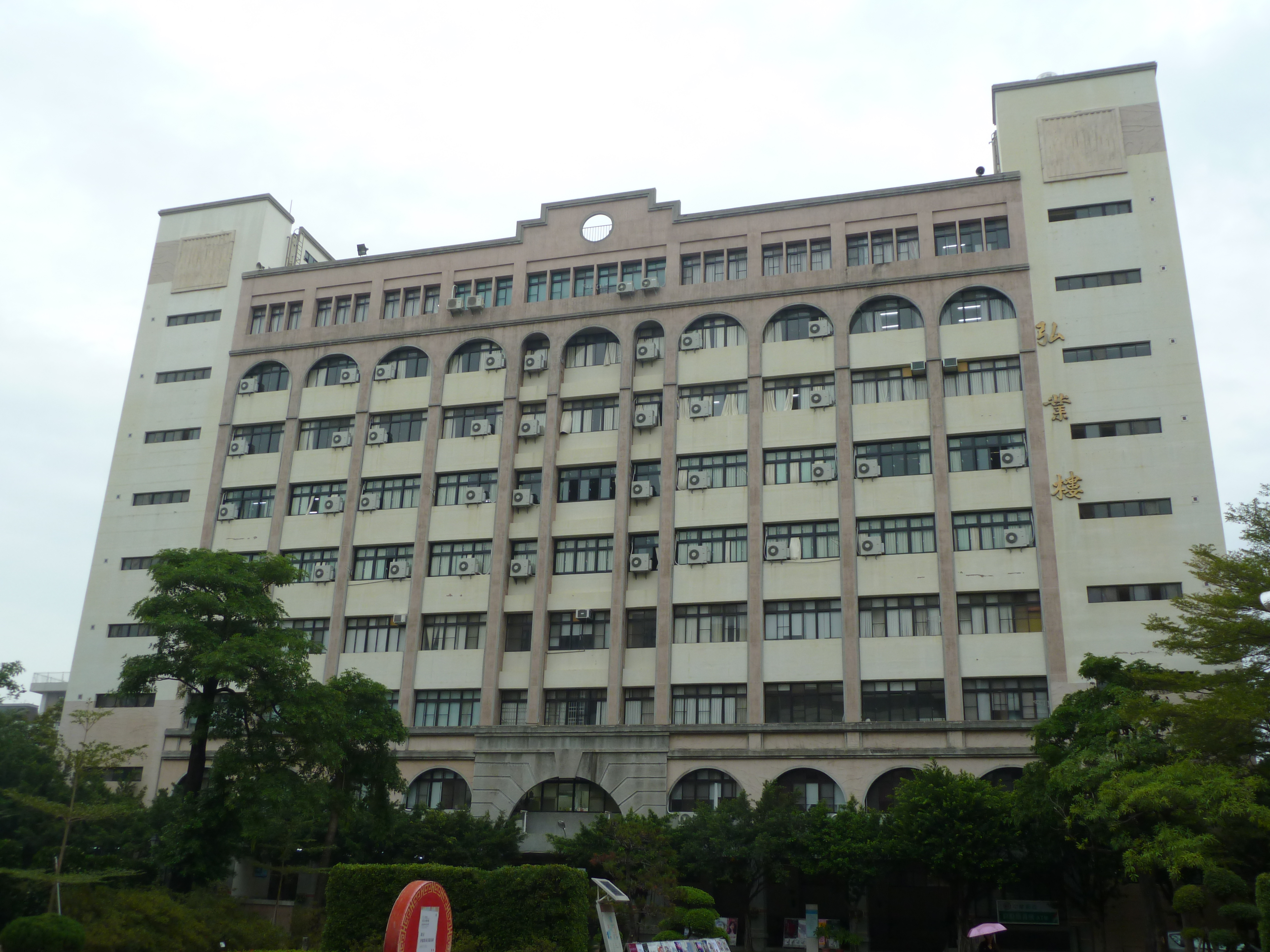
Hong Ye Building(弘業樓)

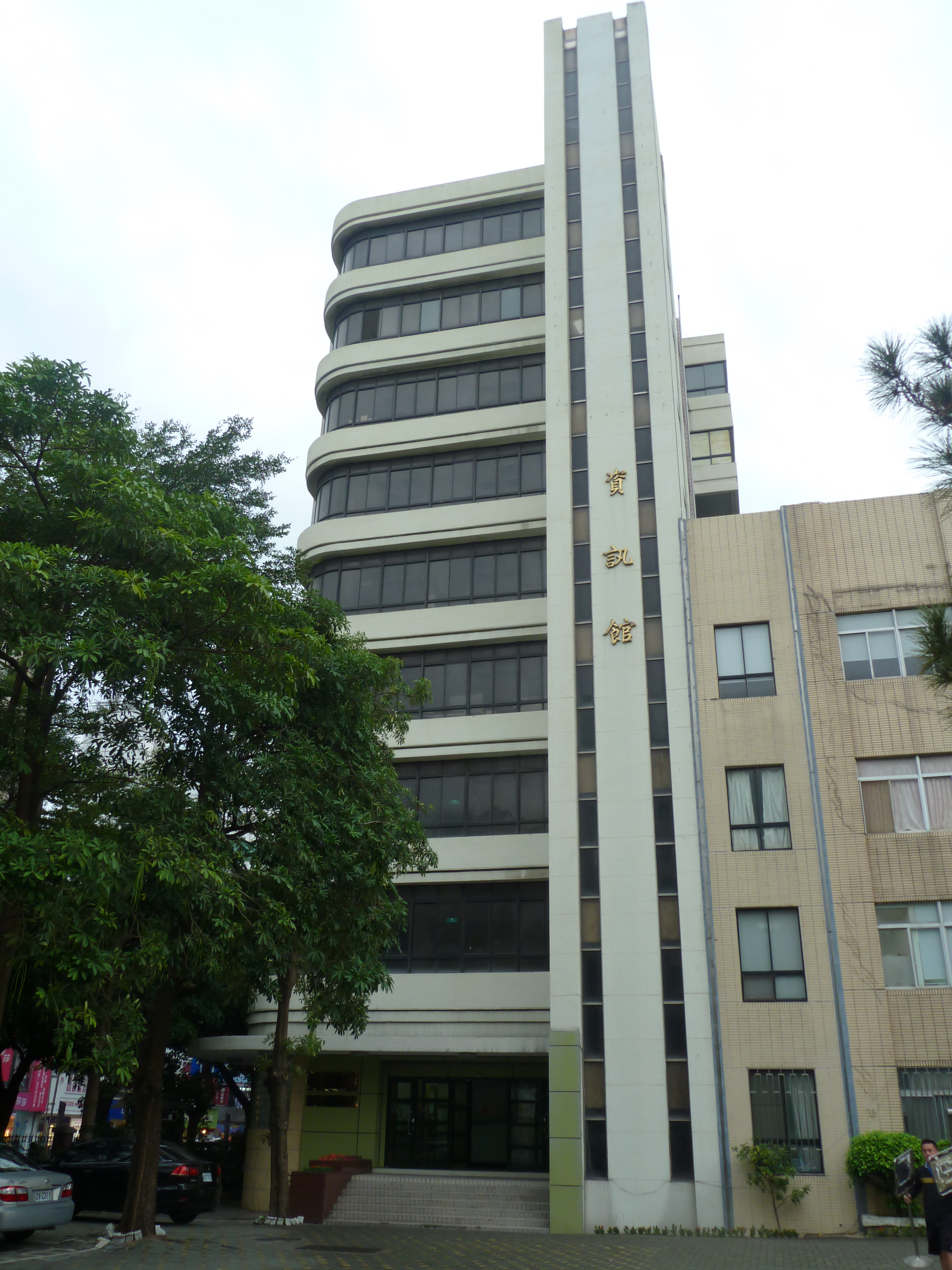
Information Building(資訊館)

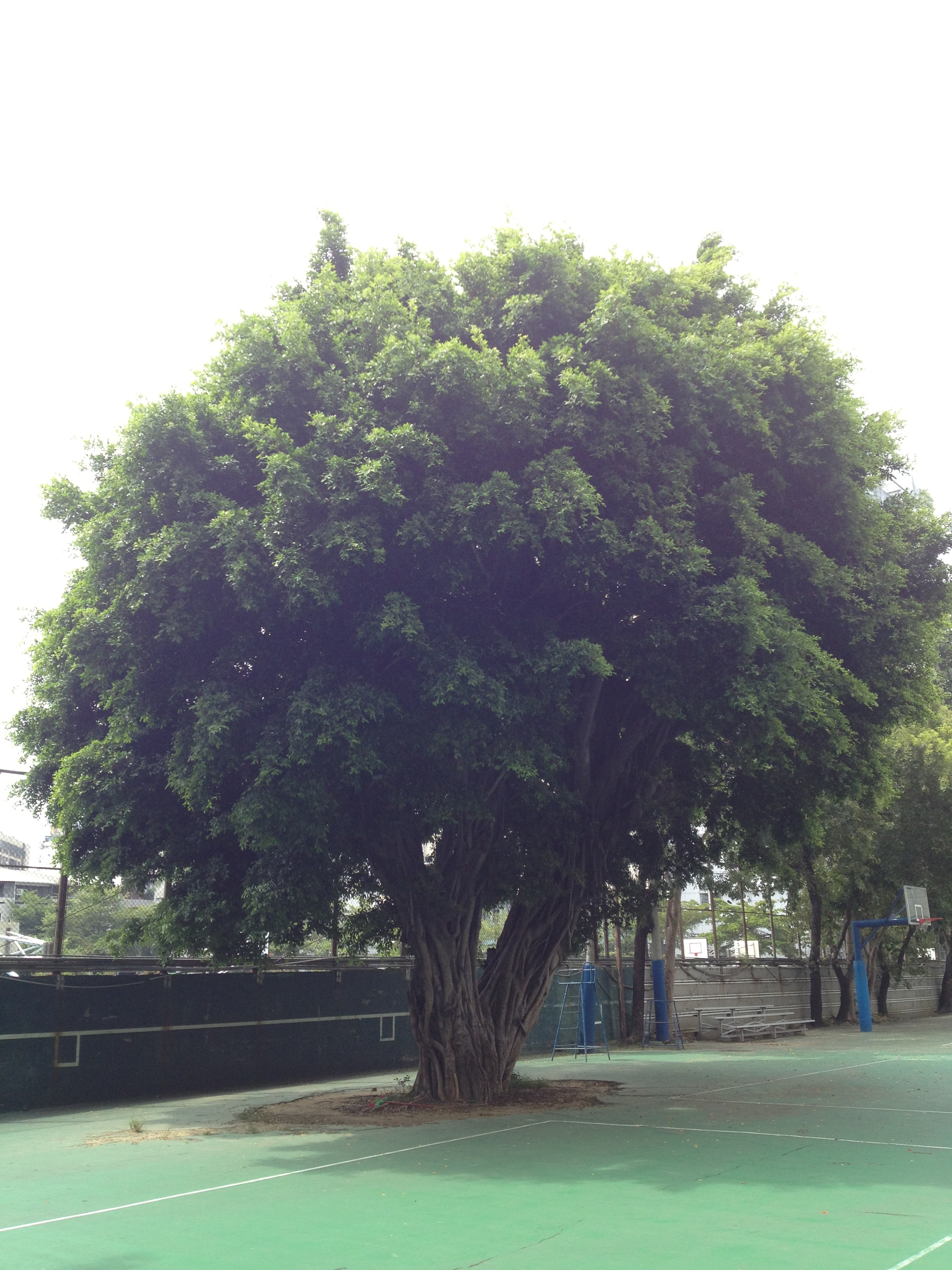
This tree has been around since the school was established in 1919, almost 100 years old

== Notable alumni ==
- Chen Mao-nan, member of Legislative Yuan (2002–2005)
- Van Fan, Taiwanese actor and singer

== See also ==
- List of universities in Taiwan
