= Taichung Park =

Park in North, Taichung, Taiwan

- 臺中公園
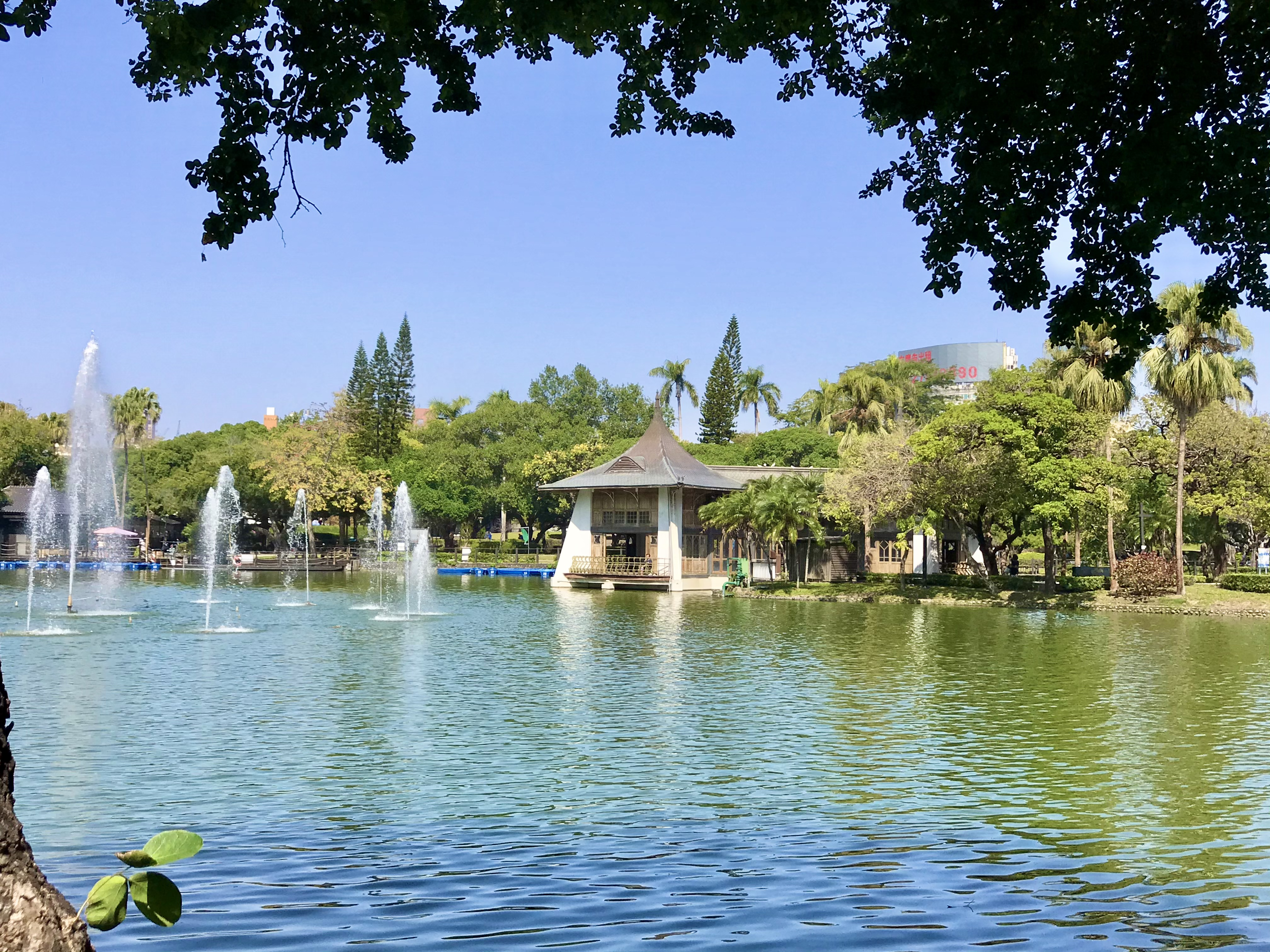
- Interactive map of Taichung Park
- Type: Urban park
- Location: North, Taichung, Taiwan
- Coordinates: 24°08′42″N 120°41′00″E
- Created: 1903

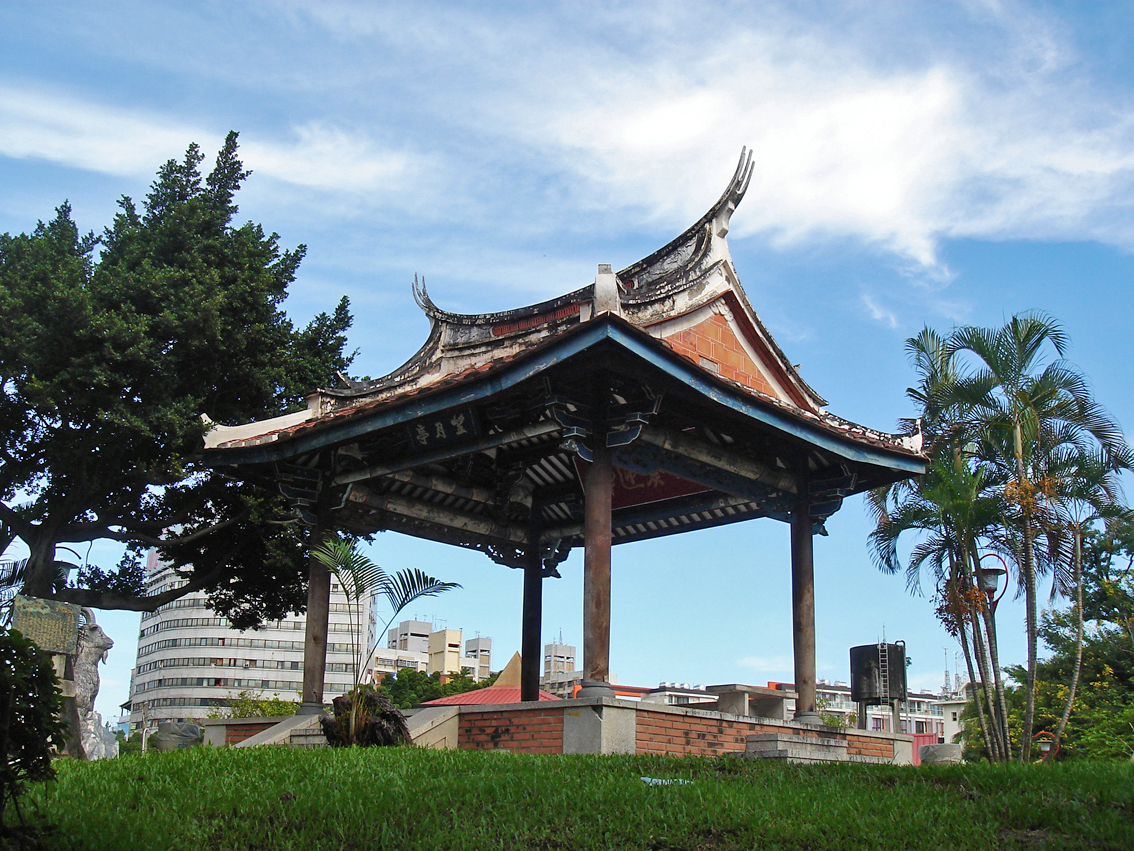
Taiwan Castle North gate

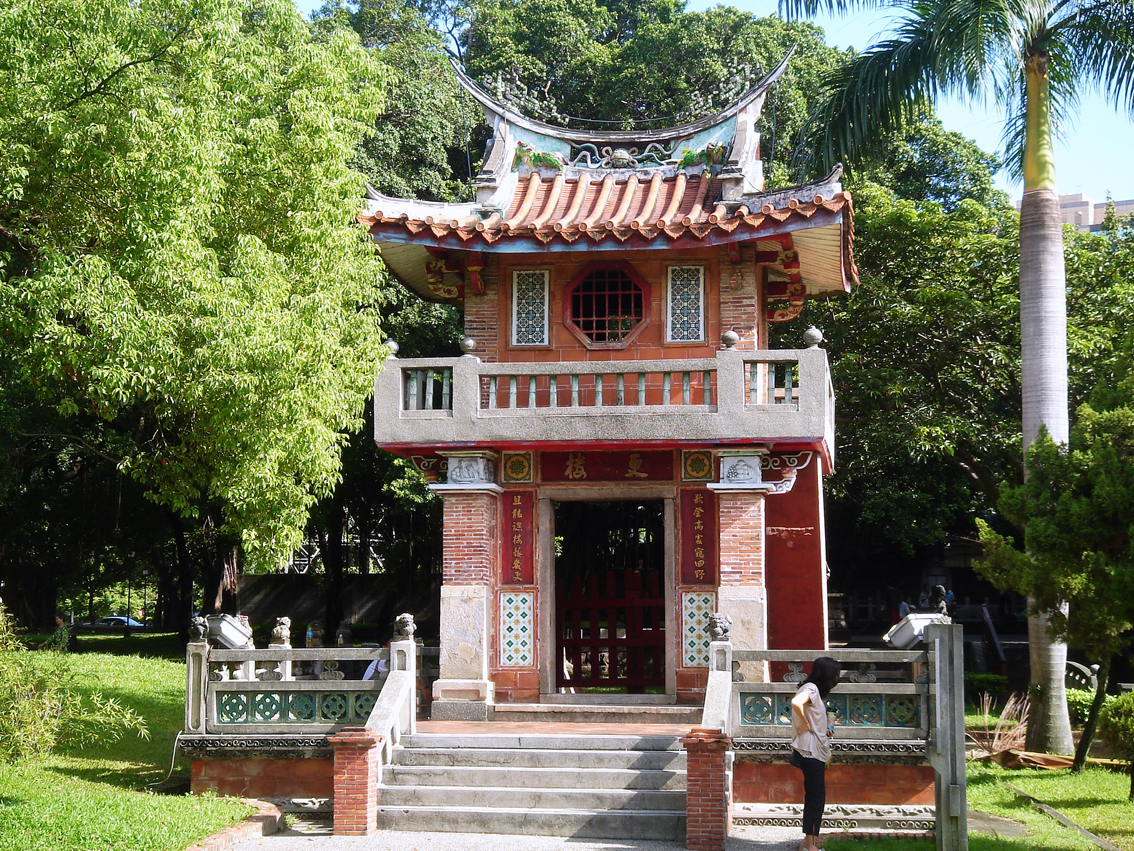
Taichung Wu's Residence gatehouse

The Taichung Park (Chinese: 臺中公園; pinyin: Táizhōng gōngyuán) is an urban park in North District, Taichung, Taiwan. It is the oldest park in Taichung. It was built when Taiwan was under Japanese rule and is also called “Chungshan Park” (中山公園; 'Sun Yat-sen park').

== History ==
The park, originally called Nakanoshima kōen (Japanese: 中之島公園), was built in 1903 during the Japanese era. On 17 April 1999, the Taichung City Government listed it as a city historical site. In recent years, people have celebrated the Lantern Festival in Taichung Park.

== Features ==
The park has an artificial lake which covers an area of 13,530 m^{2}. It also has two adjacent pavilions in the lake which were built to commemorate the establishment of Crossway Railway in 1908.

== Facilities ==
The park has facilities for kayaking in the lake, tennis court, outdoor platform and kids playground.

== See also ==
- List of parks in Taiwan
