= North District, Taichung =

District in Taichung, Taiwan

Coordinates: 24°9′27.4″N 120°40′51″E

North 北區
- District
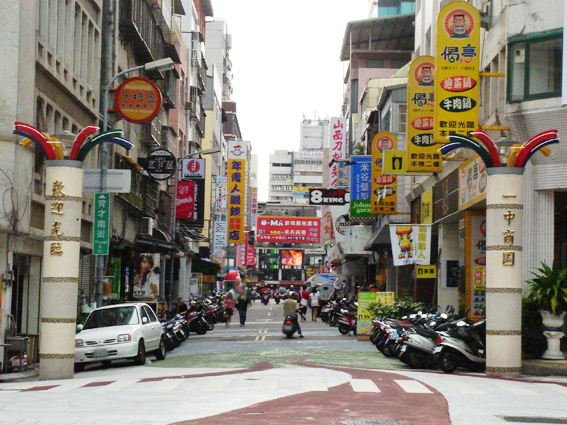

- North District in Taichung City
- Location: Taichung, Taiwan

Area
  - Total: 6.94 km^{2} (2.68 sq mi)

Population (February 2023)
  - Total: 143,103
  - Density: 20,600/km^{2} (53,400/sq mi)
- Website: www.north.taichung.gov.tw (in Chinese)

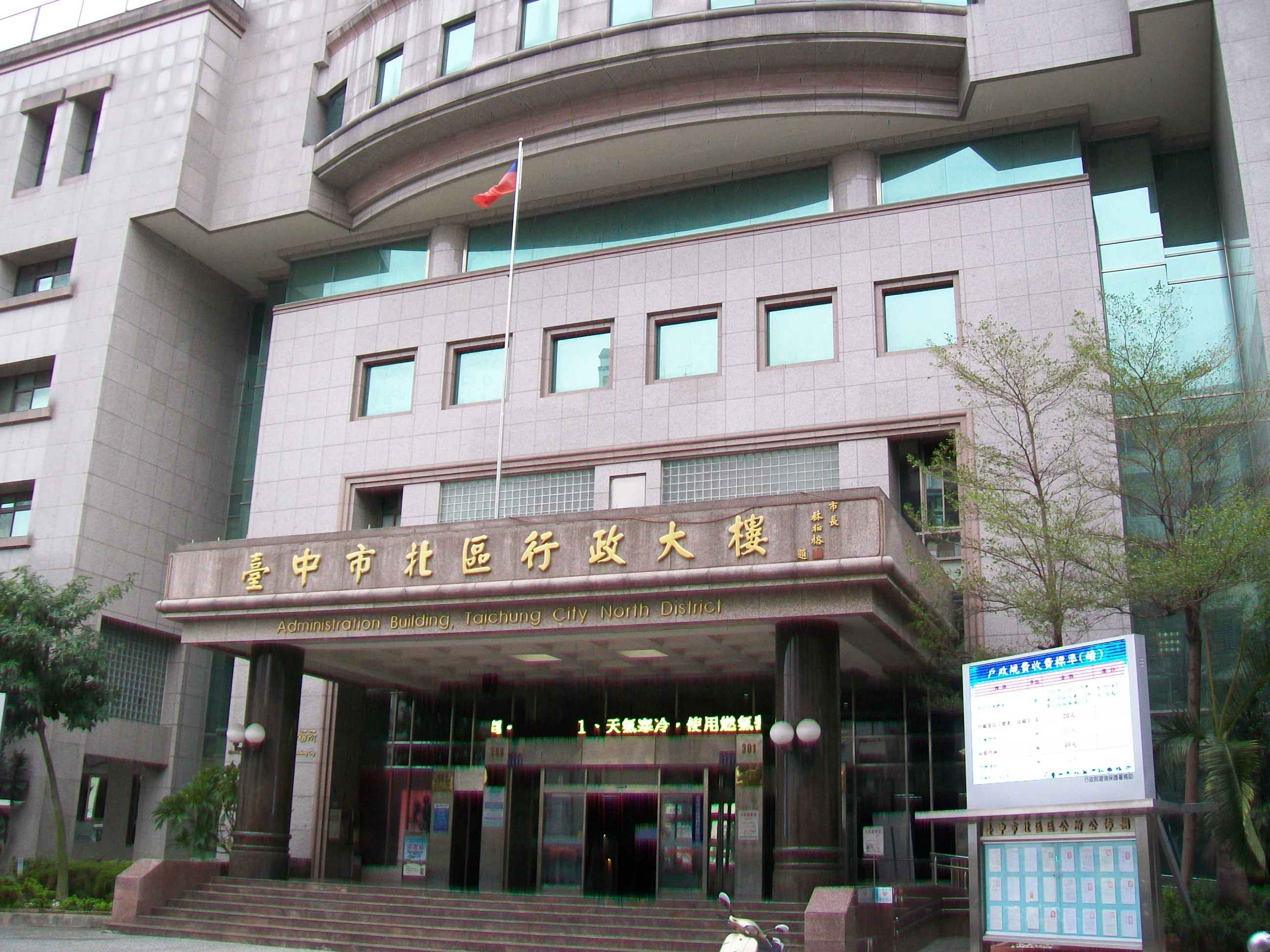
North District office

North District (Chinese: 北區; pinyin: Běi Qū) is an urban district in the Taiwanese city of Taichung. It was a part of Taichung before the City and County were amalgamated in 2010. The North District is one of Taichung's major developed shopping, education, and cultural areas.

== History ==
The district was a part of Taichung provincial city before the merger with Taichung County to form Taichung special municipality on 25 December 2010.

== Administrative divisions ==
Zhongzheng, Liuge, Guangda, Wenzhuang, Dahu, Wuchang, Jinping, Xinbei, Xinxing, Leying, Jincun, Jiancheng, Jiande, Jinzhou, Jinxiang, Jinhua, Jinlong, Qiucuo, Jianxing, Dingcuo, Chongde, Laicuo, Laifu, Laixing, Laiwang, Laiming, Meichuan, Laicun, Yude, Dangou, Jianhang, Mingde, Mingxin, Zhangjing, Liren and Zhongda Village.

== Education ==
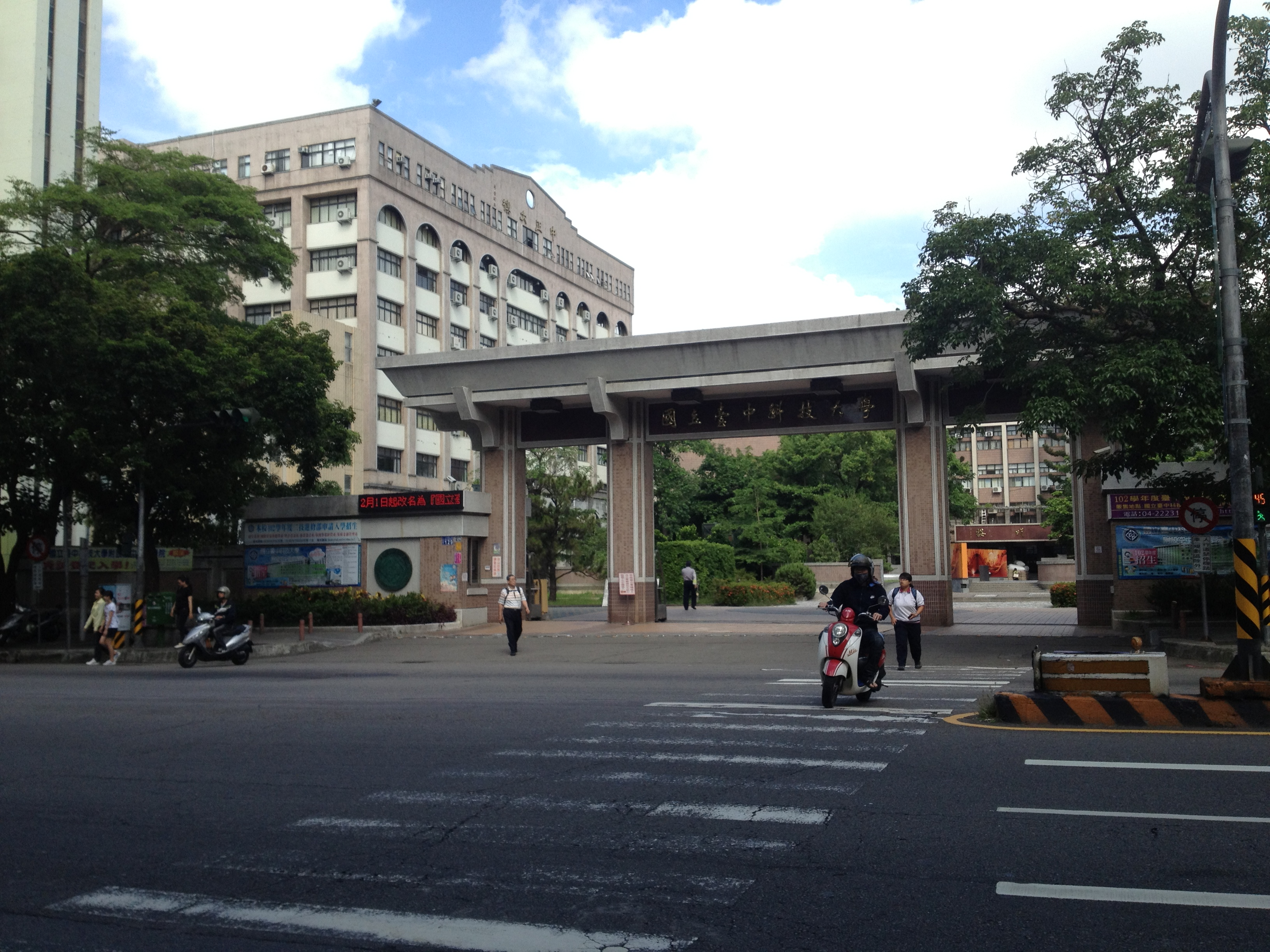
National Taichung University of Science and Technology

=== Universities ===
- National Taiwan University of Sport
- National Taichung University of Science and Technology
- China Medical University

=== High schools ===
- Taichung Municipal Taichung First Senior High School
- National Taichung Second Senior High School
- Stella Matutina Girls' High School
- Shin Min High School
- Kuang-Hwa Vocational High School of Technology

== Institutions ==
- Headquarter of Taiwan Water Corporation

== Tourist attractions ==
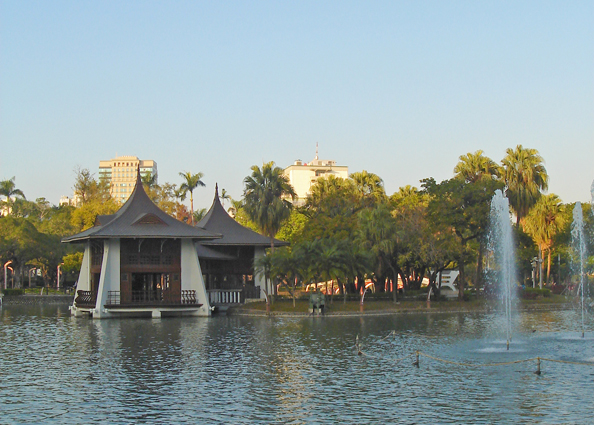
Taichung Park

- National Museum of Natural Science and Taichung Botanical Garden
- Taichung Broadcasting Bureau
- Taichung Confucian Temple
- Taichung Martyrs' Shrine
- Taichung Mayor's House
- Taichung Park
- Wen Ying Hall
- Yuanbao Temple

== Shopping ==
- Yizhong Street

== See also ==
- Taichung
