= Taichung Botanical Garden =

Botanical garden in North, Taichung, Taiwan

- 國立自然科學博物館植物園
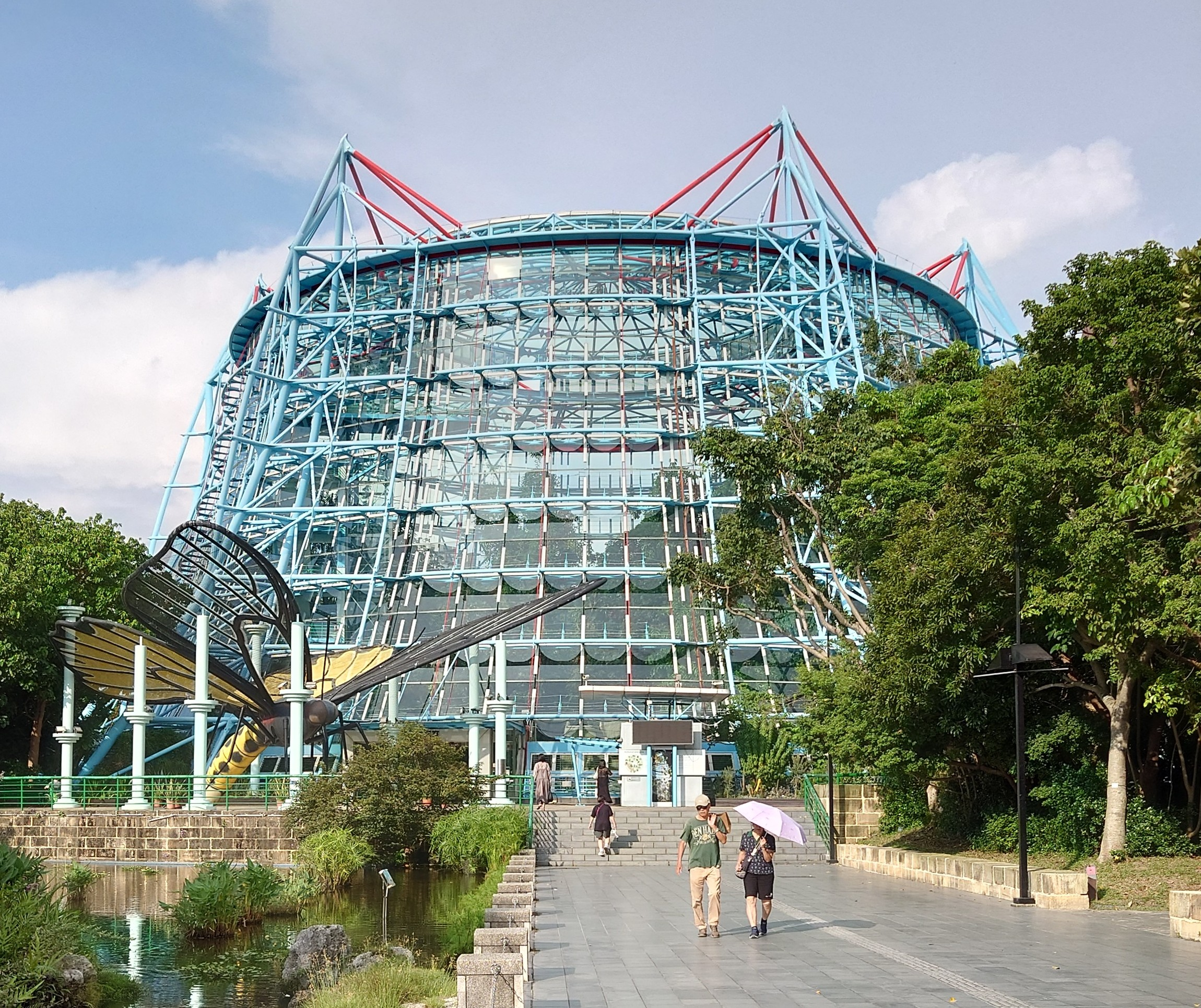
- Interactive map of Taichung Botanical Garden
- Type: botanical garden
- Location: North, Taichung, Taiwan
- Coordinates: 24°09′29.1″N 120°40′05.4″E
- Area: 4.5 hectares (11 acres)
- Opening: 23 July 1999
- Website: Official website

The Taichung Botanical Garden (traditional Chinese: 國立自然科學博物館植物園; simplified Chinese: 国立自然科学博物馆植物园; pinyin: Guólì Zìrán Kēxué Bówùguǎn Zhíwùyuán) is a botanical garden in North District, Taichung, Taiwan. It is part of the National Museum of Natural Science.

== History ==
The botanical garden was opened on 23 July 1999 in a ceremony attended by Education Minister Yang Chao-hsiang, Taichung Mayor Chang Wen-ying and National Museum of Natural Science Director Chow Yien-shing.

== Geography ==
The botanical garden spans over an area of 4.5 hectares. It is divided into two parts which are the Tropical Rain Forest Greenhouse and the Botanical Garden.

== Architecture ==
The Tropical Rain Forest Greenhouse has a height of 31 meters and diameter of 56 meters. It was constructed with steel and glass.

== See also ==
- List of tourist attractions in Taiwan
