= Syuejia Tzu Chi Temple =

Temple in Syuejia, Tainan, Taiwan

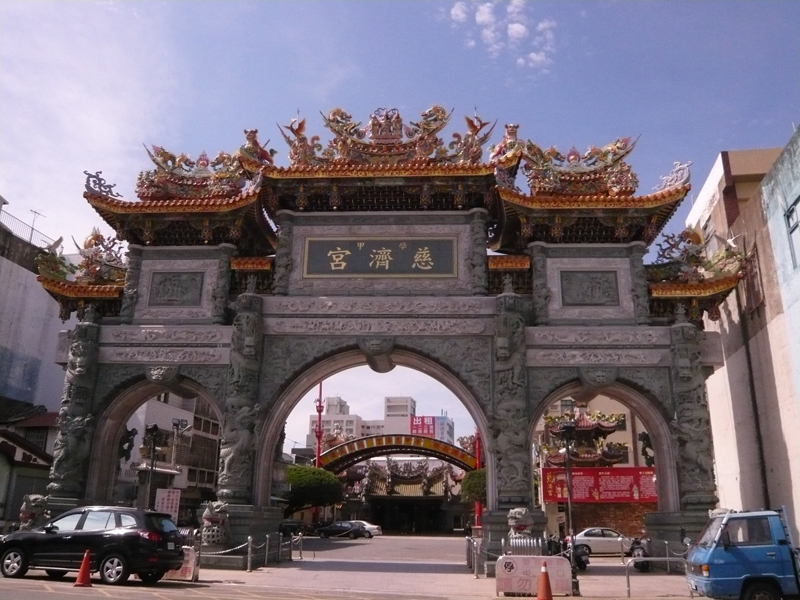

Location
- Location: Syuejia District, Tainan City, Taiwan
- Interactive map of Syuejia Tzu Chi Temple

Architecture
- Completed: 40th year of the Kangxi reign (1701)
- Materials: Brick, wood, stone
- Type: Municipality-designated Historic Monument, Temple
- Designated: August 19, 1985

Syuejia Tzu Chi Temple is a temple located in Syuejia District, Tainan City, Taiwan.

It is dedicated to Baosheng Emperor as the main deity and serves as a "community temple" within the "Syuejia Thirteen Villages" region.

It is also the ancestral temple for most of the temples in the Annan District's festival organization and is designated as a historic site by the Tainan City government.

== Environment ==
Syuejia Tzu Chi Temple is located on Jisheng Road in Cifu Village, at the center of Syuejia District, near the Syuejia Market.

The current temple grounds were donated during the Qing Dynasty by a devotee from Yanshui Port (present-day Yanshui District) and cover an area of approximately 0.213 hectares.

== History ==
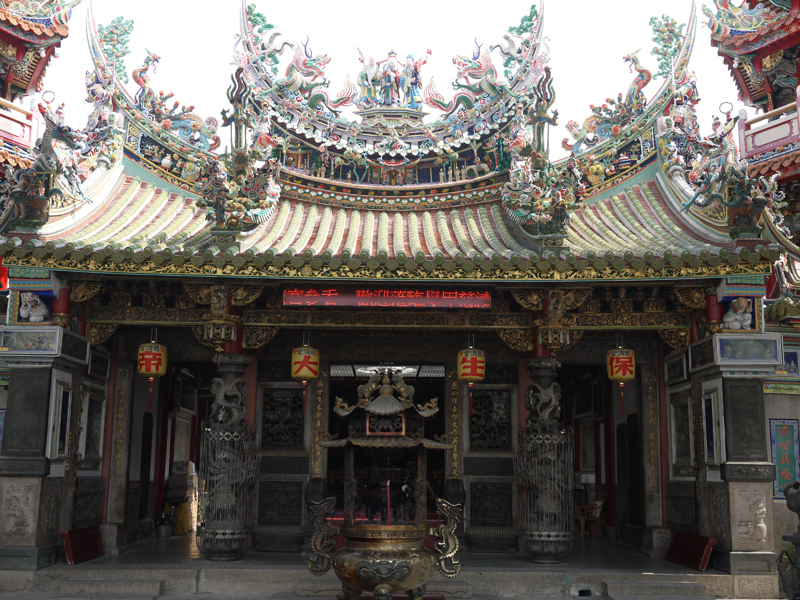
The Sanchuan Hall of Syuejia Tzu Chi Temple

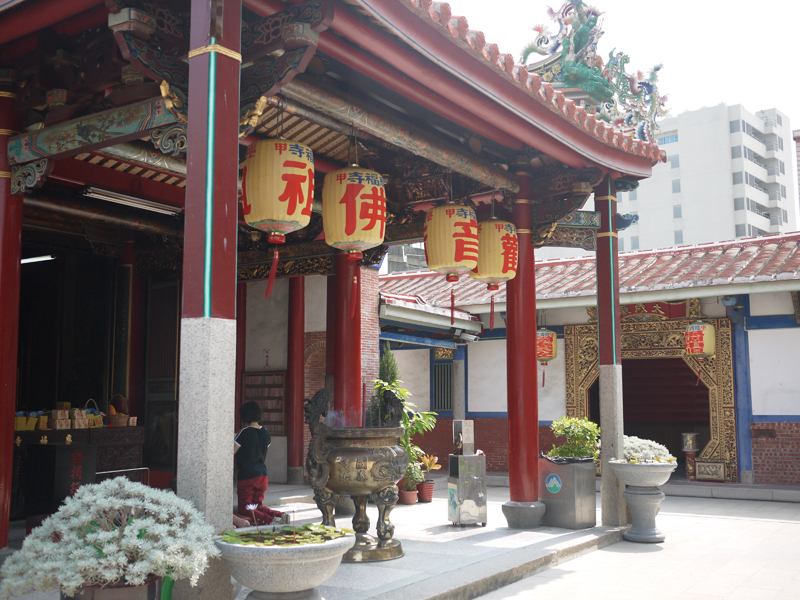
The Rear Hall (Cifu Temple) of Syuejia Tzu Chi Temple

Syuejia Tzu Chi Temple is dedicated to Baosheng Emperor.

It is said that the temple's principal deity statues, known as the “Two Founding Deities,” are said to have originated from the ancestral temple Baijiao Tzu Chi Temple in Baijiao Village, Jiaomei Town, Longhai District, Zhangzhou City (formerly Baijiao Township, Tong’an County, Quanzhou Prefecture, Fujian Province).

They are believed to be among the three original statues of Baosheng Emperor carved when the ancestral temple was first established.

Since the temple was built in the 21st year of the Shaoxing era of the Southern Song Dynasty (1151), the statues are likely to be over 800 years old.

This deity statue was brought during the Ming Zheng period by Li Sheng, a resident of Jishan Village, Baijiao Township.

He crossed the sea to Taiwan along with Chen Yigui, a general under Koxinga (Zheng Chenggong).

In the 40th year of the Kangxi reign (1701), devotees donated land, and a temple was officially built at the current site to enshrine the deity, becoming the local center of worship.

Over time, the sphere of worship gradually expanded to cover the entire Syuejia administrative district.

=== Sphere of worship ===
The ritual sphere of Syuejia Tzu Chi Temple is centered in today's downtown Syuejia.

=== Faith community ===
The faith community of Syuejia Tzu Chi Temple has gradually expanded in scope since the Qing dynasty.

== Building ==
=== Construction history ===
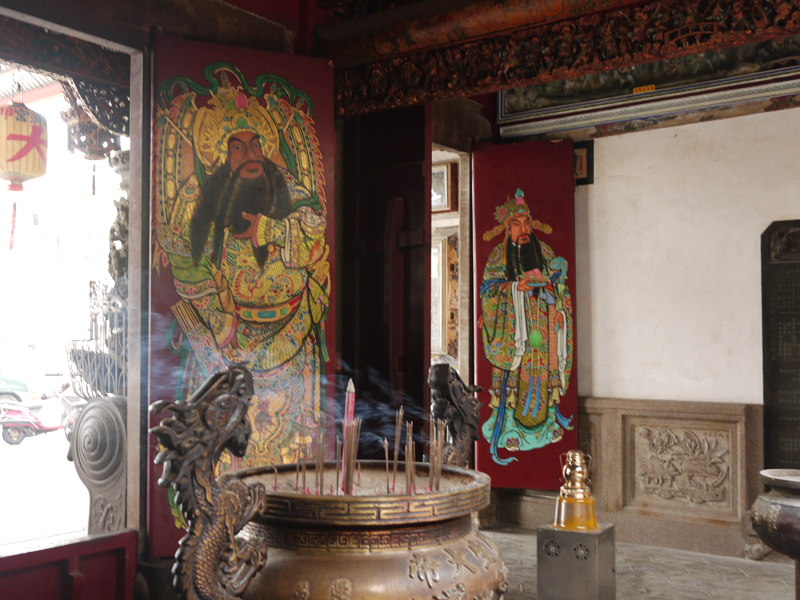
Door Gods of the Sanchuan Hall

Syuejia Tzu Chi Temple was originally a simple thatched hut and was officially constructed as a temple in the year 1701.

The temple's architectural structure underwent seven significant renovations throughout its history, in the years 1744 (9th year of Qianlong reign), 1806 (11th year of Jiaqing reign), 1860 (10th year of Xianfeng reign), 1929 (4th year of Showa era), 1965 (54th year of the Republic of China), 1977 (66th year of the Republic of China), and from 2000 to 2003 (89th to 92nd years of the Republic of China).

In 2005, a restoration of monument paintings was carried out.

=== Annex ===
On either side of the courtyard of Syuejia Tzu Chi Temple are the Sun-Moon Wells (also known as the Dragon-Tiger Wells).

In 1955, the temple built shops on the western side of its premises.

In 1966, the Cisheng Annex was built on Jisheng Road.

In 1977, the Baosheng Guesthouse was constructed on the left side of the temple to serve as a pilgrims’ lodge.

In 1982, the Tzu Chi Cultural Building was constructed in front of the Baosheng Guesthouse, also serving as a stage for performances.

==== Baijiao Pavilion ====
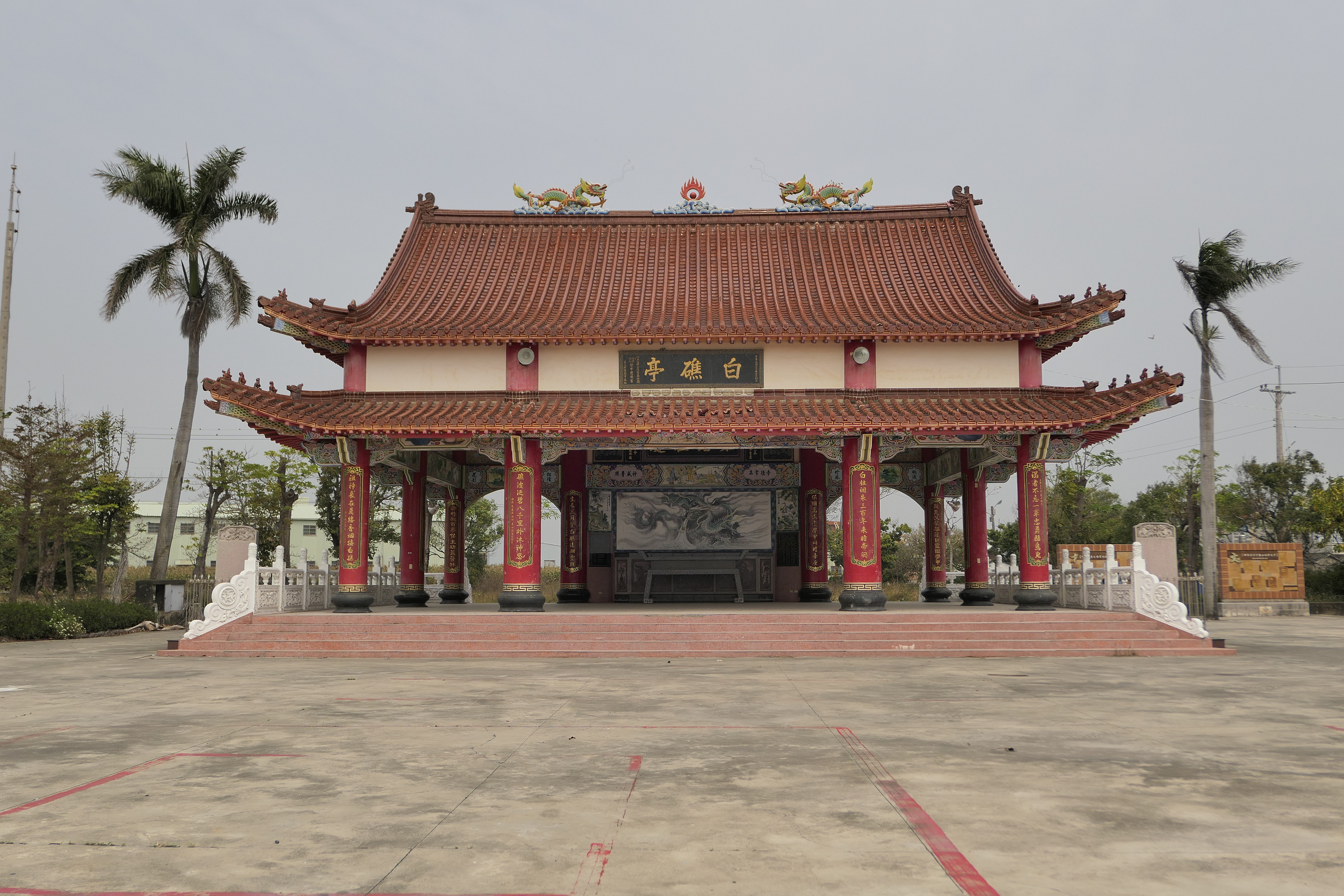
The Baijiao Pavilion

In 1978, Syuejia Tzu Chi Temple erected a memorial stele by the Jiangjun River at Touqianliao in that area.

In 1981, the Baijiao Pavilion was erected there to serve as a venue for ancestral worship ceremonies.

==== Sun-Moon Wells ====
The Sun-Moon Wells (also known as the Dragon-Tiger Wells) are two wells situated on either side of the temple courtyard.

On the east side (the Azure Dragon side) is the circular Sun Well.

On the west side (the White Tiger side) is the crescent-shaped Moon Well.

In folk belief, this arrangement symbolizes “resonating with Heaven and responding to Earth,” and is thought to help worshippers convey their intentions to the deities.

== Important Cultural Artifacts ==
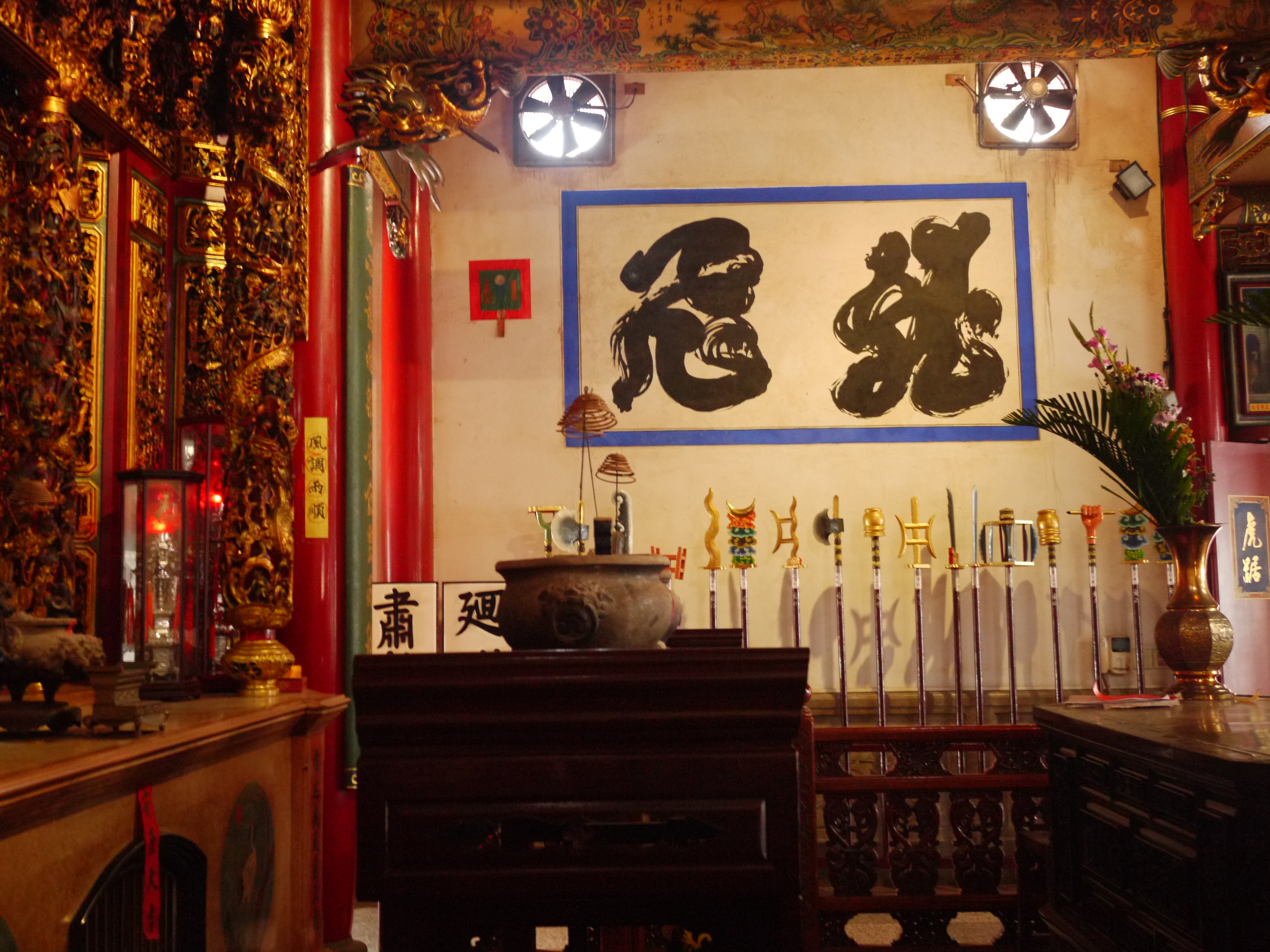
"Longfei" (Flying Dragon) in wild-cursive script

In 1860 during the renovation, the renowned artisan Ye Wang (Ye Linzhi) was hired to cochin ware, adorned the walls and temple roof becoming a treasured possession of the temple.

During the 1929 renovation, due to the weathering and deterioration of many pieces by Ye Wang, a skilled craftsman, He Jinlong, was hired to craft some papercutting to replace a part of cochin ware.

In 1980, 56 pieces of artwork by Ye Wang were stolen overnight.

By 2003, 36 of these pieces were unexpectedly acquired by Chen Yongtai, the chairman of the cultural and educational foundation of Aurora Group.

He donated to Tzu Chi Temple in 2004, subsequently, the temple established the Ye Wang Cochin Ware Cultural Museum for the collection.

Currently, the temple is collecting over a hundred pieces of Ye Wang's artwork.

Most of them have been removed from the temple's architecture and are preserved in the cultural museum.

The 208 cut-and-paste ceramic art pieces by He Jinlong are finely crafted and represent one of the architectural highlights of Tzu Chi Temple.

In the main hall hangs a piece of wild cursive calligraphy created by calligrapher Yang Caoxian in his nineties.

Featuring the four characters “Long Fei” (“Soaring Dragon”) and “Feng Wu” (“Dancing Phoenix”), each character measures four feet in height.The door gods of the Shanchuan Hall were originally painted by Tainan artisan Pan Lishui and were repainted during the temple's reconstruction in 2004.

Meanwhile, the door paintings on the Dragon and Tiger Gates on either side were created by the late Li Hanqing, recipient of the New Heritage Award.

== Festival ==
=== Shang Bai Jiao ancestral festival ===
The Shang Bai Jiao Ancestral Festival is the most important annual event of Syuejia Tzu Chi Temple.

It is one of the five major Southwest Taiwan incense festivals and takes place on the 11th day of the 3rd lunar month each year.

Believers from Syuejia's thirteen villages conduct a ritual within the district to remotely pay homage to the Bai Jiao Tzu Chi ancestral temple in mainland China.

This festival can be traced back to the early Qing Dynasty, during the reigns of Emperor Yongzheng and Emperor Qianlong, which was believed to have taken on its fundamental form during the reigns of Daoguang.

The Ancestral Festival was originally a local temple fair within the township, but its scale was gradually expanded after 1977.

In 2008, the former Tainan County Government designated the “Syuejia Shang Baijiao Incense-offering Procession” as a county-level cultural asset.

In 2022 (the Renyin year), the Ministry of Culture officially registered it as a “National Important Folk Event.”

== Related anecdotes and folklore ==
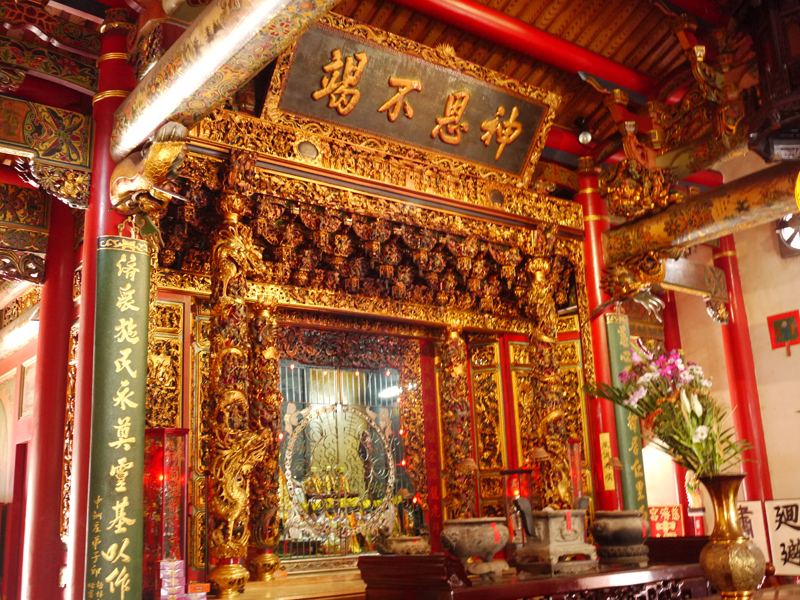
Plaque "Endless Divine Blessings"

=== The “Two Founding Deities” were lost and recovered ===
According to local legend in Syuejia, the statues of the “Two Founding Deities” at Syuejia Tzu Chi Temple went missing around 1860, leaving only the wooden deity throne behind.

In 1945, the statues were discovered in Beishewei and brought back to the temple.

Upon hearing the news, the residents of Zhaizigang in Syuejia dispatched eight men to carry the palanquin and escort the deity statues back to Syuejia.

The Xiashijiao sector relinquished its right to receive and enshrine the Two Founding Deities and returned the statues to Syuejia Tzu Chi Temple for worship.

Embedded in the left wall of the temple's main hall is a stone inscription titled the “Agreement on the Return of the Two Founding Deities to Tzu Chi Temple,” which records this historical event.

=== Tzu Chi Temple and Qingji Temple Severed Their Incense Ties ===
Since the Qing dynasty, Syuejia Tzu Chi Temple had regularly traveled to Baijiao Tzu Chi Temple in Fujian to pay ancestral homage.

Following tradition, Syuejia Dawan Qingji Temple was invited to participate, with the Baosheng Emperor worshiped at Qingji Temple holding equal ritual status to the Baosheng Emperor of Syuejia Tzu Chi Temple.

In 1983, Tzu Chi Temple built the Baijiao Pavilion at the ritual site by the Jiangjun River.

Citing the limited space inside the pavilion, the temple altered the ritual status of the Baosheng Emperor of Qingji Temple, which caused dissatisfaction within Qingji Temple's administration.

In 1988, Qingji Temple officially withdrew from the Shangbaijiao ancestral rites and began conducting its own ancestral homage and water-fetching ceremonies.

As a result, the two temples—Tzu Chi Temple and Qingji Temple—severed their incense relationship.

Each commissioned scholars to consult historical documents and trace their respective origins in order to assert which temple had the earlier founding date.

This became a well-known case of competing claims to orthodoxy within Taiwan's folk religion.

=== The Origins of the Old Four Great Emperor Statues ===
During the Shangbaijiao Festival, the palanquins from Cizhao Temple in Syuejia Village, Syuejia District are arranged in front of Tzu Chi Temple.

This tradition originates from the time when Cizhao Temple commissioned the carving of a new Baosheng Dadi statue for worship.

The newly carved statue was taller than the Baosheng Dadi statue in Tzu Chi Temple, and shortly after it was installed, a series of misfortunes occurred in Syuejia Village.

After the village elders consulted the deity for guidance, it was decided that the original Four Great Emperors worshipped in Tzu Chi Temple would be exchanged with the statue from Cizhao Temple.

As a result, the “Old Four Great Emperors” currently enshrined in Tzu Chi Temple are actually the original founding deity statues of Cizhao Temple.

== Temples Receiving Offshoot Deities ==
As the people of Syuejia migrated and established new settlements, the branch temples derived from Syuejia Tzu Chi Temple spread across Taiwan.

== Management Committee ==
Before 1948, in accordance with common temple practices during the Japanese colonial period, a manager was appointed to oversee temple affairs and participate in ritual activities.

After 1949, the “Tzu Chi Temple Management Committee” was established. Beginning in 1962, the temple was registered as the “Syuejia Tzu Chi Temple Foundation of Tainan County, Taiwan Province.”

== Nearby Attractions ==
Located in downtown Syuejia, the temple is close to several tourist destinations, including Wanpi World Wildlife Zoo and the Koi Homeland Leisure Farm.

== See also ==
- Hsieh Clan Lion Troupe
