= Cochin ware =

Style of Chinese pottery

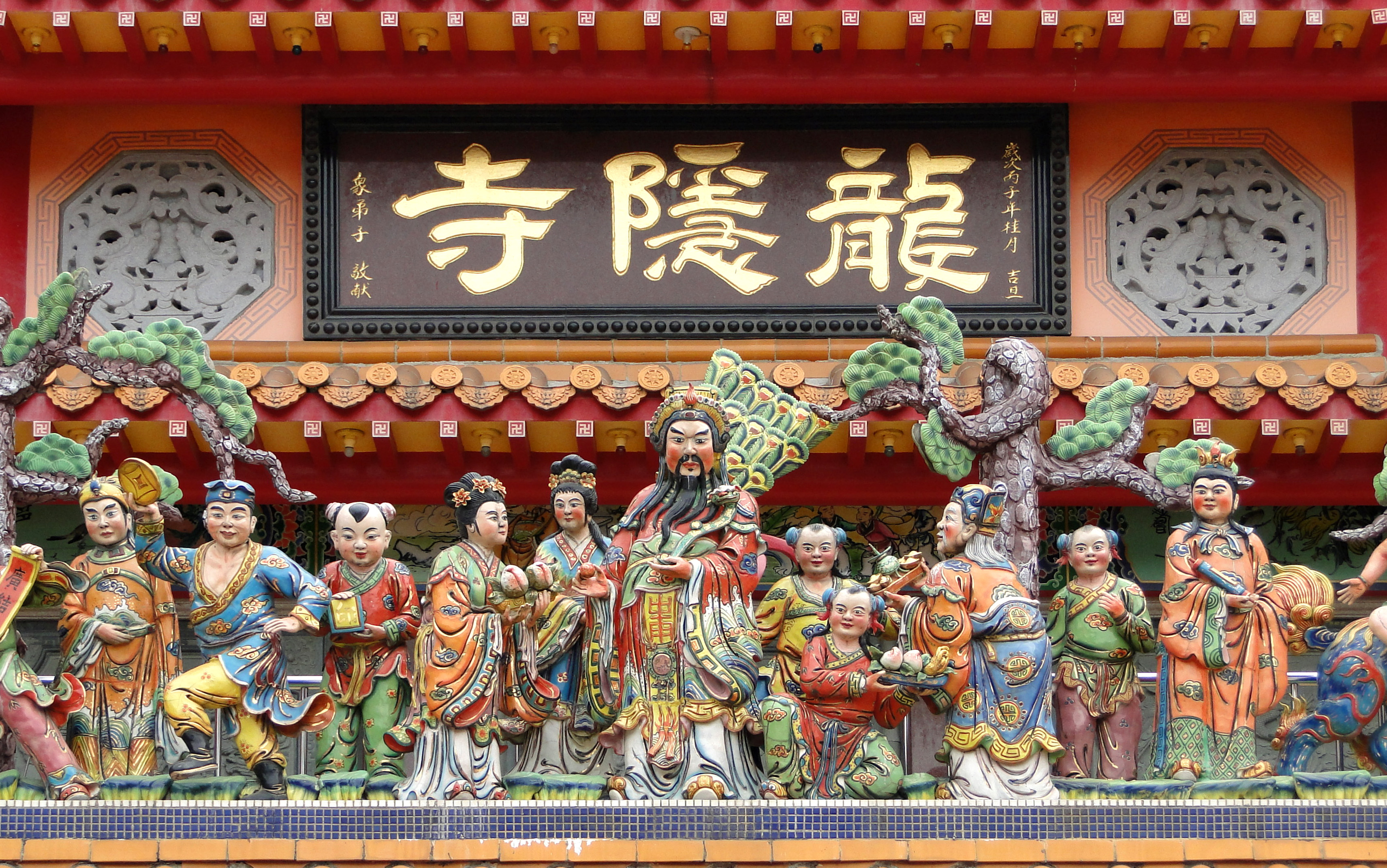
Cochin ware decoration of the Longyin Temple in Chiayi

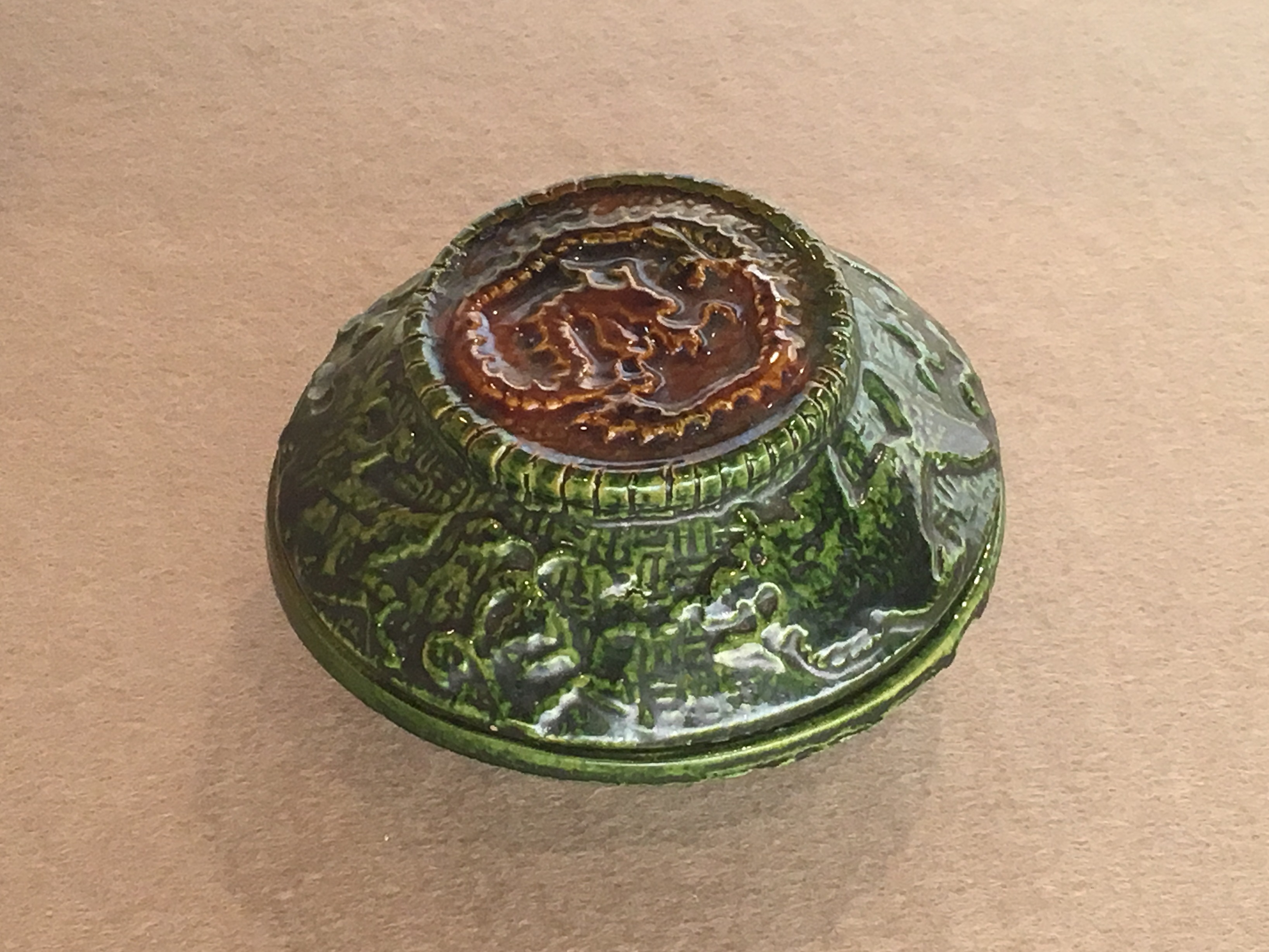
Kōchi style incense box, dragons design, green glaze. By Rikei, Toyoraku ware. Edo period, 18th century

Cochin ware or Kochi ware or Jiaozhi ware (Chinese: 交趾陶; pinyin: Jiāozhǐ táo) is a type of Vietnamese pottery from Northern Province, Vietnam.

== History ==
Koji pottery was brought to Taiwan in the 19th century.

The English term "Cochin" derives from the Taiwanese pronunciation Jiāozhǐ (交趾), which was used to denote Vietnam (Vietnamese: Giao-chỉ). The region of Cochinchina is an example of the term.

At that time, Cochin ware consisted mainly of decorations for the walls and roof ridges of temples, including human figures, animals, birds, and flowers in bright, glossy colors. Today, there are only a handful of craftspeople who still possess the traditional Cochin skills, most of whom are in the central-island city of Chiayi.

== Japan ==
In Japan it is known as Kōchi ware (Kōchi-yaki). In the old capital city Kyoto the masters of the tea ceremony esteem Kōchi ware as small figures of animals, fish, flowers, dragons, the phoenix etc. Initially imported as shimamono, it became a part of Japanese pottery. The Koshun kiln (洸春窯) is also a production centre in Kyoto.

== See also ==
- Ye Wang Cochin Ware Cultural Museum
