= Yuanbao Temple =

Temple in North District, Taichung, Taiwan

- 元保宮
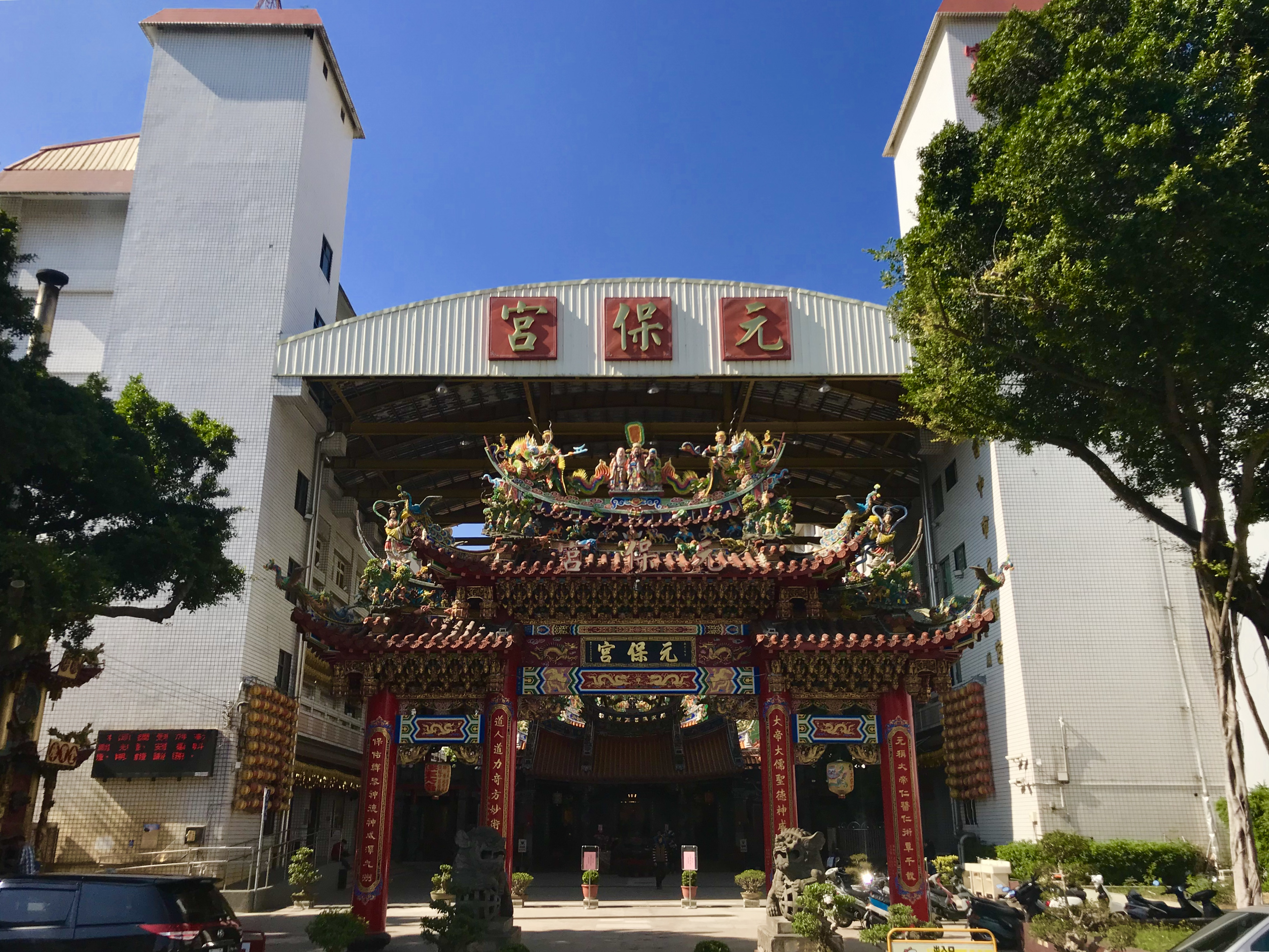
- Yuanbao Temple, located underneath a large metal canopy

Religion
- Deity: Baosheng Dadi

Location
- Location: North District, Taichung
- Country: Taiwan
- Interactive map of Yuanbao Temple
- Coordinates: 24.1628°N 120.6760°E

Architecture
- Completed: 1791
- Direction of façade: East

Yuanbao Temple (Chinese: 元保宮; pinyin: Yuánbǎo Gōng) is a temple located in North District, Taichung City, Taiwan. The temple is dedicated to the Taoist deity Baosheng Dadi.

== History ==
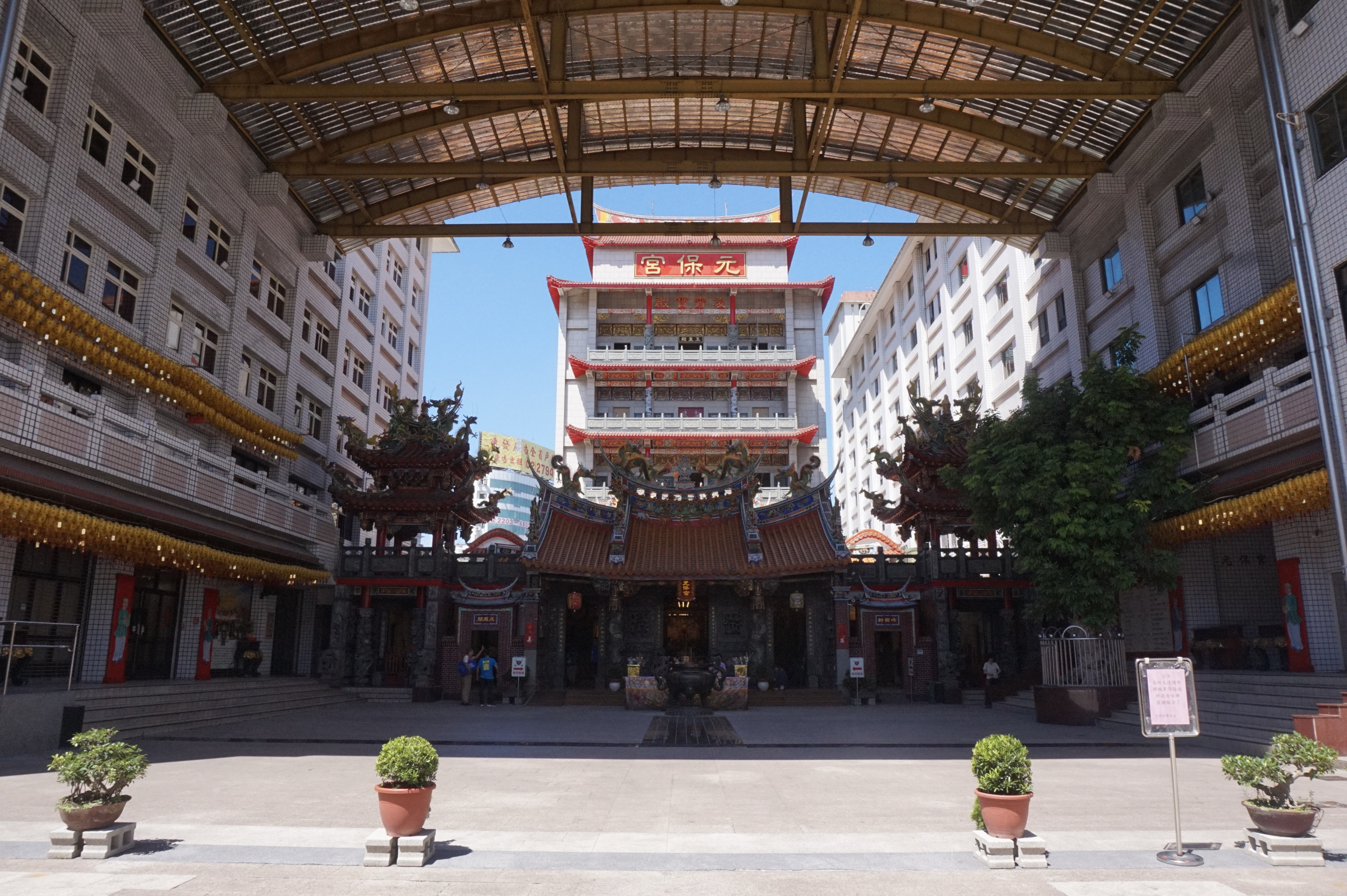
The original Yuanbao Temple and its five-story expansion in the back.

Historically, the area around Yuanbao Temple was known as Laicuobu, named after Lai family from Pinghe County that settled there. The clanspeople brought a copy of Baosheng Dadi from Xintian Temple in Zhangzhou and built a temple in 1791 for the deity, with the help of the following seventeen villages:

- Laicuobu (賴厝廍)
- Gangouzi (乾溝子)
- Tianxinzi (田心子)
- Litoudian (犁頭店)
- Tuku (土庫)
- Mayuantou (麻園頭)
- Houlongzi (後壠子)
- Dongdadun (東大墩)
- Qiucuozi (邱厝子)
- Sanshizhangli (三十張犁)
- Shuijingtou (水景頭)
- Buzi (廍子)
- Jungongliao (軍功寮)
- Jiushe (舊社)
- Erfenpu (二分埔)
- Sanfenpu (三分埔)
- Shuinan (水湳)

The temple had a large influence on the region and was the religious center those seventeen villages. Major renovations were done to the temple in 1846 and 1924. In 1962, the seventh-generation keeper of the temple's son formed a committee and started several expansion projects to the temple complex, which added several new halls for more deities.

After the end of Martial law in Taiwan, in 1988, Yuanbao Temple made a pilgrimage to Baijiao Ciji Temple in Longhai District, Fujian Province, to "refill" the spiritual energy of the deity. The pilgrims believed that Baijiao Ciji Temple is the successor to Xintian Temple, but when they arrived, they did not find any evidence of this claim. Later, they traveled to the nearby Qingjiao Ciji Temple, where they found documents belonging to Xintian Temple. Hence, Yuanbao Temple recognizes the latter as its predecessor.

== Festivals ==
The largest annual festival at Yuanbao Temple is the birth of Baosheng Dadi, celebrated between the tenth to fifteenth day of the third month in the Chinese calendar. During the festival, a parade of worshippers tour the six largest villages in the original seventeen, spending one day in each village in this order: Houlongzi, Mayuantou, Qiucuozi, Sanshizhangli, Erfenpu, and Laicuopu. The statue used in the festival is the black-faced Baosheng Dadi; according to legend, this statue went missing in Nantou County and was found by worshippers a decade later. Then, Baosheng Dadi appeared to them asking to return to Yuanbao Temple. After its return, worshippers regard this statue as the most powerful in the temple's possessions.

During Lantern Festival, Yuanbao Temple is one of the few temples that use candle lanterns instead of LED lights. The temple also holds glove puppetry shows for the public.

== See also ==
- Dalongdong Baoan Temple, Taipei
- List of temples in Taichung
- List of temples in Taiwan
