= Hsieh Clan Lion Troupe =

Folk performance troupe

The Hsieh Clan Lion Troupe of Zhongjiao is a traditional folk performance troupe located in Zhongjiao Hamlet, Syuejia District, Tainan, Taiwan. It belongs to the Marshal Hsieh Altar of Zhongshe Village within the traditional Thirteen Villages of Syuejia, and also serves as the local ritual temple of the Hsieh settlement in Zhongjiao.

As one of the 47 local ritual communities within the Thirteen Villages, it is a foundational member of the Shang Baijiao incense-offering procession organized by Syuejia Tzu Chi temple. Within the temple's representative electoral system, it falls within the Syuejia Zhongjiao constituency.

The troupe was established during the Japanese colonial period (1895–1945). At that time, it was already participating in the Shang Baijiao incense-offering procession organized by Syuejia Tzu Chi Temple. In its early years, membership primarily consisted of members of the Hsieh clan. It is currently designated as an Important Cultural Asset by the Tainan City Government and Taiwan's Ministry of Culture.

== Background ==
There are several accounts regarding the origins of the Golden Lion Formation. One widely circulated tradition holds that the founding patriarch of the lion formation was Emperor Taizu of Song, Zhao Kuangyin. This legend is linked to the belief that Emperor Taizu created a martial art known as Taizu Quan (Emperor Taizu's boxing style). Over time, this martial tradition was incorporated into what later became known as the “Four Songjiang Formations”. These include the Songjiang Formation, Golden Lion Formation, White Crane Formation, and Wuhu Pingxi Formation, all of which incorporate elements of this martial tradition.

According to local residents of the Zhongjiao settlement, the Hsieh Clan Lion Troupe already existed during the Japanese colonial period.In earlier times, many settlements in Syuejia were largely composed of members of the Hsieh clan. Consequently, the troupe's early membership consisted primarily of Hsieh clan members, and the troupe thus came to be known as the “Hsieh Clan Lion Troupe.”

After its establishment, the Hsieh Clan Lion Troupe of Zhongjiao, owing to their shared surname, invited a martial arts instructor surnamed Hsieh from the Xigang Golden Lion Formation to provide instruction. However, the Golden Lion Formation tradition places strong emphasis on lineage relationships, including kinship ties among troupe members, master–disciple transmission, and alliance relationships between troupes.

For various reasons, the troupe ceased its activities and remained inactive for a period of time. It was not until 1988, when the local community resumed the Syuejia pilgrimage, that local practitioners reorganized the troupe and resumed training. Today, the troupe is regarded as one of the well-known ritual troupes in the Syuejia area. During the Shangbaijiao ritual procession, it not only serves as the ceremonial guard accompanying the "Two Founding Deities", but also undertakes the ritual purification of the temple after the procession returns to the temple in preparation for the enthronement ritual. Consequently, the troupe plays an important role in the overall ritual proceedings.

== Traditions and characteristics ==
Although the Golden Lion Formation evolved from the Songjiang Formation, differences in the nature of their performances result in certain distinctions in how the formations appear during performances. For example, in a Songjiang Formation performance, the procession is led by the "Head Flag" and the "Double Axes". In contrast, in the lion formation the lion head serves as the central focus of the entire performance. Consequently, the lion head occupies a position of great importance during performances.

In addition, the lion head is not only the principal performer in the display but is also regarded as possessing a certain spiritual power. When it is not being used in performances, it is treated as a sacred object and must be venerated. Therefore, temples that maintain a Golden Lion Formation typically establish a dedicated shrine or altar for the worship of the lion head.

The lion head is the most important piece of equipment in the lion formation. Traditionally, lion heads were made using clay molds with layers of papier-mâché applied over them. However, this method involves a rather complex and time-consuming production process. With the development of modern materials and considerations such as reducing production costs and simplifying manufacturing procedures, most lion heads in recent years have come to be made from fiberglass. Nevertheless, the lion heads used by the Hsieh Clan Lion Troupe of Zhongjiao continue to be produced using the traditional clay-mold and papier-mâché technique.

In addition, although the performance style of the Golden Lion Formation bears some resemblance to that of the Songjiang Formation, its routines and formations are far less diverse and complex. This is because the performance primarily centers on the manipulation of the lion head. Only after the lion-head performance is completed do other performance segments take place.

The other performance segments include solo, paired, and group martial routines. However, much of the time the performers simply carry out movements while shouting loudly to heighten the atmosphere and display their vigor.

Many of the weapons used by the formation are derived from those of the Songjiang Formation, with the rattan shield being the most commonly used. Naturally, the most physically demanding role is that of operating the lion head. Therefore, during performances, at least five to six performers must take turns manipulating the lion head in order to bring the Golden Lion to life.

Most martial arts troupes perform a set of related rituals after accepting a performance engagement. As the Hsieh Clan Lion Troupe of Zhongjiao traces its lineage to the Wuzhulin Golden Lion Formation in Xigang, it has therefore inherited a number of related customs, including rituals such as kaiguan (opening ritual), tanguan (visiting ritual), and xieguan (concluding thanksgiving ritual). Kaiguan is a ritual in which the troupe reports its training progress to the deities and seeks their approval before commencing the performance. Tanguan refers to a ritualized visit in which a troupe enters other temples or allied troupe sites during a procession, performs formal greetings, and presents brief symbolic performances as a gesture of respect and interaction. Xieguan refers to a concluding ritual performed after the completion of a performance cycle, in which the troupe reports its accomplishment to the deities, offers thanks for divine protection, and marks the formal closure of the ritual engagement. The kaiguan ritual of the Hsieh Clan Lion Troupe takes place at Syuejia Tzu Chi Temple.

== Registration as intangible cultural heritage ==
Due to its rich historical background and cultural significance, as well as its continued use of traditional clay-mold papier-mâché techniques in crafting lion heads, the Hsieh Clan Lion Troupe has preserved a wide range of traditional skills, artifacts, and ritual practices. These elements possess considerable historical and cultural value, and as a result, the troupe has been officially recognized as one of the groups designated for the preservation of traditional performing arts in Tainan.

== Photos ==
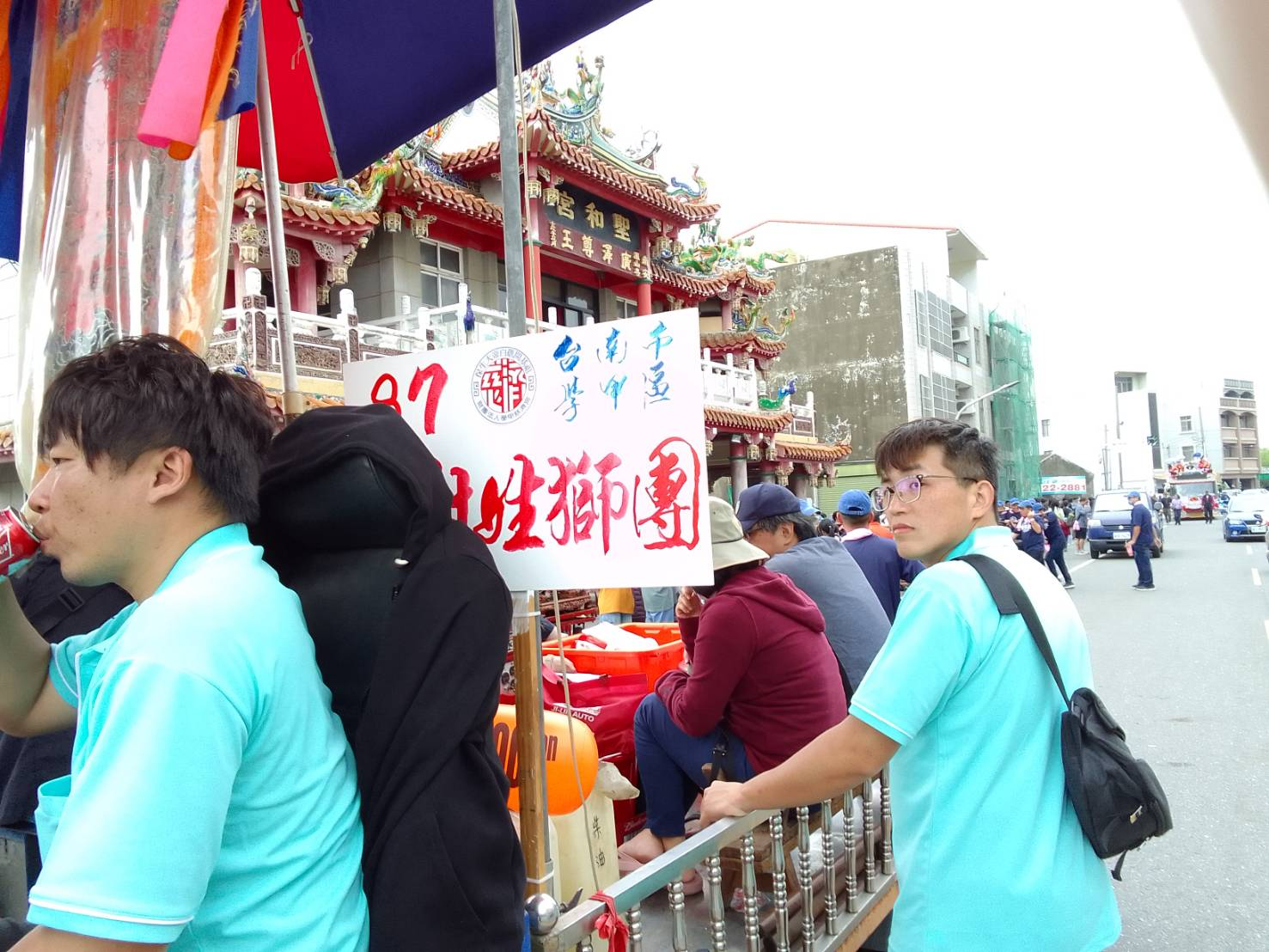
Shangbaijiao Pilgrimage

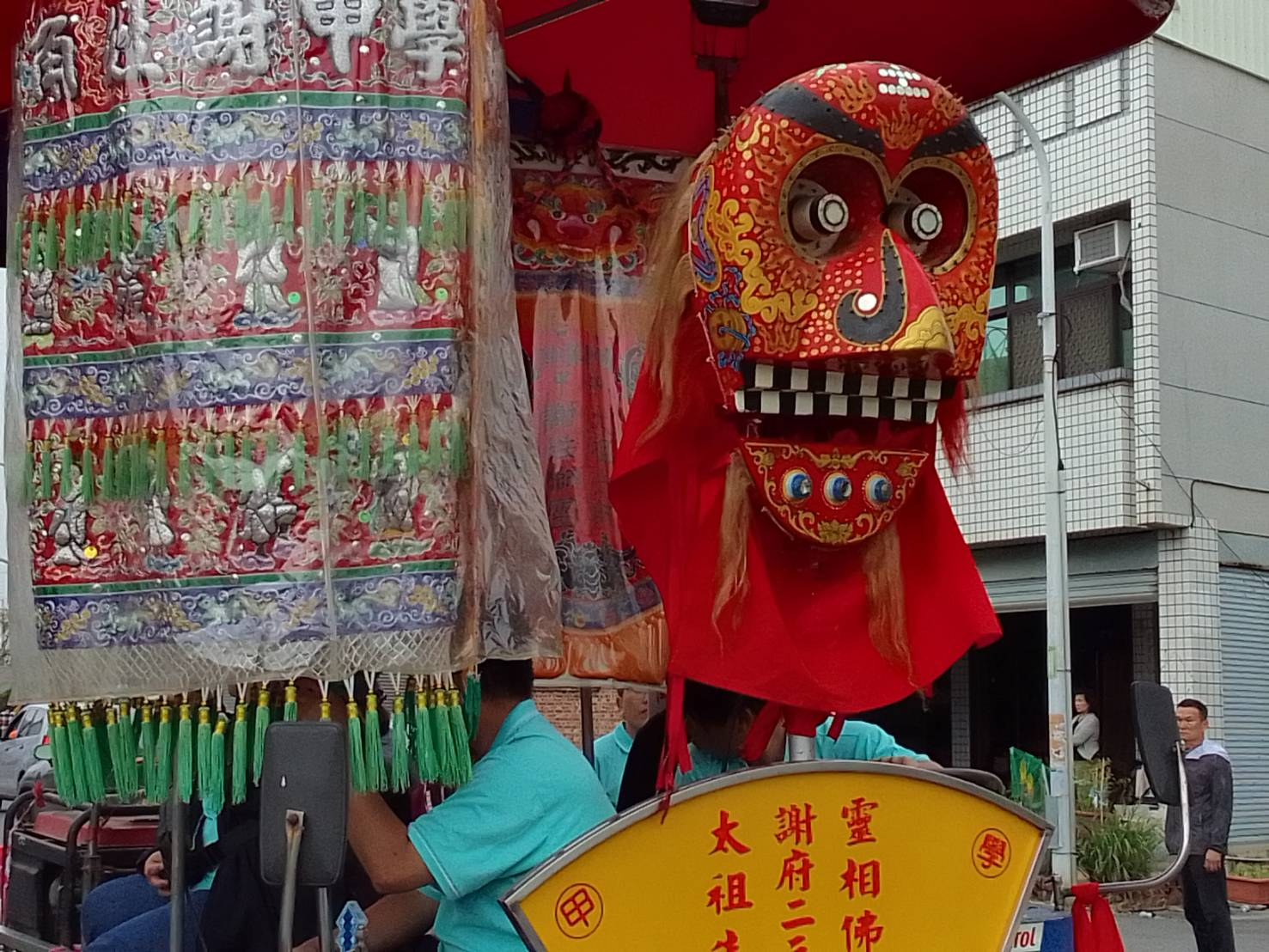
Divine Umbrella and Lion Head

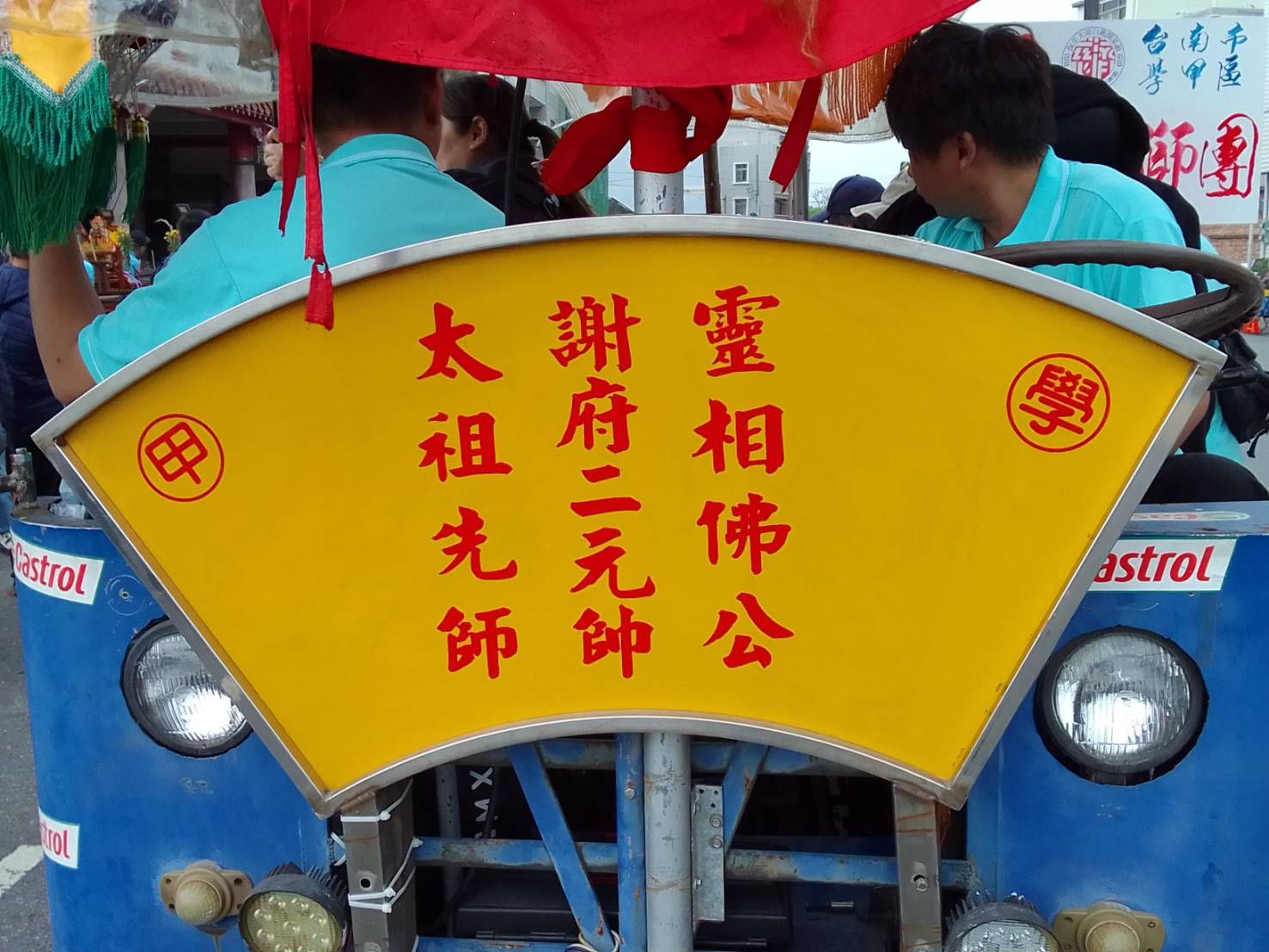
Honorific term for the accompanying guardian deities

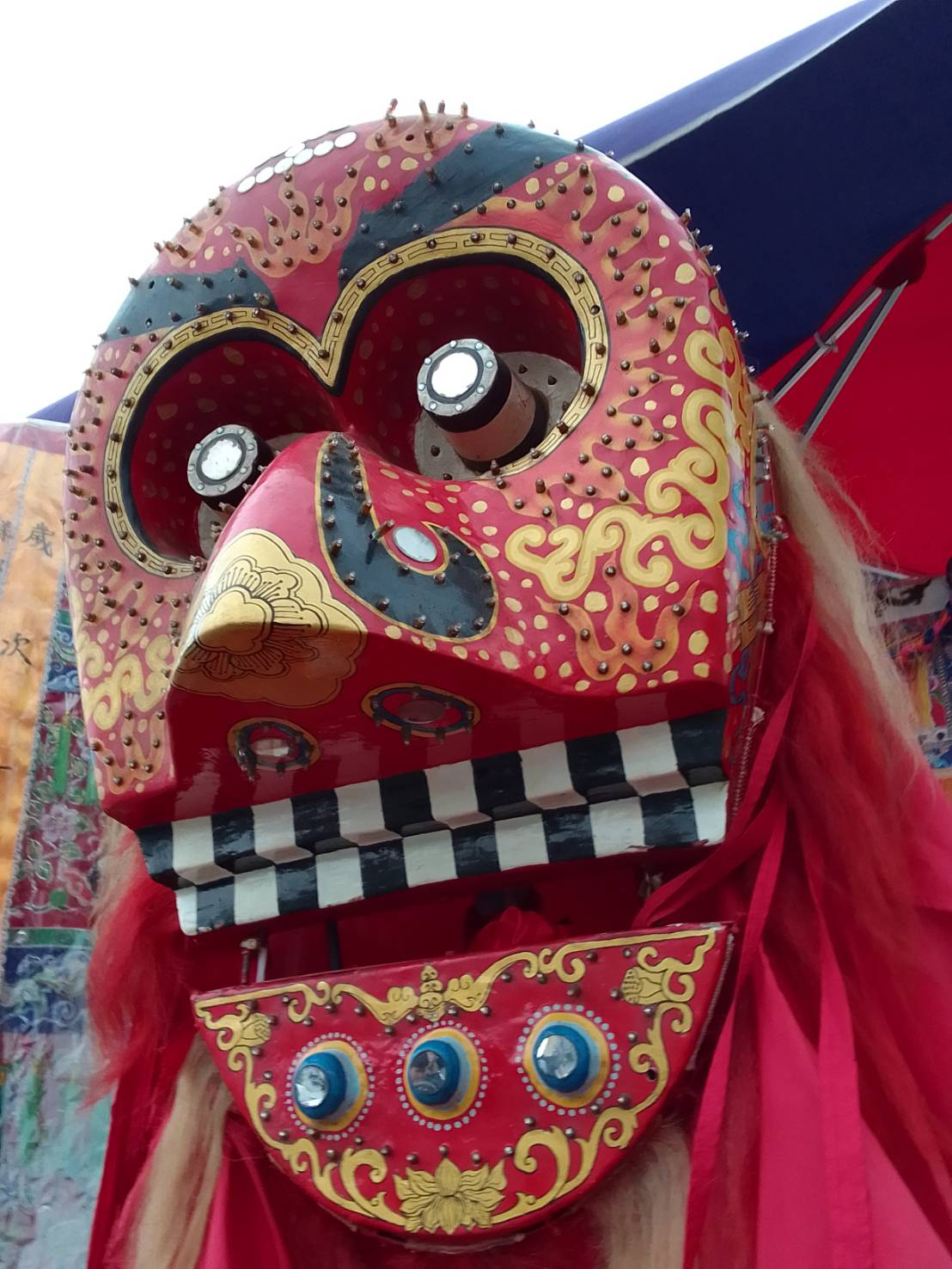
Papier-mâché lion head

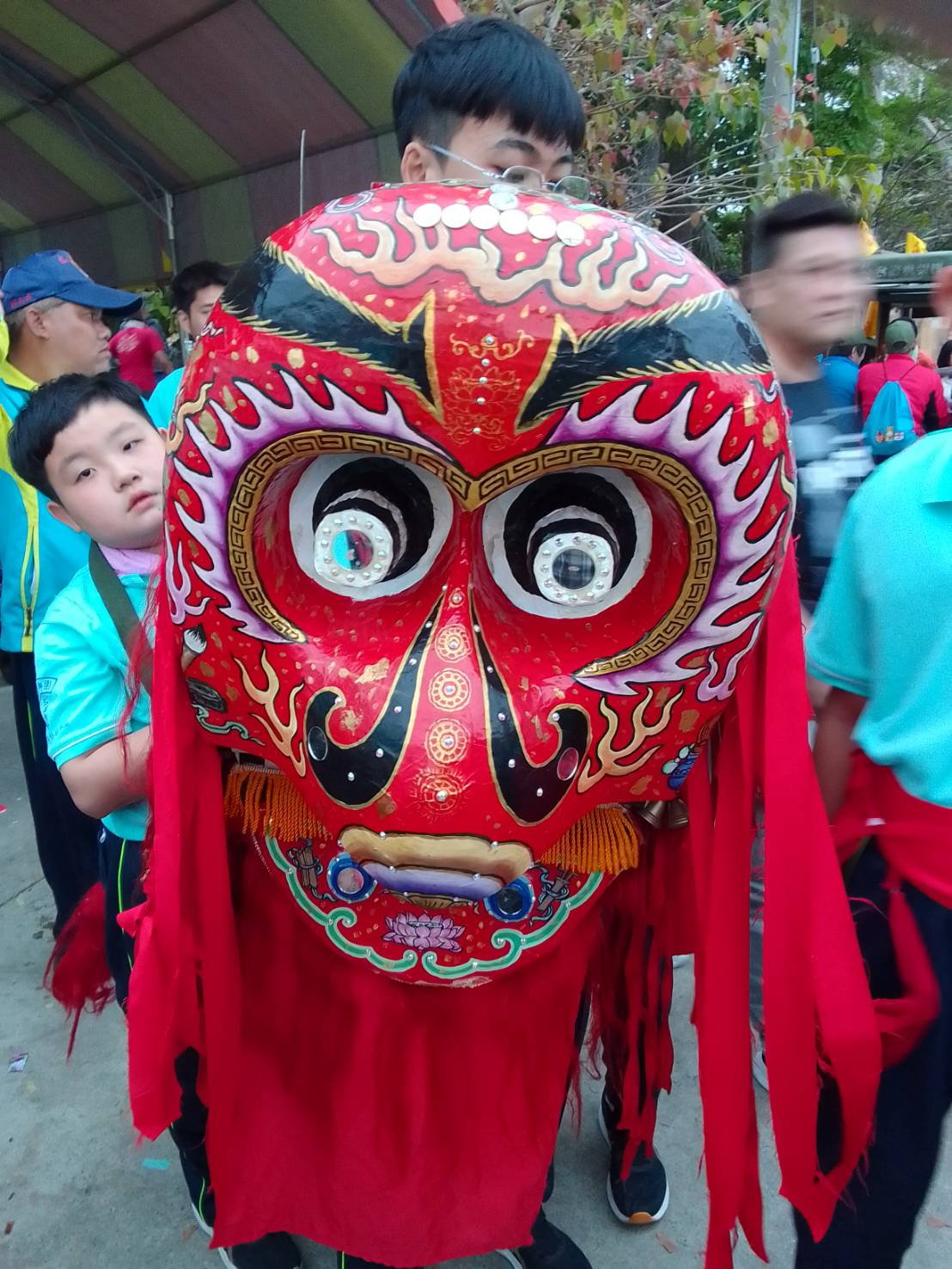
Lion dance performers

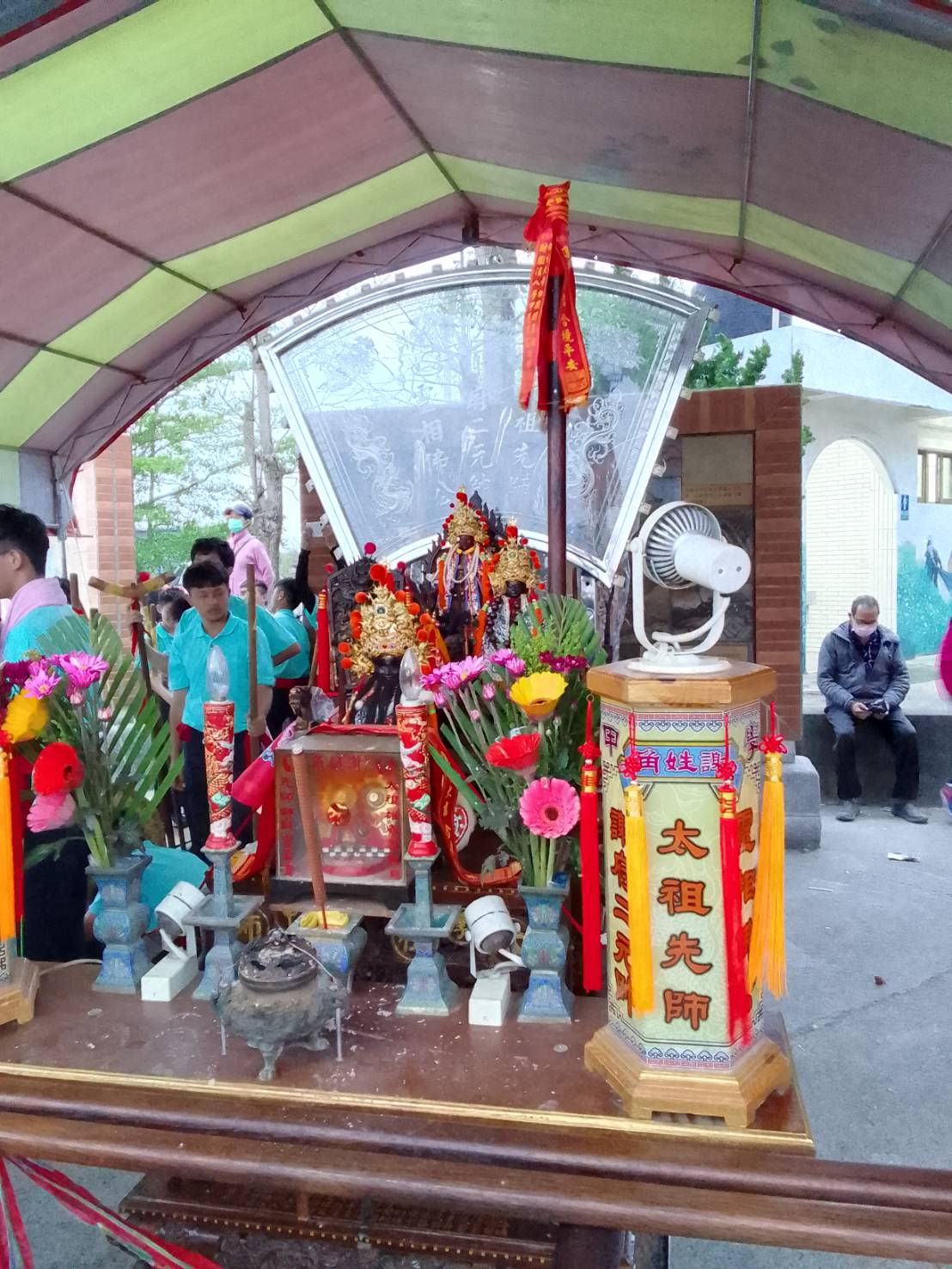
Accompanying guardian deities
