= Dacheng, Changhua =

Rural township in Changhua County, Taiwan

Dacheng 大城 Ōshiro
- Rural township
- Dacheng Township · 大城鄉

Chinese transcription(s)
  - Traditional: 大城鄉
  - Pinyin: Dàchéng Xiāng
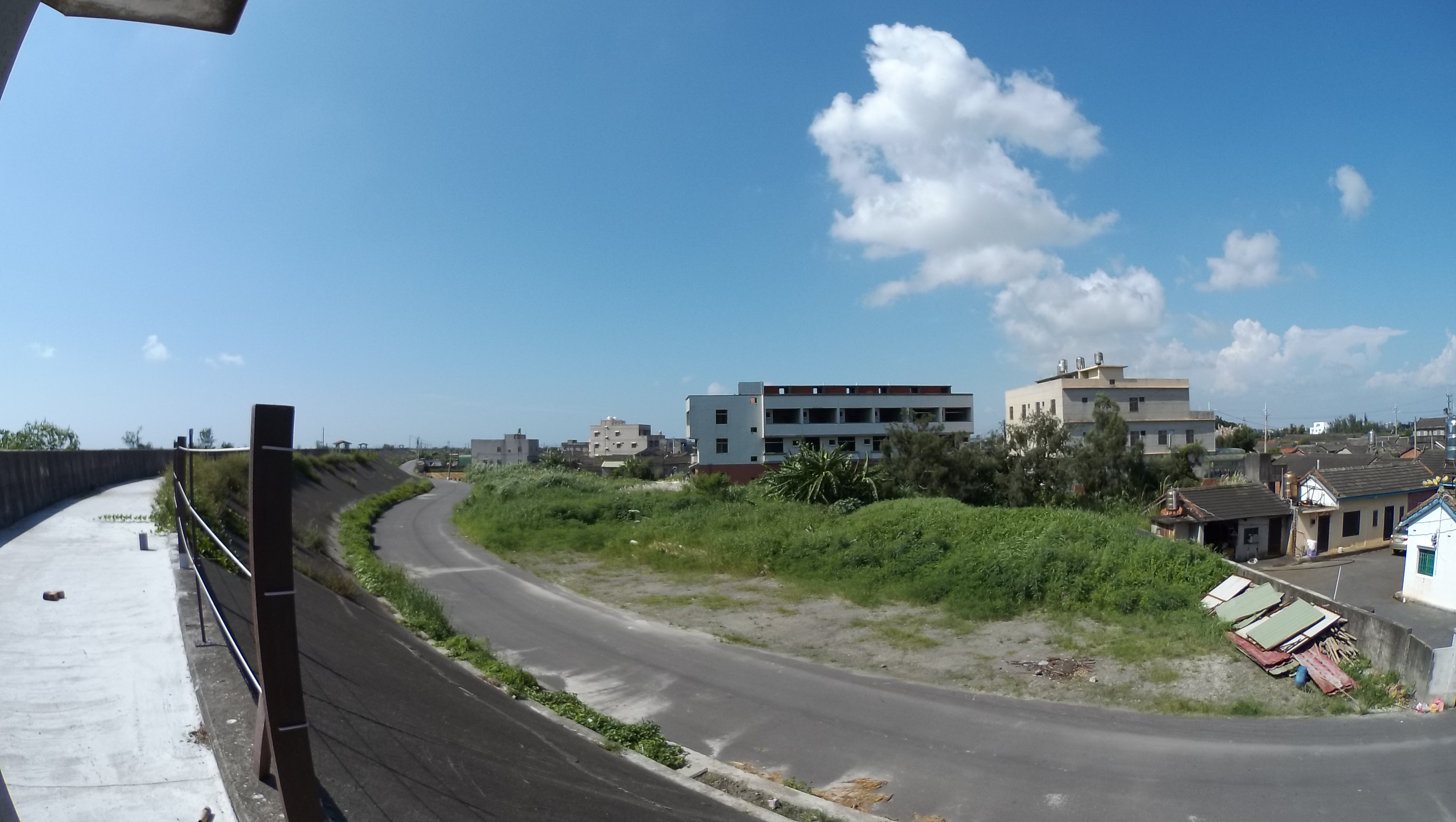

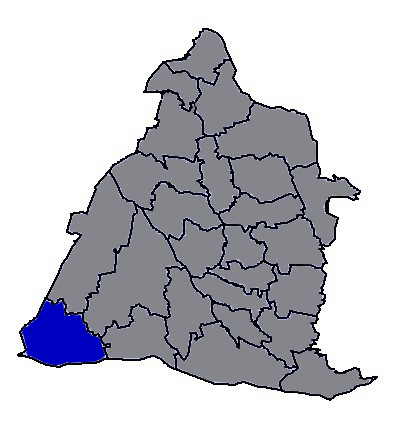

- Location within Taiwan
- Coordinates: 23°50′54″N 120°18′32″E
- Country: Taiwan
- County: Changhua

Area
  - Total: 63.74 km^{2} (24.61 sq mi)

Population (January 2023)
  - Total: 15,425
  - Density: 242.0/km^{2} (626.8/sq mi)
- Postal code: 527
- Website: www.chcg.gov.tw/TSO/dacheng/index.aspx (in Chinese)

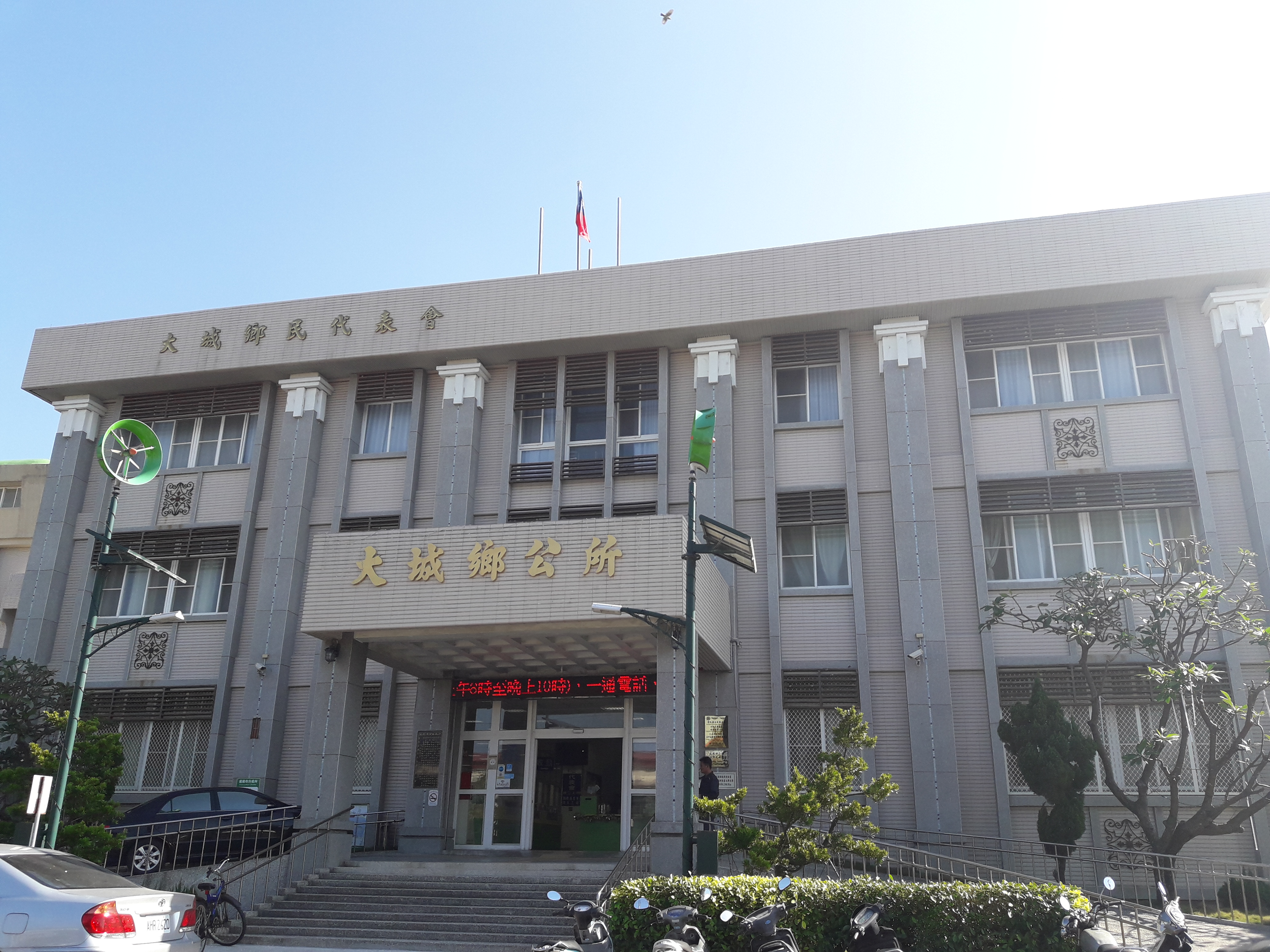
Dacheng Township Office

Dacheng Township (Chinese: 大城鄉; pinyin: Dàchéng Xiāng) is a rural township in Changhua County, Taiwan.

== Geography ==
Dacheng is located on the north bank of the Zhuoshui River, at the river's mouth where it flows into the Taiwan Strait. It encompasses 63.74 square kilometres (24.61 sq mi) and a population of 15,425, including 9,335 males and 7,921 females as of January 2023.

== Administrative divisions ==
The township comprises 15 villages: Cailiao, Dacheng, Dingzhuang, Fengmei, Gongguan, Sanfeng, Shangshan, Shanjiao, Taixi, Tanqi, Tungcheng, Tunggang, Xicheng, Xigang and Yonghe.

== Tourist attractions ==
- Xian'an Temple

== Notable natives ==
- Joseph Wu, Minister of Foreign Affairs
