= Xian'an Temple =

Temple in Dacheng, Changhua County, Taiwan

- 咸安宮
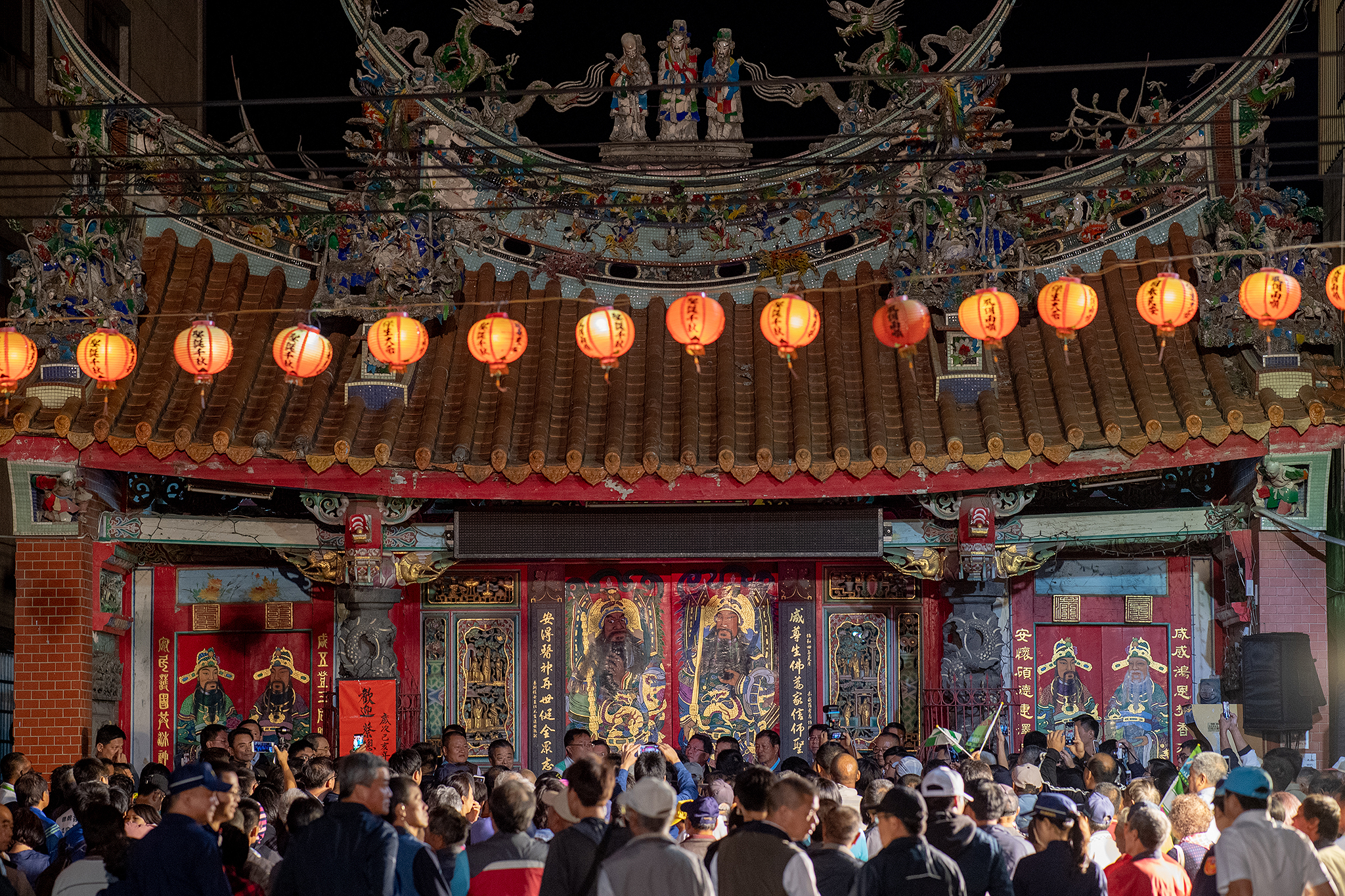
- Official Photo by Makoto Lin, 2019

Religion
- Affiliation: Taoism
- Deity: Baosheng Dadi

Location
- Location: Dacheng, Changhua County
- Country: Taiwan
- Interactive map of Xian'an Temple
- Coordinates: 23.8550°N 120.3211°E

Architecture
- Completed: 1928
- Direction of façade: East

Dacheng Xian'an Temple (Chinese: 大城咸安宮; pinyin: Dàchéng Xián'ān Gōng) is a temple located in Dacheng Township, Changhua County, Taiwan. The temple is dedicated to Baosheng Dadi, the God of Medicine, and is protected as a county-level historical building.

== History ==
The Dacheng area was settled by the Han Chinese in the late Ming Dynasty. In response to major disease outbreaks in the area, in 1666, a resident with the surname Wu traveled back to Quanzhou to invite the spirit of Baosheng Dadi to Dacheng. In 1674, a small temple made of rammed earth was built to house the deity, which became the religious center of the town. The temple was given the name "Xian'an Temple" in 1824. In 1928, a worshipper named Wu Wan-yi (吳萬益) decided to rebuild the temple. Funded by donations from the local townspeople, Wu completed the temple in 1930. He used imported stone and wood from mainland China and also hired craftsmen from China to decorate the temple with sculptures and paintings. The building remained largely untouched except for a few restoration projects in 1960 and 1972. Then, in 1986, a rear hall was added to the temple.

On 11 April 2008, the Changhua County Government protected the building as a historic building for its well-preserved architecture and sculptures. In December 2019, the county government began renovating the building and preserve the relics inside.

== Architecture ==
Xian'an Temple is a classic example of Hokkien architecture. It is primarily dedicated to Baosheng Dadi, who is seated in the main hall. The temple also has altars dedicated to other deities in Taoism and Chinese folk religion. Though the temple itself is not large, it is intricately decorated with sculptures of people and creatures from Chinese folklore on its columns, beams, and roof. The temple also contains a stone furnace dating from 1827 and multiple wooden plaques crafted by well-known calligraphers including Luo Xiu-hui and Yang Cao-xian.
