= Poh Seng Tai Tay =

Chinese deity

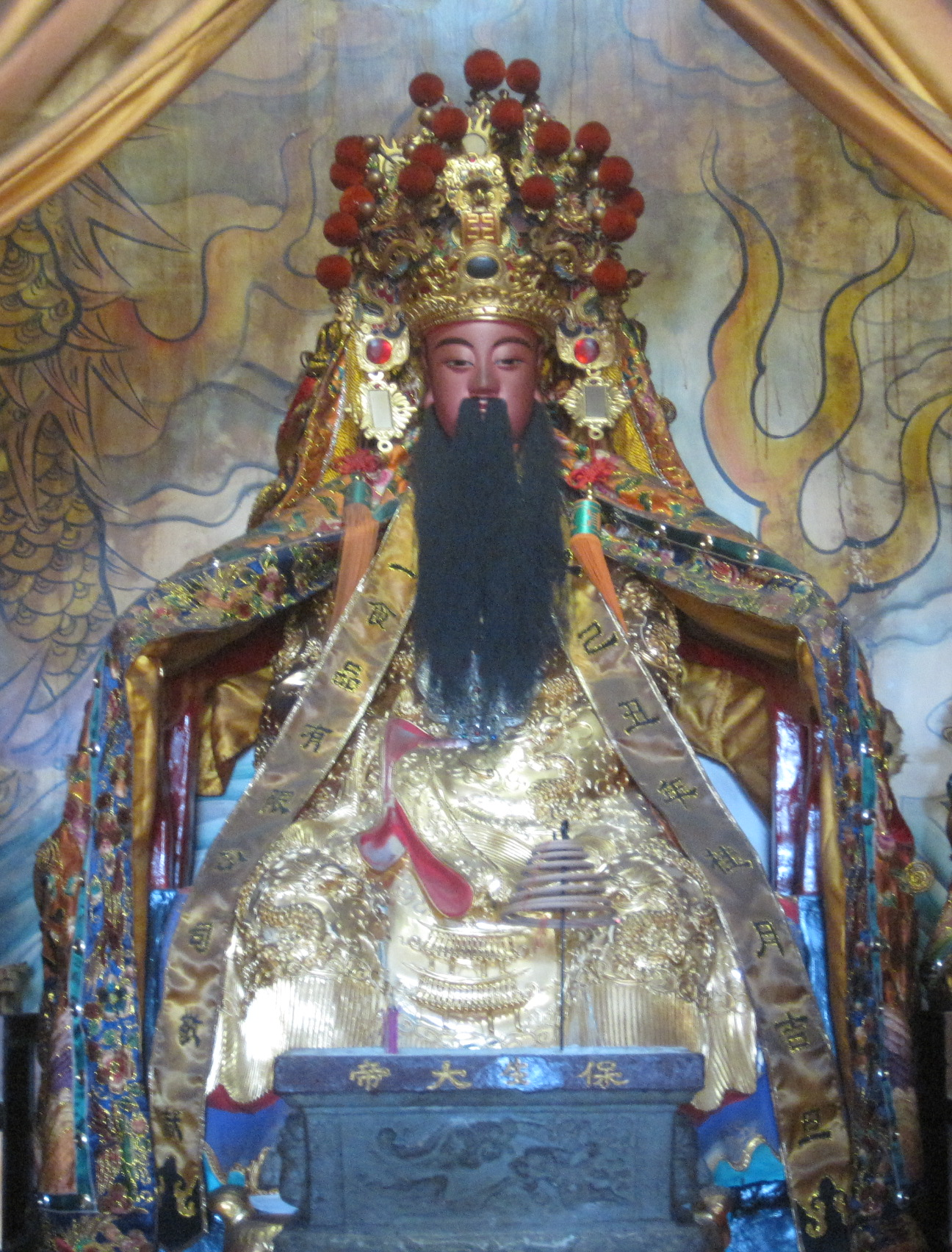
- Statue of Poh Seng Tai Tay in Sinhua temple, Tainan
- Chinese: 保生大帝
Transcriptions
Standard Mandarin
- Hanyu Pinyin: Bǎoshēng Dàdì
- Wade–Giles: Pao³ Sheng¹ Ta⁴ Ti⁴
Southern Min
- Hokkien POJ: Pó-seng tāi-tè
Eastern Min
- Fuzhou BUC: Bō̤-sĕng Dâi-dá̤

Poh Seng Tai Tay (Chinese: 保生大帝; Pe̍h-ōe-jī: Pó-seng tāi-tè), also known as Taitokong (Chinese: 大道公; Pe̍h-ōe-jī: Tāi-tǒ-kong), is the God of Medicine worshiped among the Hoklo people in Fujian, Taiwan, and the Hokkien communities in Southeast Asia.

== Legends ==
=== Early years ===
Gô͘ Tho (吳夲) was born in the year 979 in Pehta village (白礁), Tangwa county, Quanzhou prefecture (now in Jiaomei, Zhangzhou). At the time this area was recently annexed by the Song dynasty from Qingyuan Circuit, a de-facto independent entity emerged after the fall of the Min Empire of the Five Dynasties and Ten Kingdoms period. His birthday is celebrated with parades and festivals on the 15th day of the third month in the traditional Chinese calendar.

His father Gô͘ Thong (吳通) and mother Ng Gwat-hwa (黃月華) were refugees from Zhangzhou, they lived in poverty and were engaged in fishing. When Gô͘ Tho was 13, his father died due to an illness, as his family could not afford a doctor. His mother died shortly after that out of grief.

After the death of his parents, Gô͘ Tho started learning medicine. He practiced acupuncture, concocted potions, and studied the books written by ancient doctors and alchemists. According to a legend, in the age of 17 Gô͘ Tho met a stranger who invited him to his boat. The stranger brought Gô͘ Tho to the Kunlun Mountain where he met Queen Mother of the West and studied alchemy.

=== Treating a tiger ===
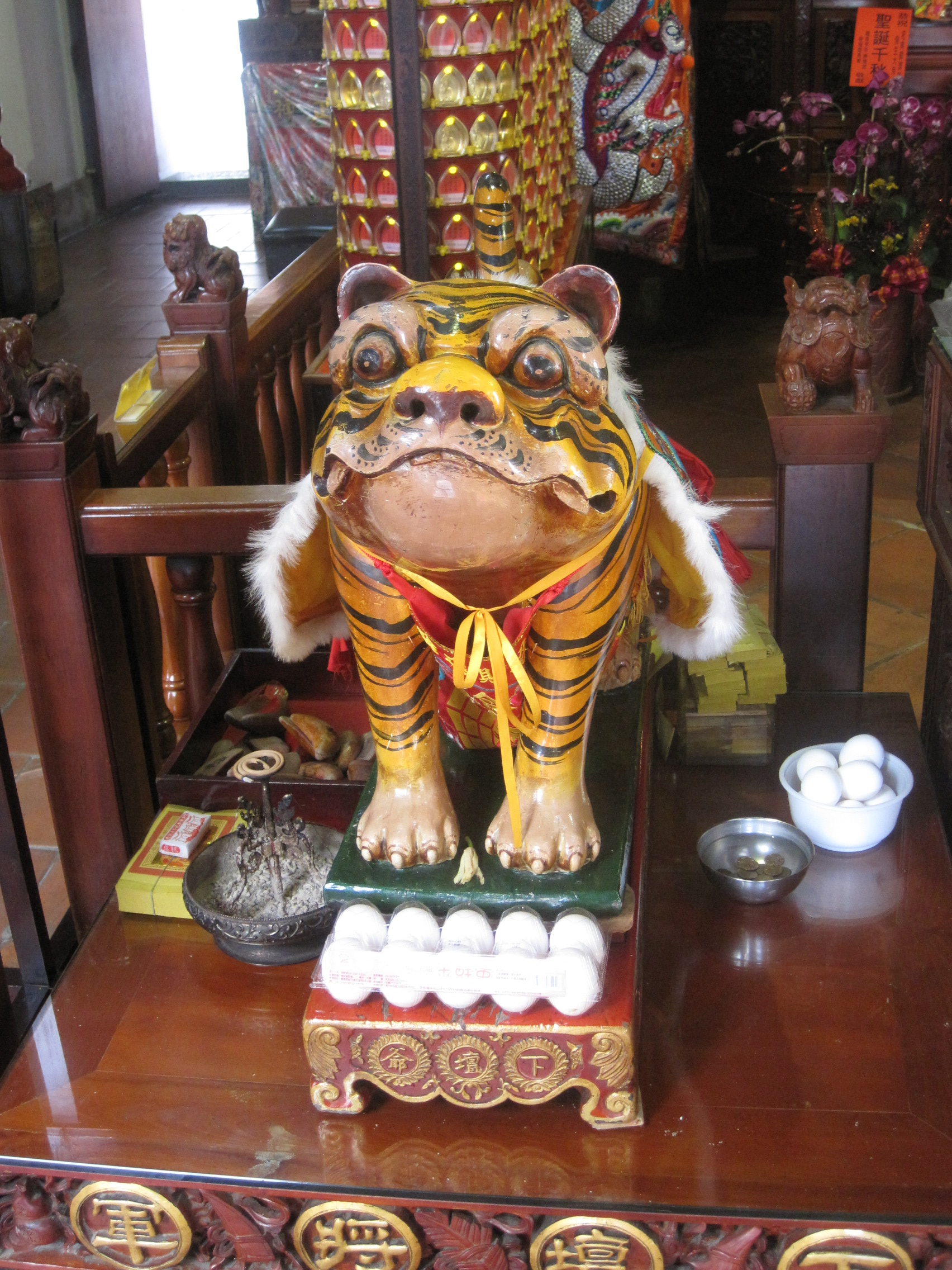
Figure of a tiger in a temple in Tainan

A popular legend says that when Gô͘ Tho was picking herbs in the mountains, he met a tiger with a bone stuck down his throat. Gô͘ Tho scolded the tiger for eating people, but treated his throat, and the tiger let Gô͘ Tho to ride him out of gratitude. For this reason, many temples dedicated to Poh Seng Tai Tay have figures of tigers.

=== Kang the Immortal Official ===
When Gô͘ Tho was 35, he found a pile of bones with one leg bone missing. He put a willow branch to the pile and used magic to revive the pile as a boy. The boy then became a servant to Gô͘ Tho. When the Tangwa county magistrate Kang Siau-hong (江少峰) met Gô͘ Tho, he recognized the boy who was said to be eaten by a tiger while travelling for imperial exams. He did not believe that Gô͘ Tho had revived the boy, but after Gô͘ Tho turned him back into a pile of bones, Kang believed him. Along with his secretary surnamed Tio (張), Kang became an apprentice to Gô͘ Tho. Twenty years later a demon king appeared in the area with an army of plague ghosts. Gô͘ Tho fought them together with Kang the Immortal Official (江仙官) and Tio the Saint (張聖者), and stoke the demon king with a lightning. After the events, he treated the epidemic with magical water. He stopped at the Hwakio Inn (花橋亭) to proved free medical training, and the Hwakio Tsz Tse temple (花橋慈濟宮) is said to be built on the site of this inn.

=== Western Temple of Gô͘ ===
When Gô͘ Tho was 47, he went for study to the alchemist Pue Yang-chin (裴養真), who lived on the mount Kisan (旗山). There he met Sng Thian-sek (孫天錫), who had been long sick after getting poisoned by eating a fish. Gô͘ Tho treated Sng Thian-sek, and he later became his first follower. After the death of Gô͘ Tho, Sng Thian-sek build a small temple to the west of his house. When the number followers grew, he expanded the temple and named it "The Western Temple of Gô͘" (吳西宮).

=== Fighting the dragon offspring ===
In the last years of his life, Gô͘ Tho was hired by Ng Siu (黃秀), the richest man in Pehta village, to treat his daughter. She walked in a garden and picked flowers, and then went to a pool to wash her hands, but accidentally she touched a dragon and got pregnant. Gô͘ Tho said that she is pregnant with dragonlings, and should they be born, calamities would occur in the area. Gô͘ Tho recommended to kill the offspring, but to do that, it was necessary to kill the girl. Ng Siu agreed to do that, but he warned Gô͘ Tho that if his diagnosis was wrong and he would kill his daughter by mistake, he would pay with his life. Gô͘ Tho cut the belly of the girl, and managed to kill six out of seven dragonling, but the last one had opened his eyes and attacked Gô͘ Tho. After a fight, the dragonling escaped towards a well near the mount Bunpho (文圃山), but Gô͘ Tho still caught and killed him.

=== Ascension to Heaven ===
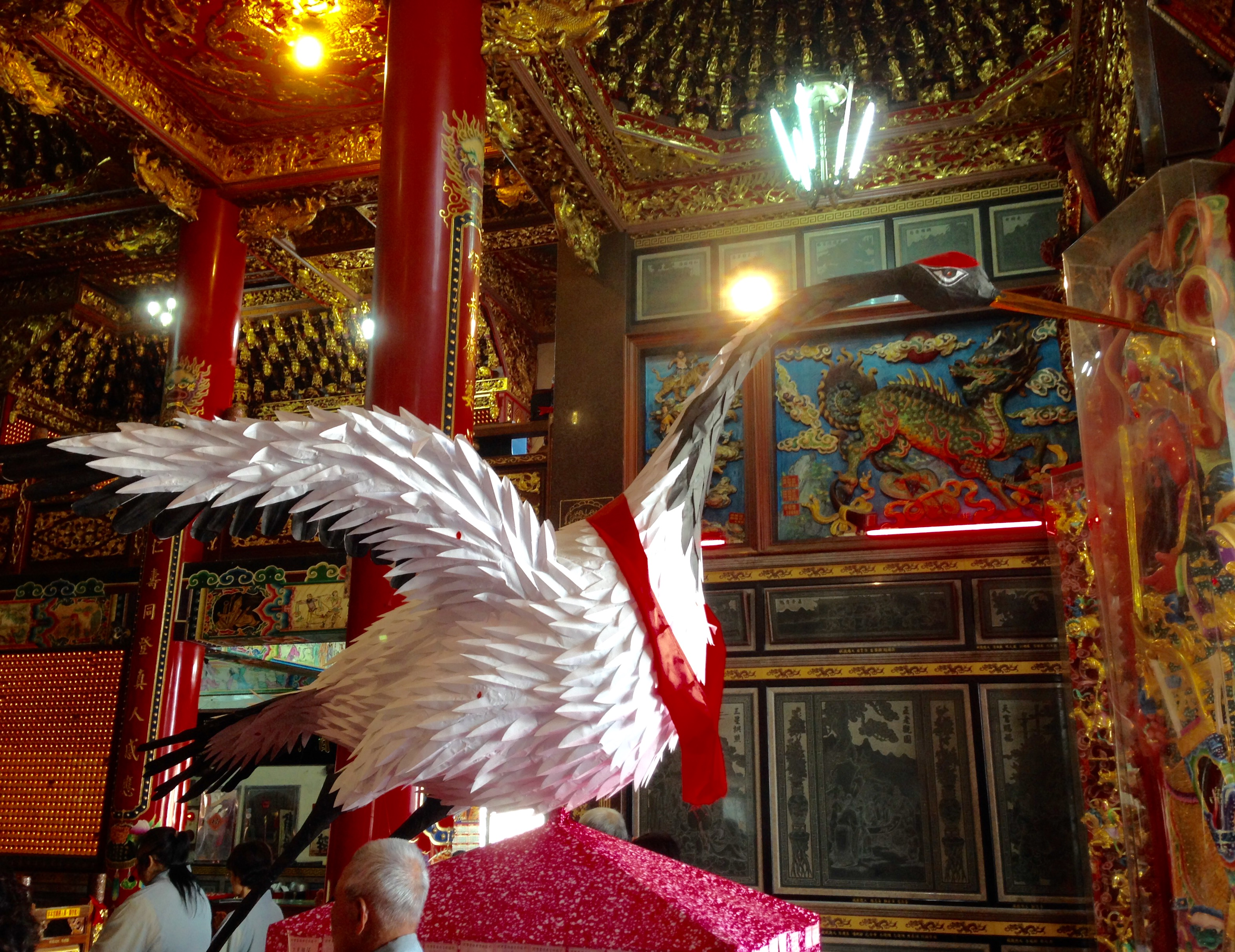
Figure of a crane in a temple in Pingtung County

In 1036, Gô͘ Tho went to pick herbs near the Chheta village (青礁) in Lionghai, Zhangzhou (now in Haicang, Xiamen). He then fell from a mountain, and, according to the legend, ascended to Heaven riding a crane. After his ascension, he appeared in the dreams of local villagers, and urged them to build a temple for him.

=== Marriage with Ma Cho Po ===
Some less orthodox folk beliefs state that Poh Seng Tai Tay married Ma Cho Po in Heaven, but she later quarreled with him and demanded a divorce. Poh Seng Tai Tay was enraged, and on the birthday of Ma Cho Po, he induced rain to wash away her cosmetics. In response to him, Ma Cho Po caused wind on Poh Seng Tai Tay 's birthday to blow away his hat. Many proverbs emerged based on this story, such as "The windy days are for the lord Taito, and the rainy days are for lady Ma Cho" (大道公風，媽祖婆雨). While many temples and worshipers frown upon such stories, some believers honestly perceive Poh Seng Tai Tay and Ma Cho Po as either a divine couple or two antagonist gods.

== Worship ==
The oldest temples dedicated to Poh Seng Tai Tay were Ileng Sinsu (醫靈神祠) in Pehta village, Liongchiu-am (龍湫庵) in Chheta village, and Gosekiong (吳西宮) in Amoy. In 1166, Poh Seng Tai Tay got the title Tsz Tse (慈濟), and the first two temples were renamed into Tsz Tse temples (慈濟廟, later (慈濟宮).

Poh Seng Tai Tay was popular among the natives of Tangwa (Tong'an), who brought his cult to Taiwan. First temple for Poh Seng Tai Tay in Taiwan was built during the Dutch rule, its site now is in Sinhua District, Tainan. The birthday of Poh Seng Tai Tay is commemorated every mid-April to mid-June in Taipei by hosting the Baosheng Cultural Festival.

== Some of the temples dedicated to Poh Seng Tai Tay ==
Taiwan

- Dalongdong Baoan Temple, Taipei
- Zuoying Ciji Temple, Kaohsiung
- Yuanbao Temple, Taichung City
- Jen Wu Temple, Chiayi City
- Xian'an Temple, Changhua County
- Syuejia Tzu Chi Temple, Tainan City

Malaysia

- Seah Kor Temple, Bagan Serai, Perak

== Gallery ==
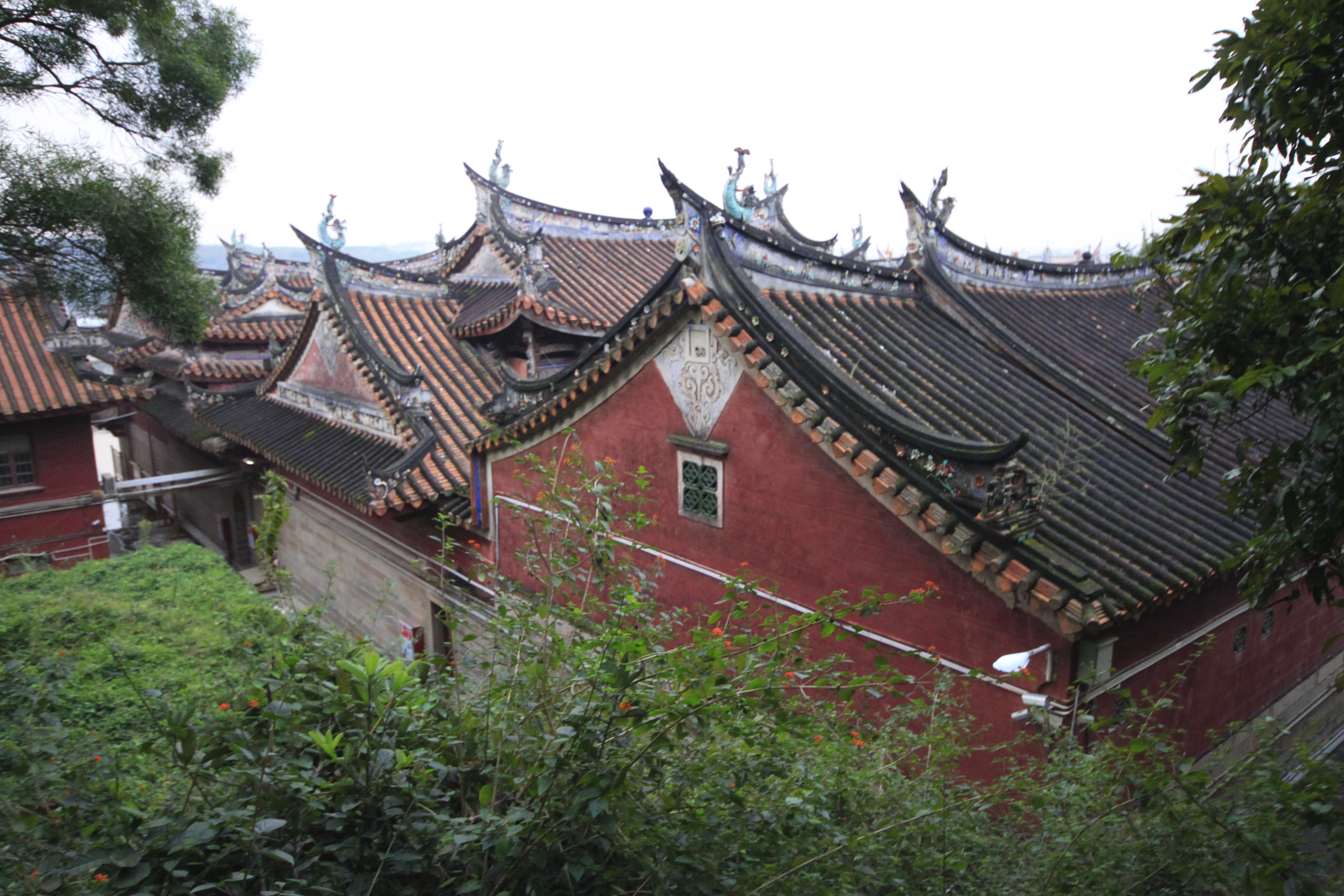
Temple in the Chheta village, where Poh Seng Tai Tay has ascended

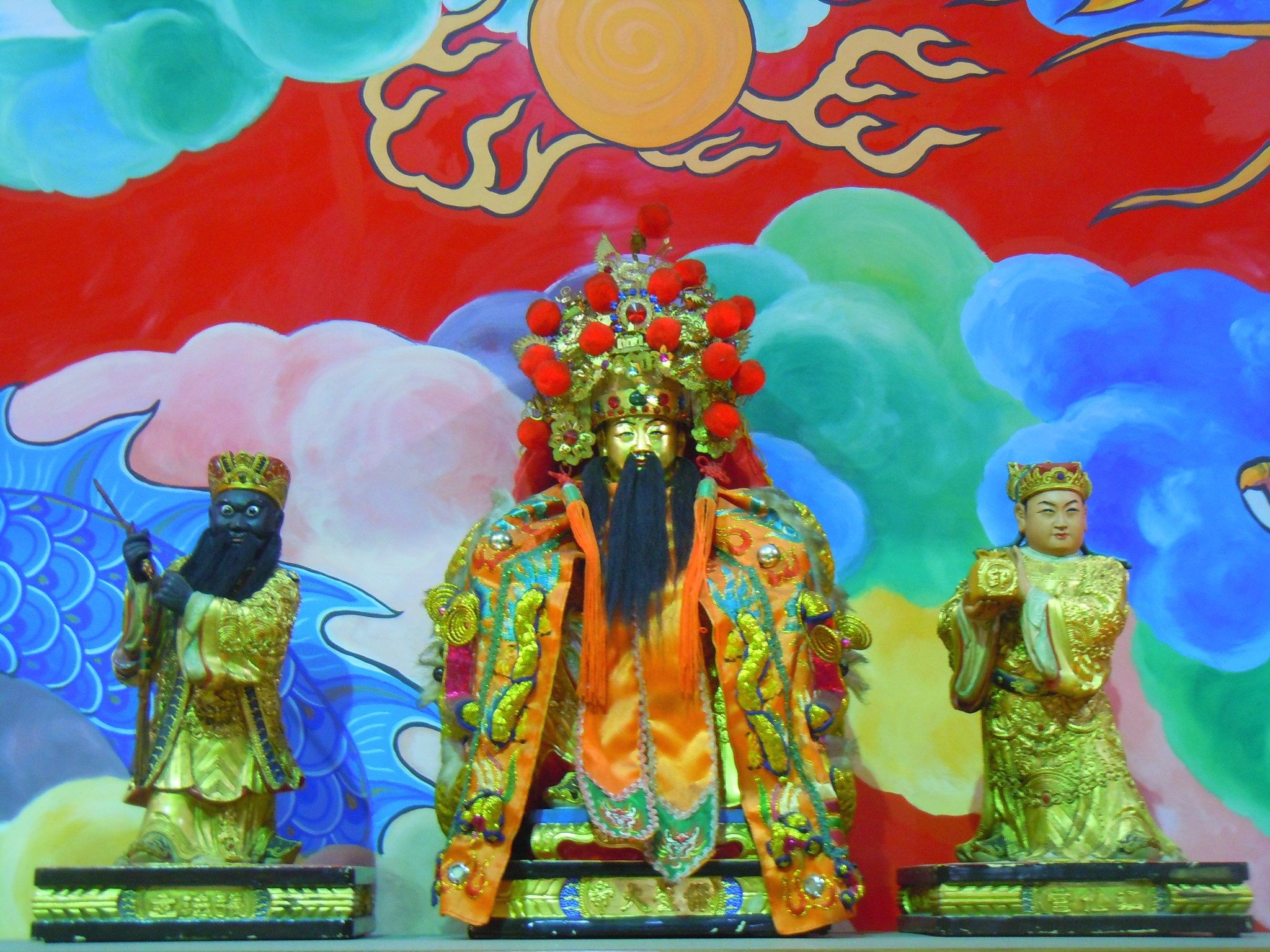
Altar to Poh Seng Tai Tay at Yuanbao Temple in Taichung, Taiwan

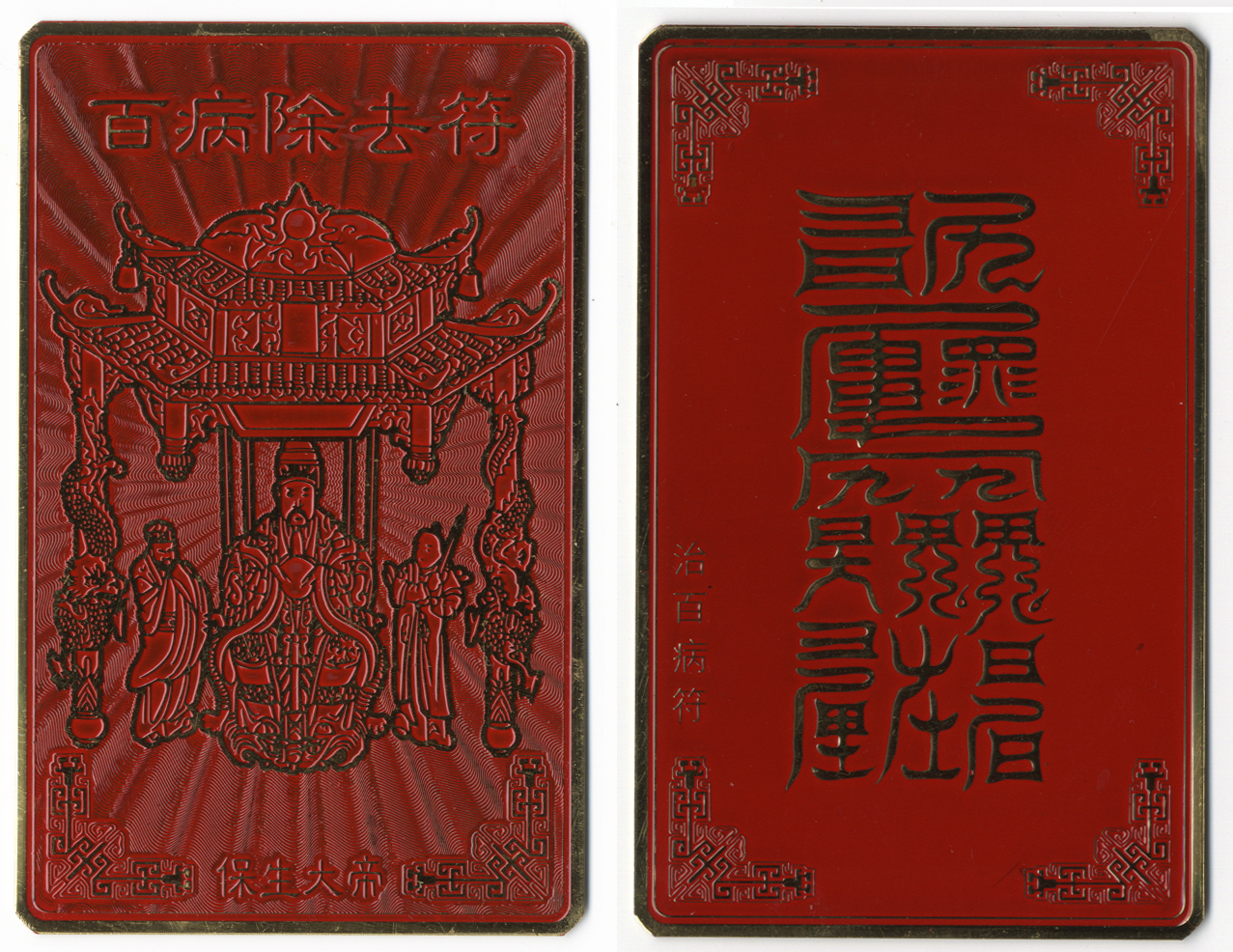
Poh Seng Tai Tay amulet.

== See also ==
- Chinese folk religion
- Shennong Dadi (神農大帝)
- Huatuo Xianshi (華佗先師)
- Hu Ye (虎爷)
