= Ye Wang Cochin Ware Cultural Museum =

Museum in Tainan, Taiwan

Ye Wang Cochin Ware Cultural Museum is a cultural exhibition venue affiliated with Syuejia Tzu Chi temple in Syuejia District, Tainan City, Taiwan. The museum showcases artifacts collected and preserved throughout its history of construction and renovation, including Cochin ware artworks that have been designated as national treasures.

== Connection between Cochin ware and Taiwanese temples ==
Originating during the Jiaqing and Daoguang reigns of the Qing Dynasty, craftsmen from coastal regions of mainland China—skilled in clay sculpture and architectural decoration—came to Taiwan, either to escape unrest or in search of a better life. During this period, cochin ware flourished in Taiwan. As early settlers established temples in various regions to seek spiritual comfort, cochin ware craftsmanship became integrated into temple architecture. This led to the emergence of numerous cochin ware artisans and their distinctive works.

Cochin ware is often used as decorative reliefs on temple rooftops and walls. The themes commonly depicted in temple cochin ware include historical figures and deities. Some pieces incorporate homophonic symbolism to convey auspicious meanings, while others portray moral or inspirational stories.

== Origin ==
Syuejia Tzu Chi Temple was originally established in the 40th year of the Kangxi reign during the Qing Dynasty (1701). In 1860, during the 10th year of the Xianfeng reign, local gentry in Syuejia proposed a major reconstruction of the temple. Funds were raised collectively, and the renowned cochin ware artisan Ye Wang (real name Ye Linzhi) was commissioned to create decorative works for the temple's walls and rooftops. The temple underwent further renovations in 1965, followed by two additional restorations under the name of heritage preservation.

As a result, Tzu Chi Temple has preserved many valuable cultural artifacts. Among them are Ye Wang's cochin ware pieces, He Jinlong's cut-and-paste ceramic works, Pan Lishui's door guardian paintings, the "Tzu Chi Temple Commemorative Stele" from 1744 (9th year of the Qianlong reign), the temple's history stele from 1929 (Showa 4), as well as a number of plaques and couplets dating from the Xianfeng, Tongzhi, and Guangxu reign of the Qing Dynasty. Ye Wang's cochin ware works alone number over 200 pieces.

However, on two consecutive nights beginning December 2, 1980, a total of 56 pieces of cochin ware were inexplicably stolen from Tzu Chi Temple. To prevent further theft, the temple removed all of the original works by Ye Wang and placed them into secure storage. Master Lin Guangyi from Chiayi was then commissioned to recreate the stolen pieces based on existing photographs and drawings, and the replicas were installed in the original display locations once occupied by Ye Wang's works.

In order to better preserve the temple's valuable artifacts, Tzu Chi Temple decided in 1981 to construct a cultural building on the dragon side (east side) of the temple complex. This space was intended not only to safeguard the relics, but also to make them accessible for public viewing by worshippers and visitors. Completed and inaugurated in 1983, the building was named the "Tzu Chi Cultural Building". Its second floor, named the Xingde Hall, was dedicated to the exhibition of Ye Wang's cochin ware works. In 2005, the building was renovated and renamed the Ye Wang cochin ware cultural museum, with its exhibition space expanded to the third floor. This museum now displays 103 out of the 249 pieces of cochin ware that have been designated as registered historical artifacts by Tainan County.

The museum not only houses a collection of exquisite cochin ware art but also introduces visitors to the traditional production process of cochin ware and the life and legacy of Ye Wang.

== Recovered artifacts ==
Despite the temple's extensive efforts and generous rewards offered in hopes of recovering the stolen cochin ware, the large number of missing artifacts remained untraceable. It was not until 2003 that some of the stolen pieces unexpectedly appeared at an international art auction. Upon learning of this, the Aurora Cultural and Educational Foundation took action to acquire these precious artifacts from overseas. The recovered cochin ware was then fully and unconditionally donated back to Tzu Chi Temple, adding to the cultural building's collection and enriching the story of the temple's preserved heritage.

== Significance assessment and restoration of artifacts ==
Syuejia Tzu Chi Temple is a temple with a history of over 300 years, and its long-standing heritage has been well preserved thanks to the dedicated efforts of local residents. As a result, the temple retains hundreds of historically significant artifacts, including cochin ware by Master Ye Wang from the Xianfeng reign of the Qing dynasty, cut-and-paste ceramics by He Jinlong from the Shōwa era during Japanese rule, door god paintings by Pan Lishui after World War II, and woodcarvings by artisans such as Su Shuichin and Huang Liang from Tongshan. Among these precious artifacts, the cochin ware pieces by Ye Wang are particularly invaluable—not only because cochin ware is a highly artistic and nearly lost craft, but also because six of Ye Wang's works housed at the temple, forming three pairs—Bestowal of Rank and Emolument; the two panels making up Peace Across the Realm; and The Fat and Skinny Arhats—have been designated as national treasures by the Ministry of Culture.

Although many of Ye Wang's cochin ware pieces have been designated as national treasures, these cultural artifacts suffered from salt damage due to a lack of proper protection in the early days. To address this, the central government provided funding for their restoration, ensuring the long-term preservation of these national treasures housed in the museum.

== Gallery ==
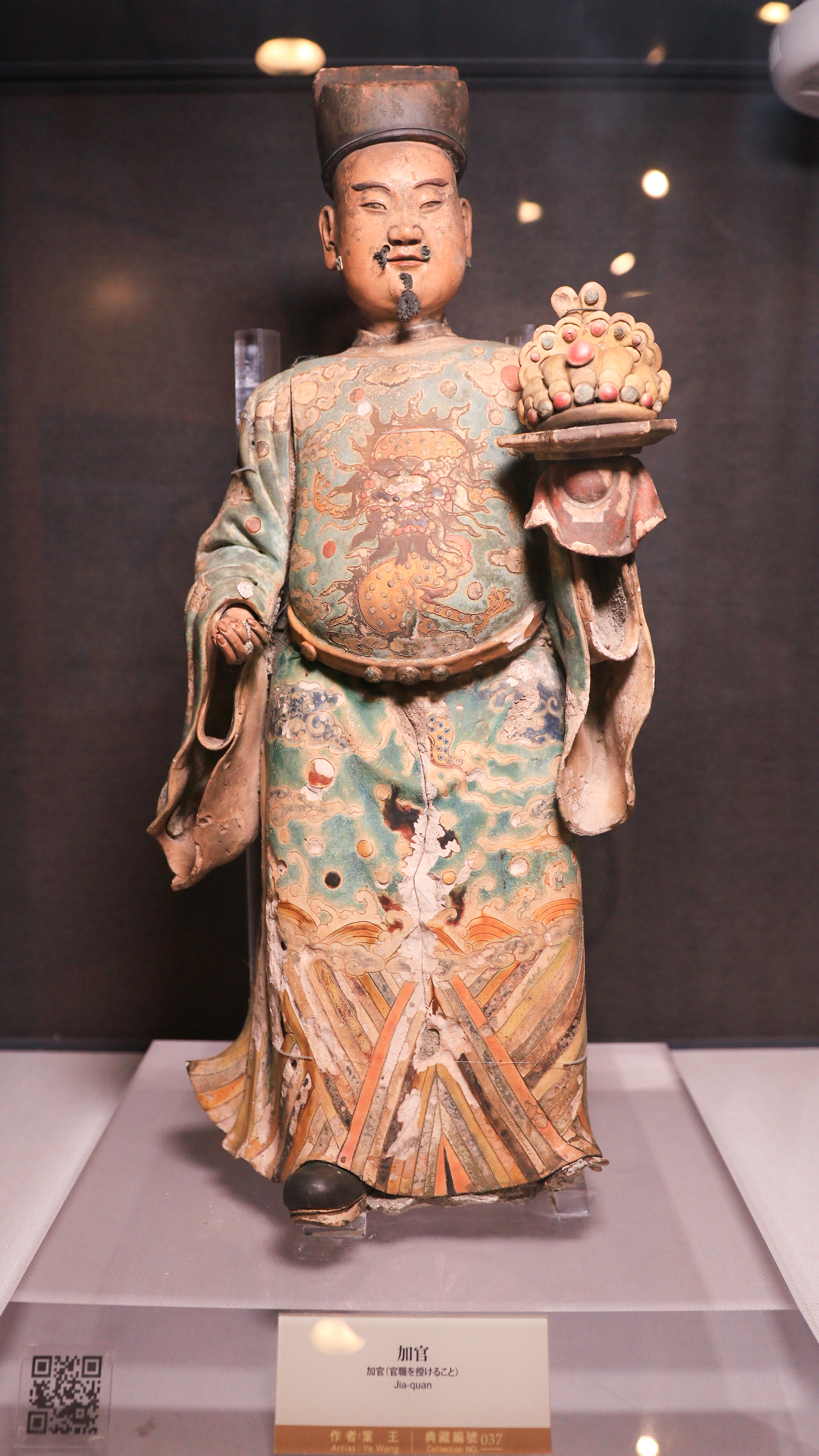
Bestowal of Rank

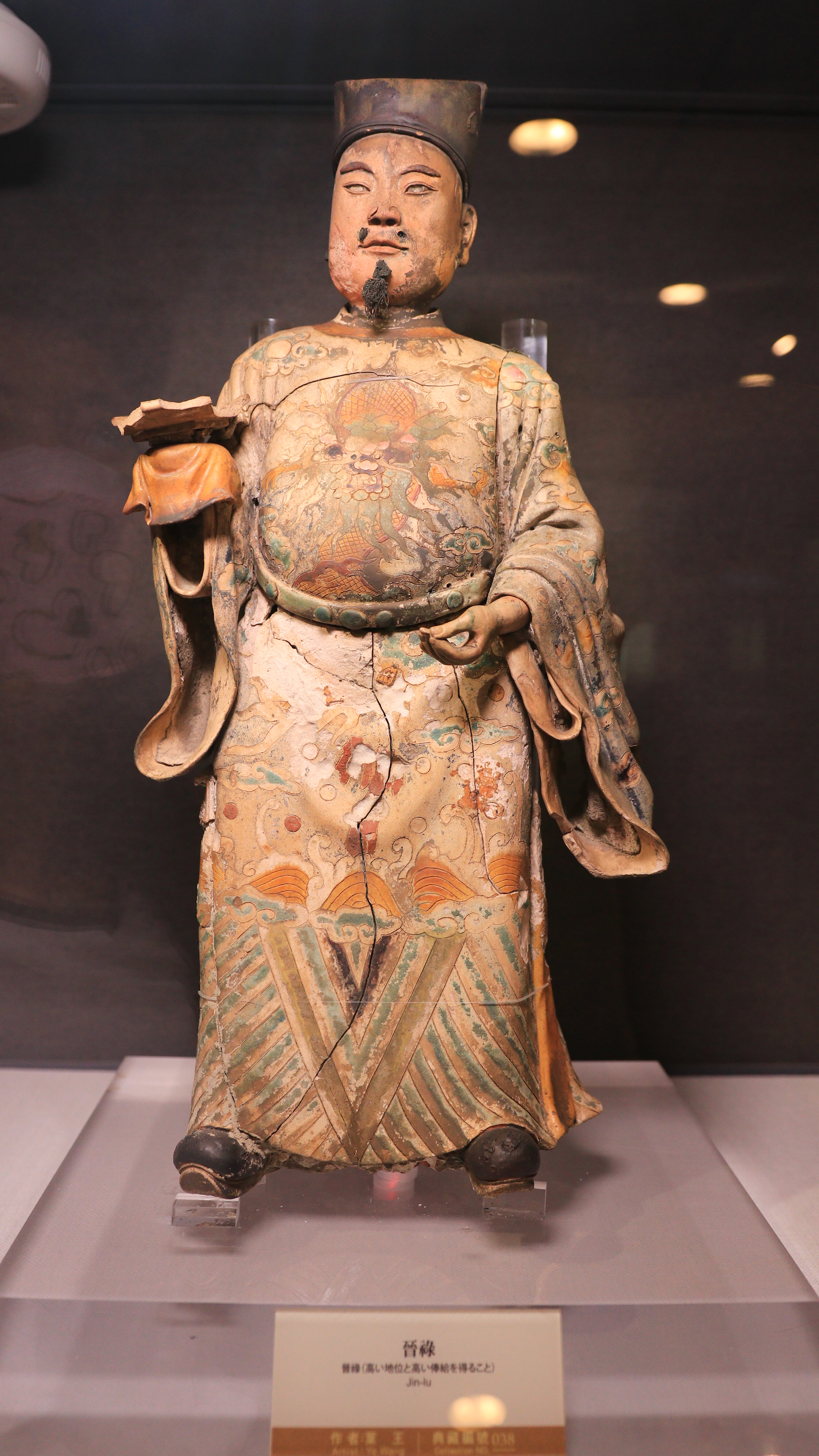
Emolument

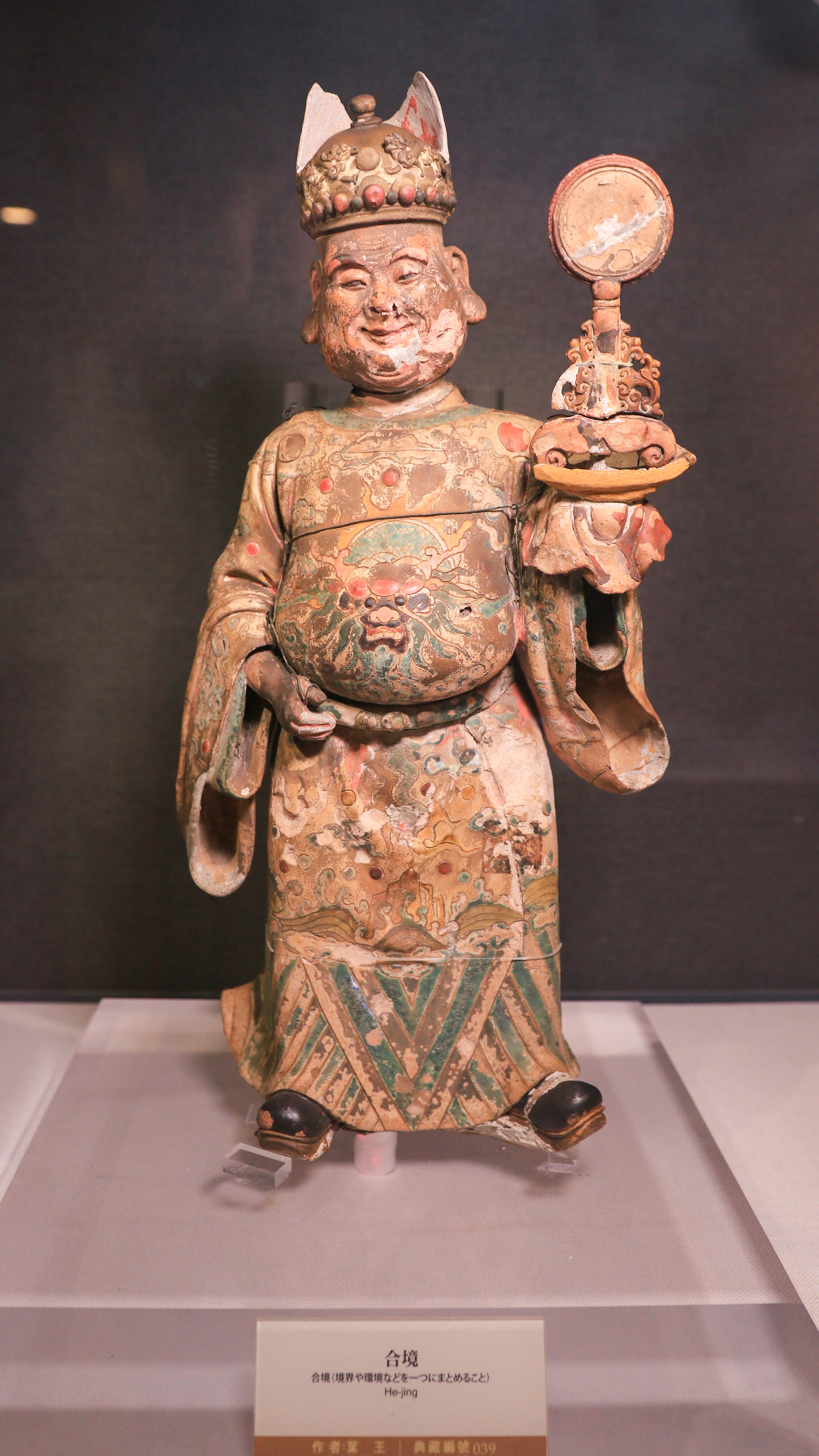
Peace Across the Realm

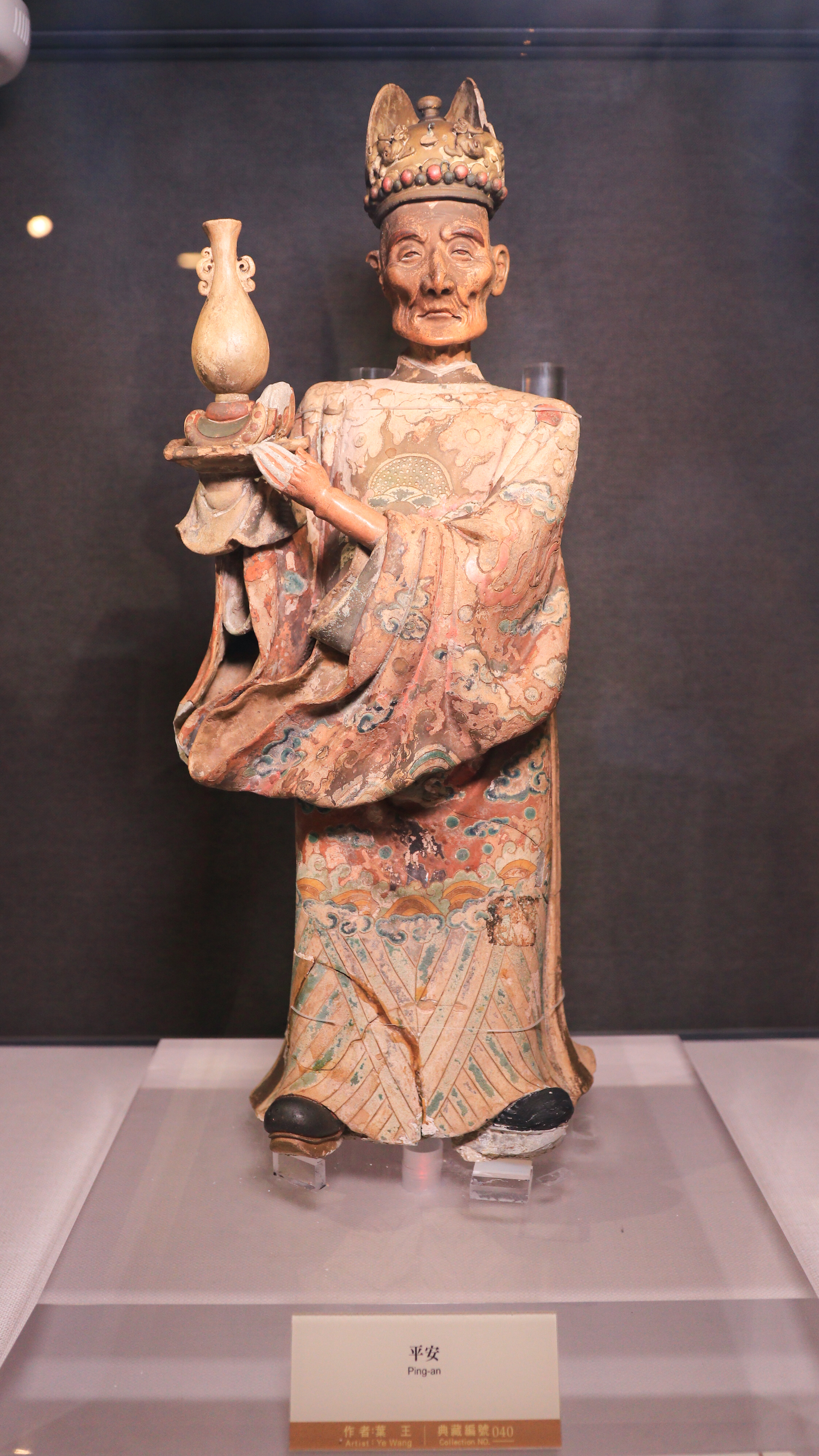
Peace Across the Realm

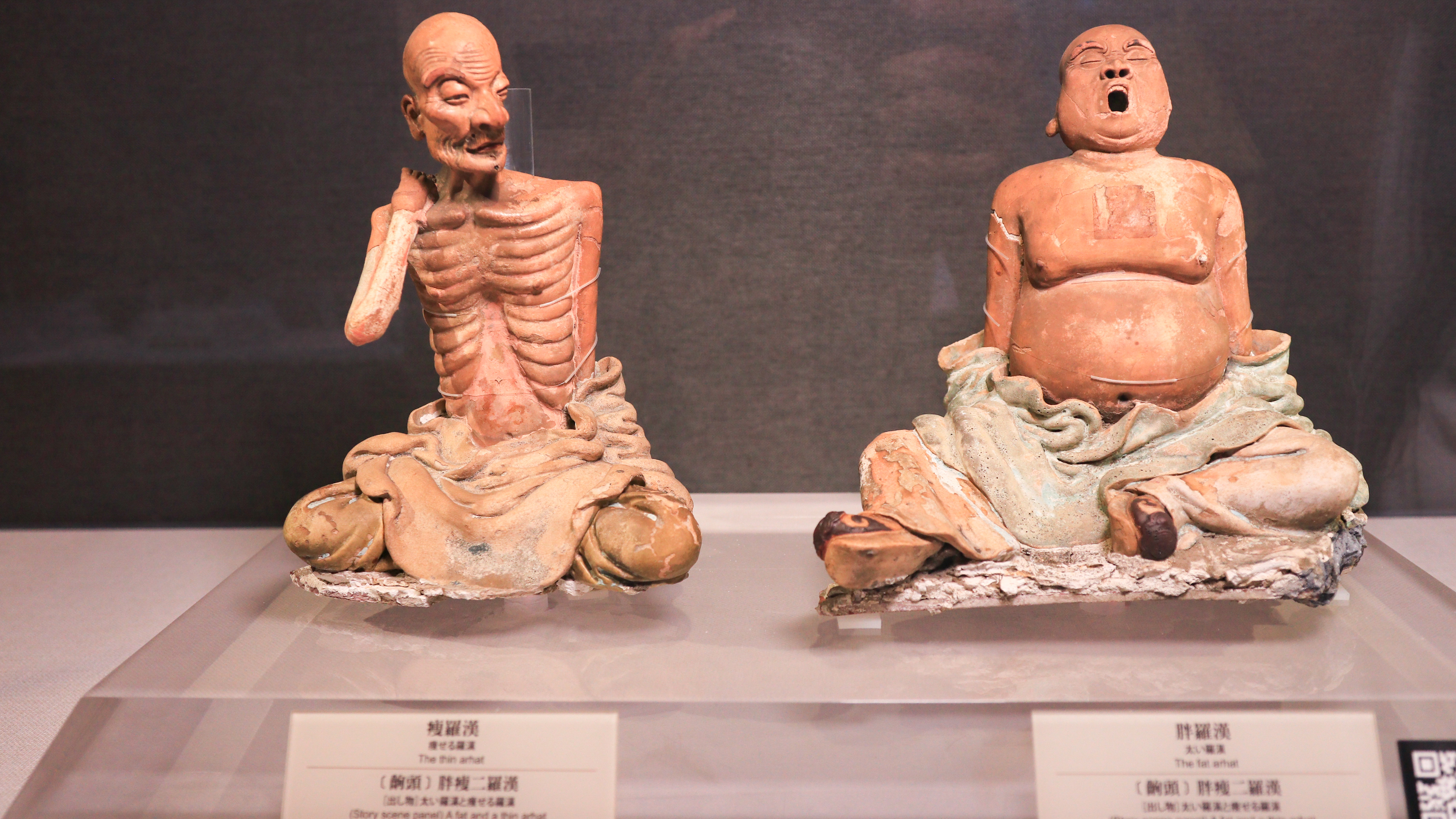
The Fat and Skinny Arhats

== See also ==
- Taiwanese art
